= Dannemora, New Zealand =

Dannemora
- Suburb
- Interactive map of Dannemora
- Coordinates: 36.928°S 174.922°E
- Country: New Zealand
- City: Auckland
- Local authority: Auckland Council
- Electoral ward: Howick ward
- Local board: Howick Local Board

Area
  - Land: 171 ha (420 acres)

Population (June 2025)
  - Total: 4,400
  - Density: 2,600/km^{2} (6,700/sq mi)

Northpark	Northpark	Shamrock Park
Botany	Dannemora
East Tāmaki	East Tāmaki Heights	Whitford

Dannemora is a suburb in Auckland, New Zealand. It is located in the east of the city, close to Pakuranga and Botany Downs, and in the Howick ward and local board area of Auckland Council.

== Geography ==
Dannemora is an ill-defined area of East Auckland near Chapel Road and Kilkenny Drive, south of Shamrock Park. The area is close to the suburbs of Botany, East Tāmaki Heights and Flat Bush. Areas of Flat Bush such as Topland Drive are also known as Dannemora. The highest point in the area is Puke-i-Āki-Rangi, a 142-metre hill also known as Point View.

== History ==
=== Early history ===
The Dannemora area is part of the rohe of Ngāi Tai ki Tāmaki, who descend from the crew of the Tainui migratory waka, who visited the area around the year 1300. Puke-i-Āki-Rangi was a defended Ngāi Tai pā site. The name literally means "The Hill That Way Propelled Skyward". During the Musket Wars in the 1820s, Ngāi Tai Ki Tāmaki sought temporary refuge in the Waikato.

In 1836, English missionary William Thomas Fairburn brokered a land sale between Tāmaki Māori chiefs covering the majority of modern-day South Auckland and East Auckland. The sale was envisioned as a way to end hostilities in the area, but it is unclear what the chiefs understood or consented to. Māori continued to live in the area, unchanged by this sale. In 1854 when Fairburn's purchase was investigated by the New Zealand Land Commission, a Ngāi Tai reserve was created around the Wairoa River and Umupuia areas, and as a part of the agreement, members of Ngāi Tai agreed to leave their traditional settlements to the west.

In 1847, Howick was established as a defensive outpost for Auckland, by fencibles (retired British Army soldiers) and their families. During the late 19th and 20th centuries, Dannemora was East Tāmaki.

=== Development of the suburb ===
Dannemora is a housing development that was constructed in the 1990s and early 2000s. The name Dannemora was chosen by housing developer Wayne Francis, who named it after his horse stud farm in Christchurch. The name ultimately comes from Dannemora, a mining village in Sweden.

Point View School opened in 1997, when the surrounding area was primarily farmland. In 2001, Willowbank Primary School opened in Dannemora. A strip mall called Chapel Road Village opened in Dannemora in 2004, as the first of five planned neighbourhood commercial centres in the wider Flat Bush area.

== Demographics ==
Dannemora covers 1.71 km^{2} (0.66 sq mi) and had an estimated population of 4,400 as of June 2025, with a population density of 2,573 people per km^{2}.

Historical population
Year	Pop.	±% p.a.
2006	3,909	—
2013	3,945	+0.13%
2018	4,446	+2.42%
2023	4,269	−0.81%

Dannemora had a population of 4,269 in the 2023 New Zealand census, a decrease of 177 people (−4.0%) since the 2018 census, and an increase of 324 people (8.2%) since the 2013 census. There were 2,040 males, 2,223 females and 9 people of other genders in 1,362 dwellings. 2.0% of people identified as LGBTIQ+. The median age was 46.1 years (compared with 38.1 years nationally). There were 639 people (15.0%) aged under 15 years, 723 (16.9%) aged 15 to 29, 1,827 (42.8%) aged 30 to 64, and 1,083 (25.4%) aged 65 or older.

People could identify as more than one ethnicity. The results were 38.9% European (Pākehā); 3.7% Māori; 3.8% Pasifika; 55.1% Asian; 3.0% Middle Eastern, Latin American and African New Zealanders (MELAA); and 2.4% other, which includes people giving their ethnicity as "New Zealander". English was spoken by 89.0%, Māori language by 0.6%, Samoan by 1.0%, and other languages by 47.9%. No language could be spoken by 1.2% (e.g. too young to talk). New Zealand Sign Language was known by 0.1%. The percentage of people born overseas was 55.4, compared with 28.8% nationally.

Religious affiliations were 32.4% Christian, 7.4% Hindu, 2.7% Islam, 0.3% Māori religious beliefs, 3.0% Buddhist, 0.1% New Age, and 3.4% other religions. People who answered that they had no religion were 45.0%, and 5.6% of people did not answer the census question.

Of those at least 15 years old, 1,164 (32.1%) people had a bachelor's or higher degree, 1,392 (38.3%) had a post-high school certificate or diploma, and 1,077 (29.7%) people exclusively held high school qualifications. The median income was $35,800, compared with $41,500 nationally. 525 people (14.5%) earned over $100,000 compared to 12.1% nationally. The employment status of those at least 15 was that 1,548 (42.6%) people were employed full-time, 435 (12.0%) were part-time, and 54 (1.5%) were unemployed.

Individual statistical areas
Name	Area (km^{2})	Population	Density (per km^{2})	Dwellings	Median age	Median income
Dannemora North-Shamrock Park	0.92	2,397	2,605	774	50.1 years	$32,500
Dannemora South	0.78	1,872	2,400	585	42.7 years	$44,000
New Zealand					38.1 years	$41,500

== Education ==
Botany Downs Secondary College is a secondary school (years 9–13) with a roll of 1972. The school opened in 2004.

Point View School is a coeducational contributing primary school (years 1–6) with a roll of 659 as of July 2025. The school opened in 1997. Willowbank School is a contributing primary school (years 1–6) with a roll of 686. It opened in 2001 and was named for the oldest remaining house in the East Tāmaki (now a part of Flat Bush), Willowbank Cottage, which was once used as a school. All of these schools are coeducational. Rolls are as of July 2025.

== Bibliography ==
- La Roche, Alan (2011). Grey's Folly: A History of Howick, Pakuranga, Bucklands-Eastern Beaches, East Tamaki, Whitford, Beachlands and Maraetai. Auckland: Tui Vale Productions. ISBN 978-0-473-18547-3. OCLC 1135039710. Wikidata Q118286377.
