= Barry Curtis =

Barry Curtis may refer to:

- Barry Curtis (actor) (1943–2019), American film and television actor
- Barry Curtis (mayor) (1939–2026), served as mayor (1983–2007) of Manukau City, New Zealand
  - Barry Curtis Park, a park in south Auckland, New Zealand
- Barry Curtis (bishop) (born 1933), retired Anglican bishop in Canada
