= Shamrock Park, New Zealand =

Shamrock Park
- Suburb
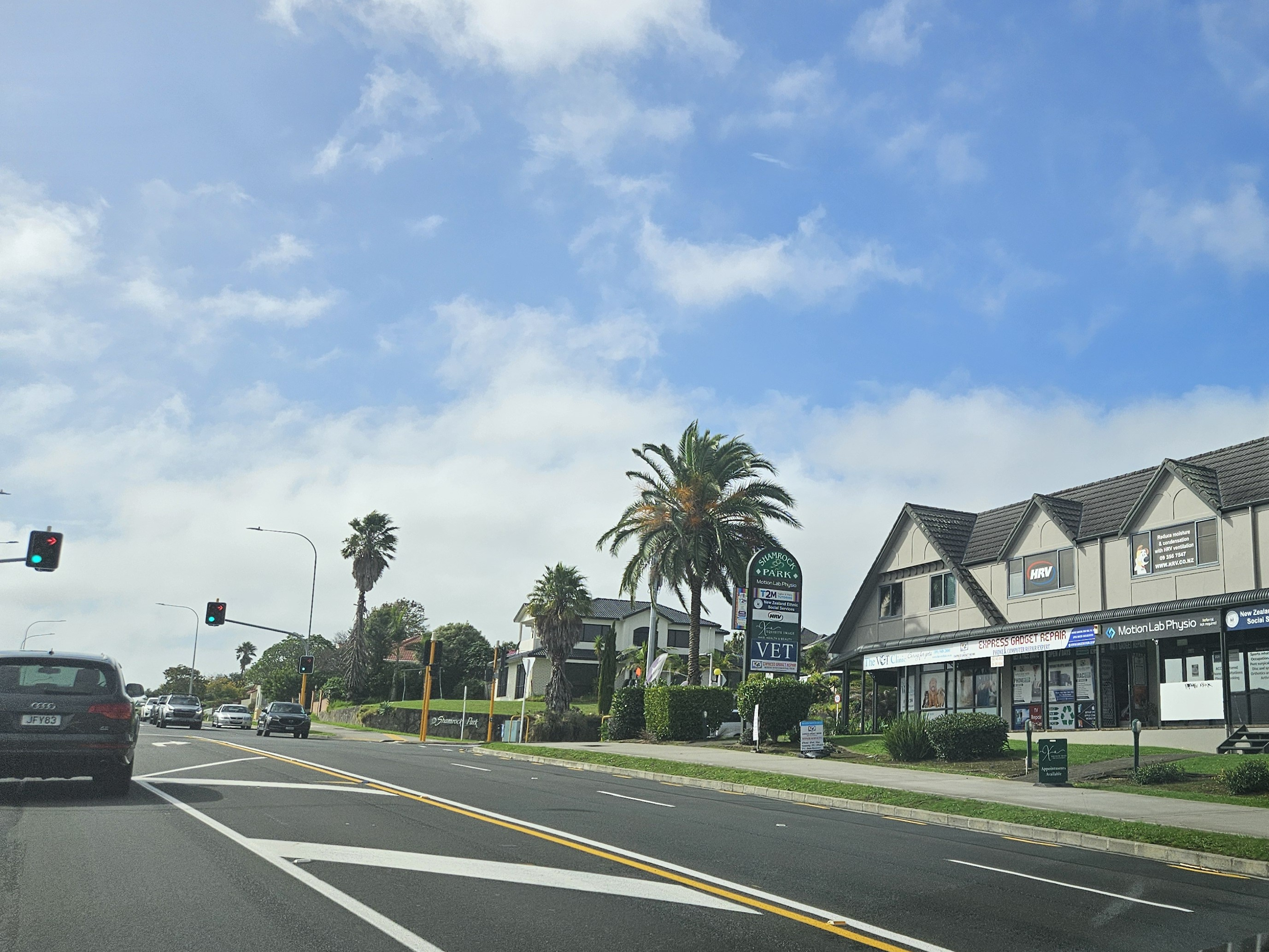
- Chapel Road in Shamrock Park
- Interactive map of Shamrock Park
- Coordinates: 36.923°S 174.928°E
- Country: New Zealand
- City: Auckland
- Local authority: Auckland Council
- Electoral ward: Howick ward
- Local board: Howick Local Board

Area
  - Land: 92 ha (230 acres)

Population (June 2025)
  - Total: 2,420
  - Density: 2,600/km^{2} (6,800/sq mi)

Northpark	Somerville
Northpark	Shamrock Park	Whitford
Dannemora	East Tāmaki Heights

Shamrock Park is an eastern suburb of the city of Auckland, New Zealand.

== Geography ==
Shamrock Park is located in Auckland near Howick, adjacent to the suburbs of Somerville, Northpark and Dannemora. Major roads in the suburb include Whitford Road, Chapel Road and Santa Ana Drive. The area is bounded on the northwest by Chapel Road and Kilkenny Drive, on the northeast by Whitford Road, and on the east by Mangemangeroa Creek.

== History ==
Most of the houses were built in the 1990s. In 1998, the major streets were defined, but the land to the south was rural.

By 2011, Shamrock Park had become the suburb with the largest average house size in New Zealand, with residences having an average floor size of 306 m^{2} (3,290 sq ft). Shamrock Park had become one of the most expensive suburbs in Auckland by the early 2020s, being the area with the highest median house price outside of the Auckland isthmus in 2021.

== Demographics ==
The statistical area of Dannemora North-Shamrock Park, which was called Botany North before the 2023 census, covers 0.92 km^{2} (0.36 sq mi) and had an estimated population of 2,420 as of June 2025, with a population density of 2,630 people per km^{2}.

Historical population
Year	Pop.	±% p.a.
2006	2,049	—
2013	2,100	+0.35%
2018	2,532	+3.81%
2023	2,397	−1.09%

Dannemora North-Shamrock Park had a population of 2,397 in the 2023 New Zealand census, a decrease of 135 people (−5.3%) since the 2018 census, and an increase of 297 people (14.1%) since the 2013 census. There were 1,119 males, 1,272 females and 6 people of other genders in 774 dwellings. 2.1% of people identified as LGBTIQ+. The median age was 50.1 years (compared with 38.1 years nationally). There were 336 people (14.0%) aged under 15 years, 372 (15.5%) aged 15 to 29, 939 (39.2%) aged 30 to 64, and 753 (31.4%) aged 65 or older.

People could identify with more than one ethnicity. The results were 42.8% European (Pākehā); 3.8% Māori; 3.4% Pasifika; 53.6% Asian; 2.4% Middle Eastern, Latin American and African New Zealanders (MELAA); and 1.3% other, which includes people giving their ethnicity as "New Zealander". English was spoken by 88.9%, Māori language by 0.5%, Samoan by 0.8%, and other languages by 46.6%. No language could be spoken by 0.9% (e.g., too young to talk). New Zealand Sign Language was known by 0.1%. The percentage of people born overseas was 54.2, compared with 28.8% nationally.

Religious affiliations were 34.0% Christian, 7.0% Hindu, 1.6% Islam, 0.4% Māori religious beliefs, 3.1% Buddhist, 0.1% New Age, and 3.0% other religions. People who answered that they had no religion were 45.6%, and 5.4% of people did not answer the census question.

Of those at least 15 years old, 636 (30.9%) people had a bachelor's or higher degree, 795 (38.6%) had a post-high school certificate or diploma, and 636 (30.9%) people exclusively held high school qualifications. The median income was $32,500, compared with $41,500 nationally. 282 people (13.7%) earned over $100,000 compared to 12.1% nationally. The employment status of those at least 15 was that 762 (37.0%) people were employed full-time, 246 (11.9%) were part-time, and 30 (1.5%) were unemployed.

== Education ==
Point View School is a coeducational contributing primary school (years 1–6) with a roll of 659 as of July 2025. The school opened in 1997. ACG Education operates a private preschool in the suburb, called ACG Penguins Early Learning School.

== Amenities ==
Santa Cruz Park is a residential park located on the corner of Santa Cruz Drive and Santa Ana Drive in Shamrock Park.

== Local government ==
Shamrock Park was previously a part of Manukau City. In November 2010, all cities and districts of the Auckland Region were amalgamated into a single body, governed by the Auckland Council. Shamrock Park is a part of the Botany subdivision of the Howick local board area. The residents of Shamrock Park elect members of the Howick Local Board, in addition to the two Howick ward councillors, who sits on the Auckland Council.

== Notable people ==
Brian Tamaki, Hannah Tamaki and other early figures within the Christian fundamentalist organisation Destiny Church purchased properties in the Shamrock Park area in the late 1990s, during the establishment of the church.
