= 1962 New Year Honours (New Zealand) =

Awards list for New Zealand

The 1962 New Year Honours in New Zealand were appointments by Elizabeth II on the advice of the New Zealand government to various orders and honours, rewarding and highlighting good works by New Zealanders. The awards celebrated the passing of 1961 and the beginning of 1962, and were announced on 1 January 1962.

The recipients of honours are displayed here as they were styled before their new honour.

== Knight Bachelor ==
- Thomas Duncan MacGregor Stout CBE DSO ED FRCS MS FRCS – of Wellington. For services to medicine and to education.
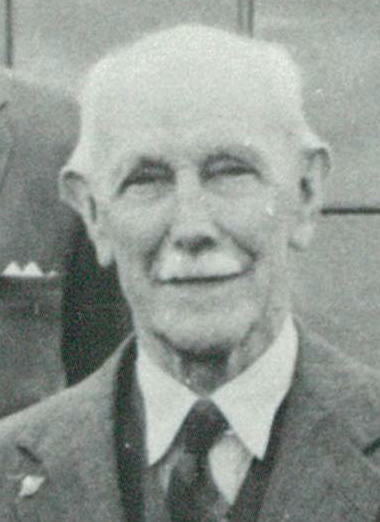
Sir Duncan Stout

== Order of the Bath ==
=== Companion (CB) ===
Military division

- Major-General Leonard Whitmore Thornton CBE – Generals' List, New Zealand Regular Force.
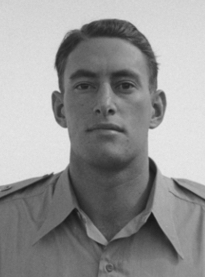
Leonard Thornton

== Order of Saint Michael and Saint George ==
=== Companion (CMG) ===
- Edwin Lloydd Greensmith – secretary to the Treasury.
- Alexander Paterson O'Shea – general secretary of Federated Farmers of New Zealand.
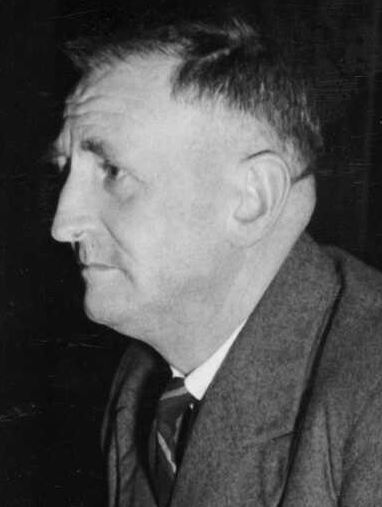
Alex O'Shea

== Order of the British Empire ==
=== Knight Commander (KBE) ===
Civil division

- Alexander McKenzie – of Auckland. For political services.

=== Commander (CBE) ===
Civil division

- Charles Croft Marsack – chief judge of Western Samoa.
- David Gordon Bruce Morison MC – formerly chief judge of the Māori Land Court.
- Carleton Hunter Perkins – of Christchurch. For services to accountancy and education.
- Alfred Hamish Reed MBE – of Dunedin; a publisher and writer of New Zealand historical works.
- Donald Frederick Clifford Saxton – of New Plymouth. For services to journalism.
- John Bird Wright. For services to the New Zealand Island Territories and to Western Samoa.

Military division

- Rear-Admiral Peter Phipps DSC VRD – Royal New Zealand Navy.
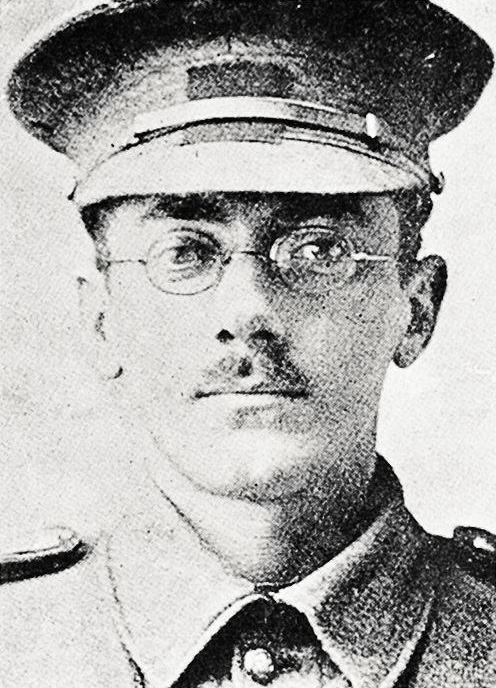
Charles Marsack

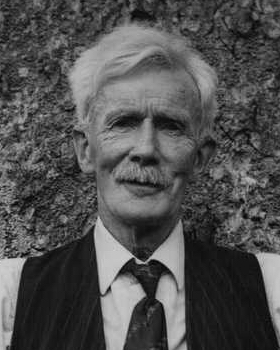
A. H. Reed

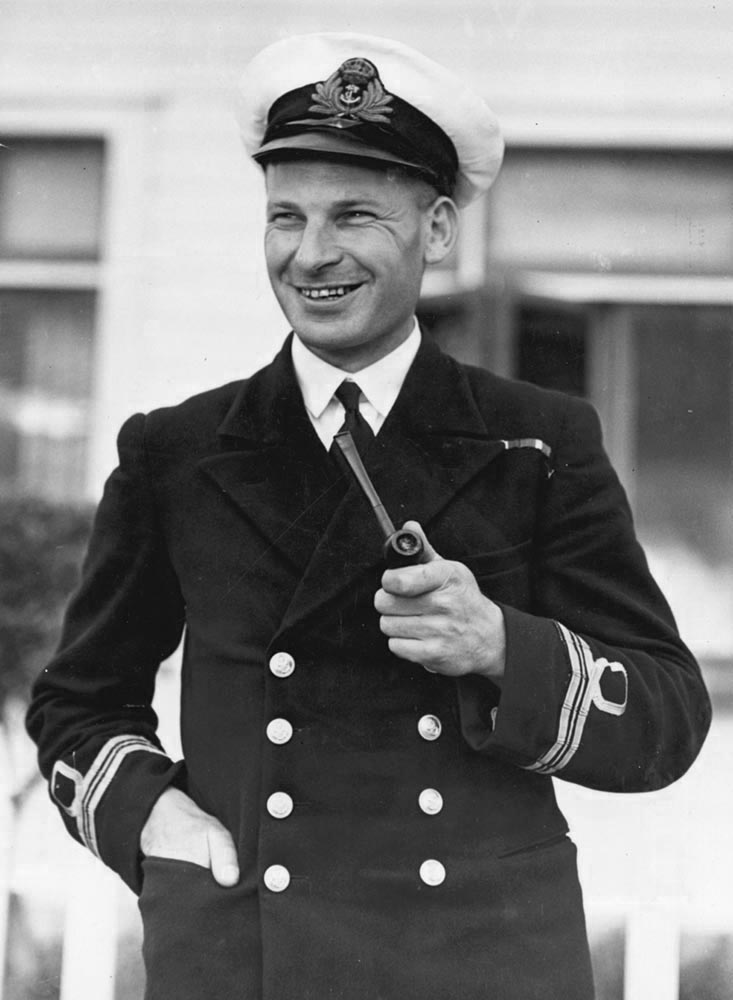
Peter Phipps

=== Officer (OBE) ===
Civil division

- Gustav Frederick Dertag Betham. For services to Western Samoa.
- The Reverend Alan Anderson Brash – general secretary of the National Council of Churches in New Zealand.
- Leicester Mitchell Cook – financial secretary, Western Samoa, 1938–1961.
- Edgar Oliver Faber JP – of Auckland. For services to the community in local-body and social welfare work.
- Harold Gow. For community services in Western Samoa.
- David Harris – of Invercargill. For local government and trade union services.
- William Henry Kelly – general manager of the Western Samoan Trust Estates Corporation for many years.
- Hugh Drummond Lambie – of Auckland. For services to the dairy industry and to local government.
- Arthur Leslie Lydiard – of Auckland. For services to sport.
- Edward Alan Millward – mayor of Wanganui and chairman of the Wanganui Harbour Board.
- Reupena Pahau Milner – of Gisborne. For services to the Māori people.
- Eugene Friedrich Paul. For services to Western Samoa.
- David Clarence Pryor – of Palmerston North. For services to teaching and local-government affairs.
- Edwin Ian Robertson – director of the Geophysics Division of the Department of Scientific and Industrial Research.
- Wilson James Whineray. For services to sport, especially to rugby football.
- Ronald Hugh White – of Hastings. For services to local government.

Military division

- Commander Owen Rowland James Skyrme – Royal New Zealand Navy.
- Lieutenant-Colonel (temporary) Thomas Frederick Llewellyn Ward ED – Royal New Zealand Infantry Corps (Territorial Force).
- Group Captain Edward George King – Royal New Zealand Air Force.
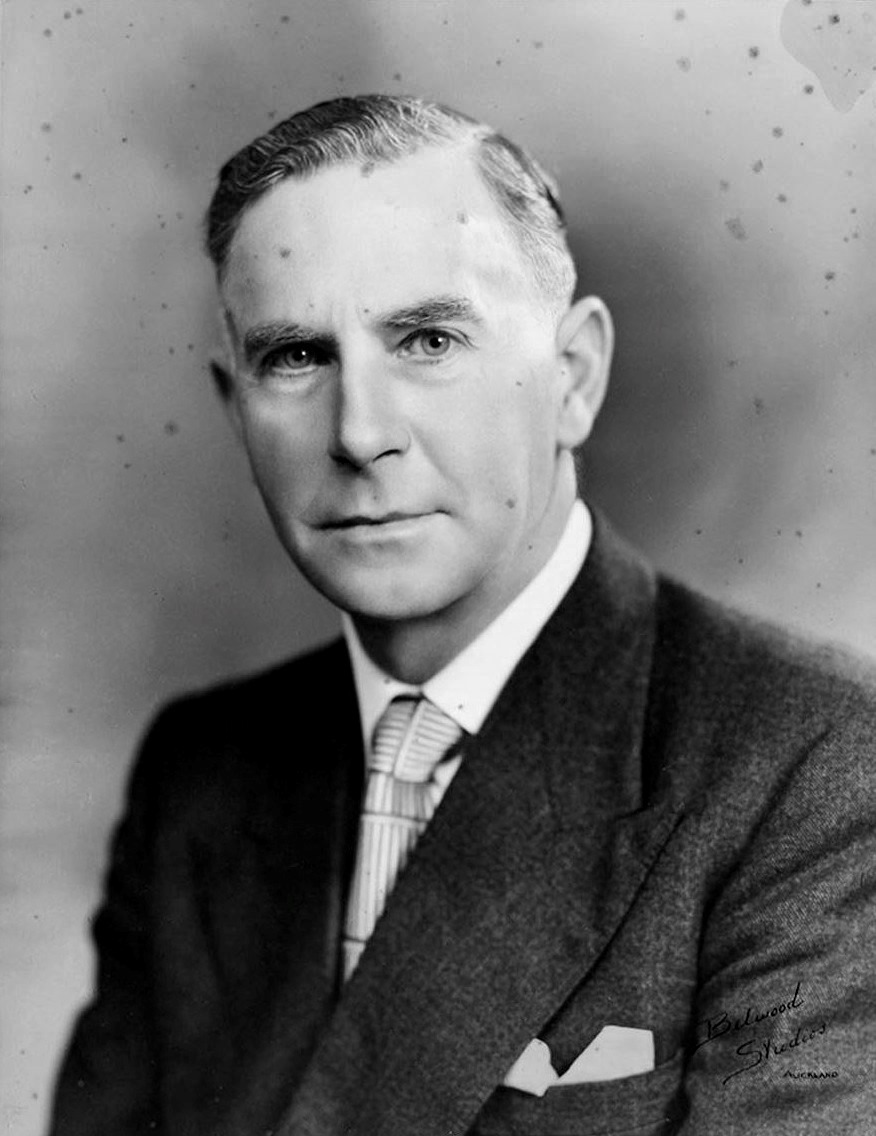
Hugh Lambie

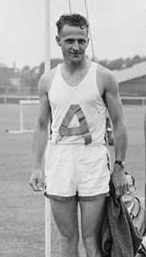
Arthur Lydiard

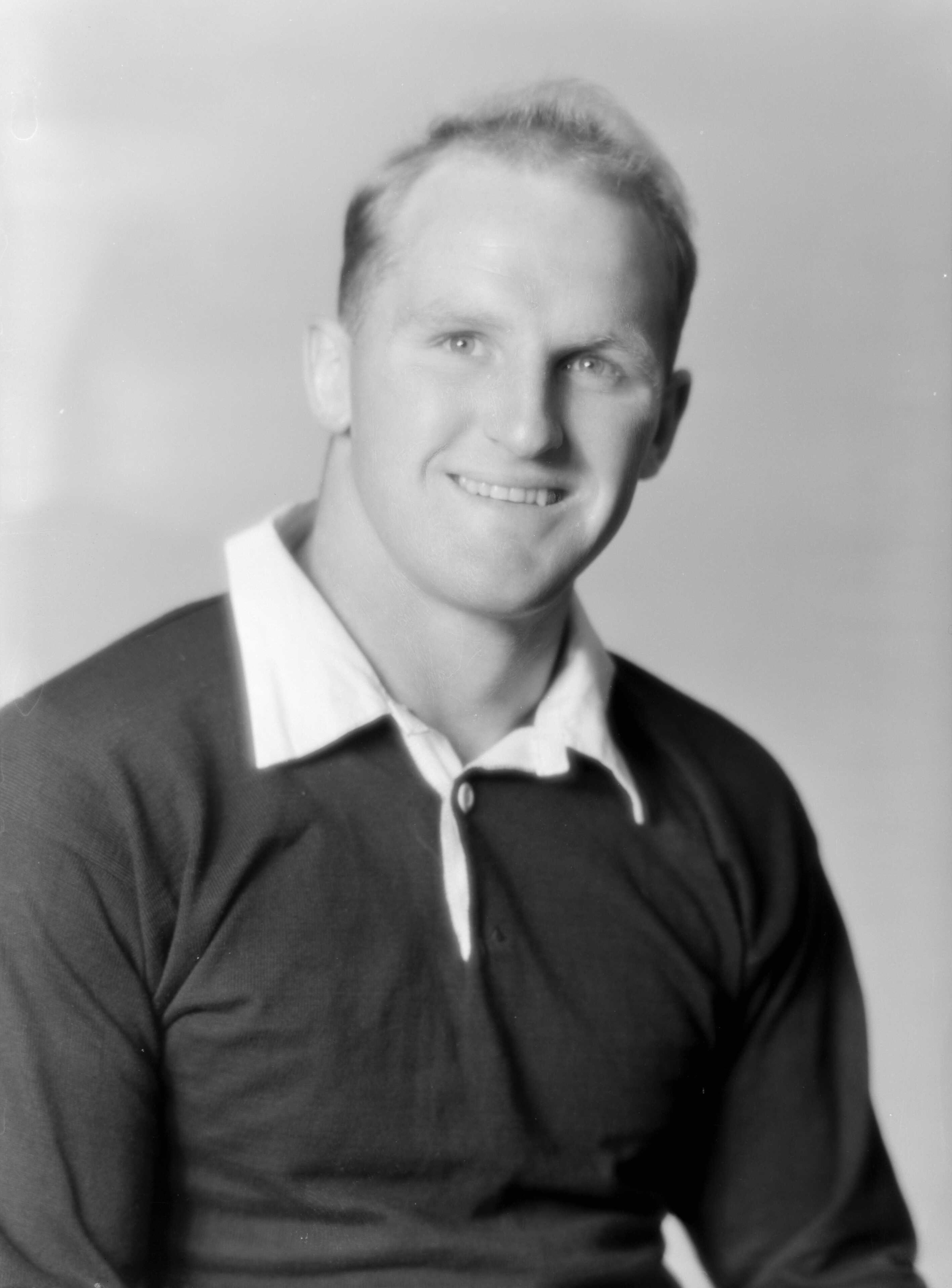
Wilson Whineray

=== Member (MBE) ===
Civil division

- Frederick William Baillee JP – mayor of Greymouth.
- Andrew Cameron Booth – president of the New Zealand Club in Sydney, New South Wales, Australia.
- Ian Donald Arthur Cameron JP. For services to local-body and sporting affairs.
- Matthew Alexander Carson JP – general secretary of the New Zealand Returned Services Association.
- Christine Lumsden Cumming – of Invercargill. For services to the community, especially in connection with the youth movement in Southland.
- Arthur John Denz JP. For services to the community, especially as a member of the Hamilton City Council.
- Russell Andrew Douglas JP – of Dunedin. For services to the community, especially to elderly people.
- Francis James Foster – of Manawatu. For services to local-body administration.
- Hilda Blair Gardiner – of Oamaru. For social welfare services.
- Edith Gourley – of Wellington. For community services.
- Tapeni Ioelu. For services to education in Western Samoa.
- Ernest Albert Frederick Jenner – of Christchurch. For services to music.
- Thomas Turner Laban – collector of customs, Western Samoa.
- Muipu Maiava – senior inspector, Education Department, Western Samoa.
- Taula Anesi Malaefou – assistant medical superintendent, Apia Public Hospital, Western Samoa.
- James Embury May – assistant director of the New Zealand Foundation for the Blind.
- Charles William Bloomfield Michie JP, of Kaitaia. For services to farming and local-body affairs.
- David Sceptre Mitchell JP – mayor of Tauranga.
- Margaret Waiata Nicholls – of Hamilton. For social-welfare services to the Māori people in the Auckland District.
- Irvine James Quigley – of Gisborne. For services to local government and community affairs.
- Hannah Grayson Rogers – brigadier, Salvation Army, Auckland.
- Alan Wilfred Ruskell – of Pahiatua. For services to farming and community affairs.
- Edmond Stehlin – private secretary to the prime minister of Western Samoa.
- Antonie Alison Lovoni Woods – matron of the Wairau Hospital, Blenheim.

Military division

- Engineer Lieutenant-Commander George Mitchell – Royal New Zealand Navy.
- Major Clarence Keith Fleming ED – The Corps of Royal New Zealand Electrical and Mechanical Engineers (Regular Force).
- Major Gavin McCulloch Gray ED – Royal New Zealand Infantry Corps (Territorial Force).
- Major Ronald Douglas Patrick Hassett – Royal Regiment of New Zealand Artillery (Regular Force).
- Warrant Officer Second Class Alan Ross – Royal Regiment of New Zealand Artillery (Territorial Force).
- Squadron Leader Harold Bert Hayward – Royal New Zealand Air Force.
- Warrant Officer John MacDonald – Royal New Zealand Air Force.

== British Empire Medal (BEM) ==
Civil division

- Amanono – head houseboy, Government House, Western Samoa.
- Ross Charles Anderson – detective sergeant, Criminal Investigation Branch, New Zealand Police Force.
- Momoi Kuresa – matron's assistant, Apia Public Hospital, Western Samoa.
- Thomas Thomson – detective sergeant, Criminal Investigation Branch, New Zealand Police Force.

Military division

- Chief Engine Room Artificer Richard Arnold Agnew – Royal New Zealand Navy.
- Master at Arms Morris Edwin Bennett – Royal New Zealand Navy.
- Stores Chief Petty Officer Herbert Maurice Douglas Pond – Royal New Zealand Navy.
- Chief Ordnance Artificer John Charles Tyler – Royal New Zealand Navy.
- Staff-Sergeant (temporary) Rodney George Evans – The Corps of Royal New Zealand Electrical and Mechanical Engineers (Territorial Force).
- Sergeant Gaile Lorraine Holland – New Zealand Women's Royal Army Corps (Regular Force).
- Staff-Sergeant Robert James Plummer – Royal New Zealand Army Ordnance Corps (Regular Force).
- Sergeant Michael Shaun Ryan – The New Zealand Regiment (Regular Force).
- Flight Sergeant John Hope Brown – Royal New Zealand Air Force.
- Flight Sergeant James Eric Rasmusen – Royal New Zealand Air Force.

== Air Force Cross (AFC) ==
- Squadron Leader Thomas Joseph Danaher – Royal New Zealand Air Force.

== Royal Red Cross ==
=== Associate (ARRC) ===
- Matron (temporary) Joan Gwendoline Woodruff Dickson – Royal New Zealand Nursing Corps (Territorial Force).

== Queen's Police Medal (QPM) ==
- Patrick Kearney – chief superintendent, New Zealand Police Force.

== Queen's Fire Services Medal (QFSM) ==
- Nathaniel Gordon Buick – chief fire officer, Palmerston North Fire Brigade.
- Norman Leonard Brown – chief fire officer, Pukekohe Fire Brigade.

== Queen's Commendation for Valuable Service in the Air ==
- Flight Lieutenant John Maxted Terry – Royal New Zealand Air Force.
- Flight Lieutenant William Henry Willis – Royal New Zealand Air Force.
- Flight Sergeant James Waiau Karauria – Royal New Zealand Air Force.
