= Mission Heights =

- Suburb
- Interactive map of Mission Heights
- Coordinates: 36.961700°S 174.932300°E
- Country: New Zealand
- City: Auckland
- Local authority: Auckland Council
- Electoral ward: Howick ward
- Local board: Howick Local Board

Area
  - Land: 194 ha (480 acres)

Population (June 2025)
  - Total: 8,040
  - Density: 4,140/km^{2} (10,700/sq mi)

East Tāmaki Heights
Flat Bush	Mission Heights
Flat Bush	Flat Bush	Regis Park

Mission Heights is an eastern suburb of Auckland, New Zealand, comprising Mission Heights North and Mission Heights South. It is located in the wider suburb of Flat Bush.

== Demographics ==
Mission Heights covers 1.94 km^{2} (0.75 sq mi) and had an estimated population of 8,040 as of June 2025, with a population density of 4,144 people per km^{2}.

Historical population
Year	Pop.	±% p.a.
2006	150	—
2013	4,959	+64.83%
2018	6,174	+4.48%
2023	7,038	+2.65%

Mission Heights had a population of 7,038 in the 2023 New Zealand census, an increase of 864 people (14.0%) since the 2018 census, and an increase of 2,079 people (41.9%) since the 2013 census. There were 3,558 males, 3,477 females and 9 people of other genders in 1,764 dwellings. 2.0% of people identified as LGBTIQ+. There were 1,524 people (21.7%) aged under 15 years, 1,449 (20.6%) aged 15 to 29, 3,420 (48.6%) aged 30 to 64, and 654 (9.3%) aged 65 or older.

People could identify as more than one ethnicity. The results were 15.2% European (Pākehā); 4.6% Māori; 10.2% Pasifika; 73.1% Asian; 3.3% Middle Eastern, Latin American and African New Zealanders (MELAA); and 3.1% other, which includes people giving their ethnicity as "New Zealander". English was spoken by 85.7%, Māori language by 0.9%, Samoan by 3.1%, and other languages by 53.7%. No language could be spoken by 2.3% (e.g. too young to talk). New Zealand Sign Language was known by 0.2%. The percentage of people born overseas was 62.7, compared with 28.8% nationally.

Religious affiliations were 26.6% Christian, 14.5% Hindu, 4.9% Islam, 0.1% Māori religious beliefs, 4.7% Buddhist, 0.1% Jewish, and 9.2% other religions. People who answered that they had no religion were 34.7%, and 5.3% of people did not answer the census question.

Of those at least 15 years old, 1,833 (33.2%) people had a bachelor's or higher degree, 1,956 (35.5%) had a post-high school certificate or diploma, and 1,728 (31.3%) people exclusively held high school qualifications. 744 people (13.5%) earned over $100,000 compared to 12.1% nationally. The employment status of those at least 15 was that 3,075 (55.8%) people were employed full-time, 648 (11.8%) were part-time, and 144 (2.6%) were unemployed.

Individual statistical areas
Name	Area (km^{2})	Population	Density (per km^{2})	Dwellings	Median age	Median income
Mission Heights North	1.07	3,336	3,118	885	36.8 years	$44,500
Mission Heights South	0.87	3,702	4,255	879	33.5 years	$47,300
New Zealand					38.1 years	$41,500

== Education ==
Mission Heights Junior College is a junior secondary school (years 7–10) located in the suburb. The school has a decile of 7 and a roll of 871 as of 2022. Mission Heights School is a contributing primary school (years 1–6) with 703 students. The two schools are adjacent. Both schools opened in 2009.
