= Hugh Lambie (mayor) =

New Zealand politician

Hugh Lambie OBE JP
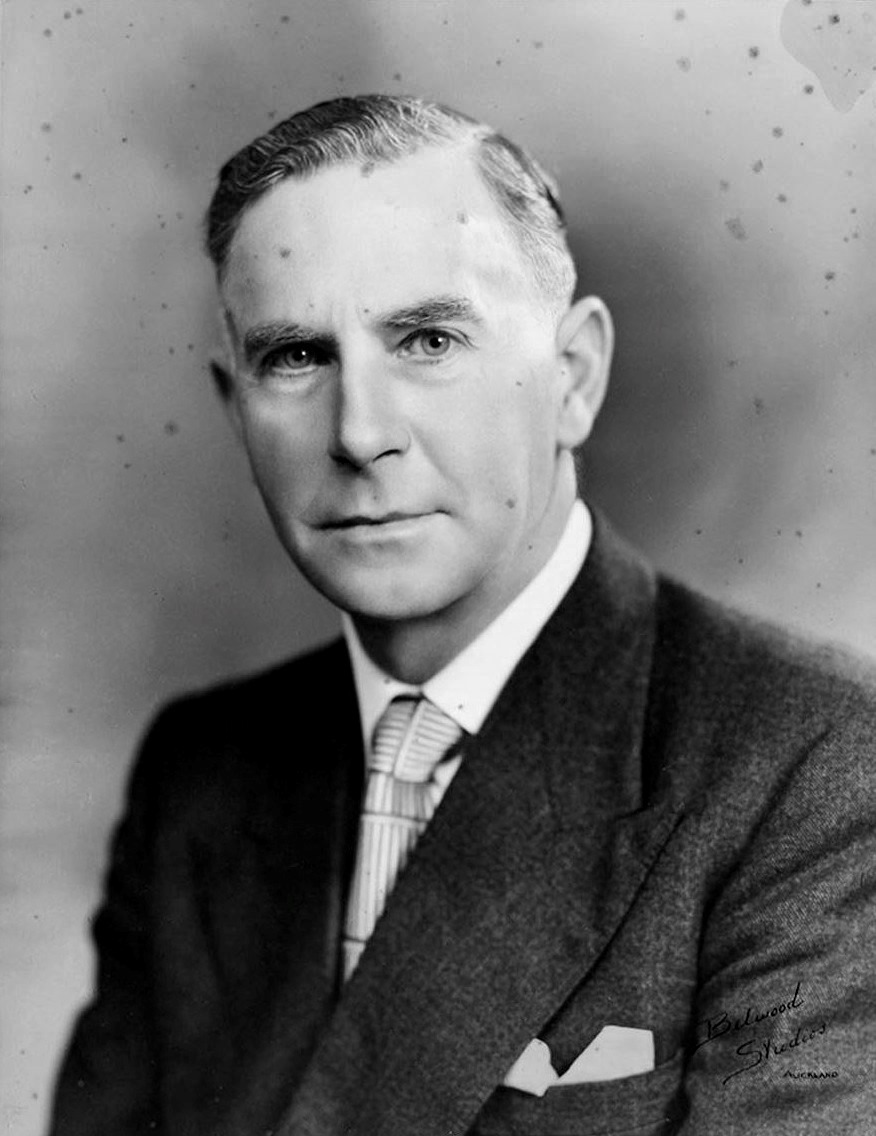

2nd Chair of the Auckland Regional Authority
- In office 9 October 1965 – 12 October 1968
- Deputy: Leo Manning
- Preceded by: Dove-Myer Robinson
- Succeeded by: Tom Pearce

1st Mayor of Manukau City
- In office 3 September 1965 – 12 October 1968
- Deputy: Chris Mountfort
- Preceded by: Neil MacDougall (Note: As chairman of Manukau County)
- Succeeded by: Lloyd Elsmore

Personal details
- Born: 25 December 1904 Taranaki, New Zealand
- Died: 27 August 1980 (aged 75) Auckland, New Zealand
- Spouse: Ethel May Hardley
- Children: 1
- Profession: Farmer

Hugh Drummond Lambie OBE JP (25 December 1904 – 27 August 1980) was a New Zealand politician and farmer. He is known as the father of Manukau City and having a record of generosity, courtesy, integrity and vision.

== Biography ==
=== Early life ===
Lambie was born in Taranaki in 1904. He farmed on his family property on the outskirts of Eltham and in 1932 he married Ethel May Hardley. In 1939 he moved to Māngere and soon after was appointed to the New Zealand Milk Board and was also chairman of the Auckland Milk Treatment Corporation.

He was closely associated with the Presbyterian church. He was an elder for fifty years and was also a member of the Masonic Lodge.

=== Political career ===
In 1947 he was first elected to the Manukau County Council and was its chairman from 1956 to 1965. As chairman he strongly advocated for regional co-operation across Auckland as well as local body amalgamation. In the 1962 New Year Honours, he was appointed an Officer of the Order of the British Empire, for services to the dairy industry and to local government. He was instrumental in the amalgamation of Manukau County and Manurewa Borough in September 1965 to become Manukau City and was unopposed to become Manukau City's first mayor. As mayor he reserved much vacant land in the new city for future public recreation, foreseeing the areas susceptibility to urban sprawl.

Lambie was also elected a founding member of the Auckland Regional Authority (ARA). He contested the inaugural ARA chairmanship vote against Dove-Myer Robinson, the Mayor of Auckland City, and lost by only eight votes. Following the 1965 local elections he challenged Robinson and was this time elected by his peers as chairman of the ARA, combining this with the mayoralty as well. As chairman he clashed with Auckland mayor Roy McElroy who demanded that the Auckland City Council receive a guarantee that the ARA transport levy be postponed until the ARA's finances were investigated and audited. McElroy went as far to threaten that without such an assurance he would apply to the supreme court for an injunction preventing payments by his council. Lambie called McElroy's bluff, who dropped his injunction threat and eventually paid the levy.

At the 1968 elections Lambie decided not to stand again as mayor in order to concentrate fully on his role as ARA chairman. This plan was thwarted in a shock result, however, when he failed to win the Manukau seat on the ARA. After a three-year gap Lambie was returned to the ARA at the 1971 elections, though by then his time of major influence in Auckland had passed. Lambie's legacy to the ARA was one of "soft regionalism" continued by his successors. During his term Lambie thought it essential for the ARA to have good relations with both central government and the borough councils.

=== Later life and death ===
After retiring from the ARA he devoted much of his time to welfare work. He helped to establish the Māngere community house, sponsored a library at Nga Tapuwae College and was a patron of numerous charitable, cultural and sporting organisations.

He died on 27 August 1980 aged 75. He was survived by his wife, son and two grandchildren.

== Honorific eponym ==
Lambie Drive in Manukau City Centre; Hugh Lambie Village at Camp Adair and an apple tree planted in the grounds of Barnardo's Family Care Centre in Māngere are all named after him.

== Notes ==
Political offices
Preceded by Dove-Myer Robinson	Chair of the Auckland Regional Authority; 1965–1968	Succeeded by Tom Pearce
Preceded by Neil MacDougall	Mayor of Manukau City; 1965–1968	Succeeded by Lloyd Elsmore
