= Tom Pearce (politician) =

New Zealand politician, businessman (1913–1976)

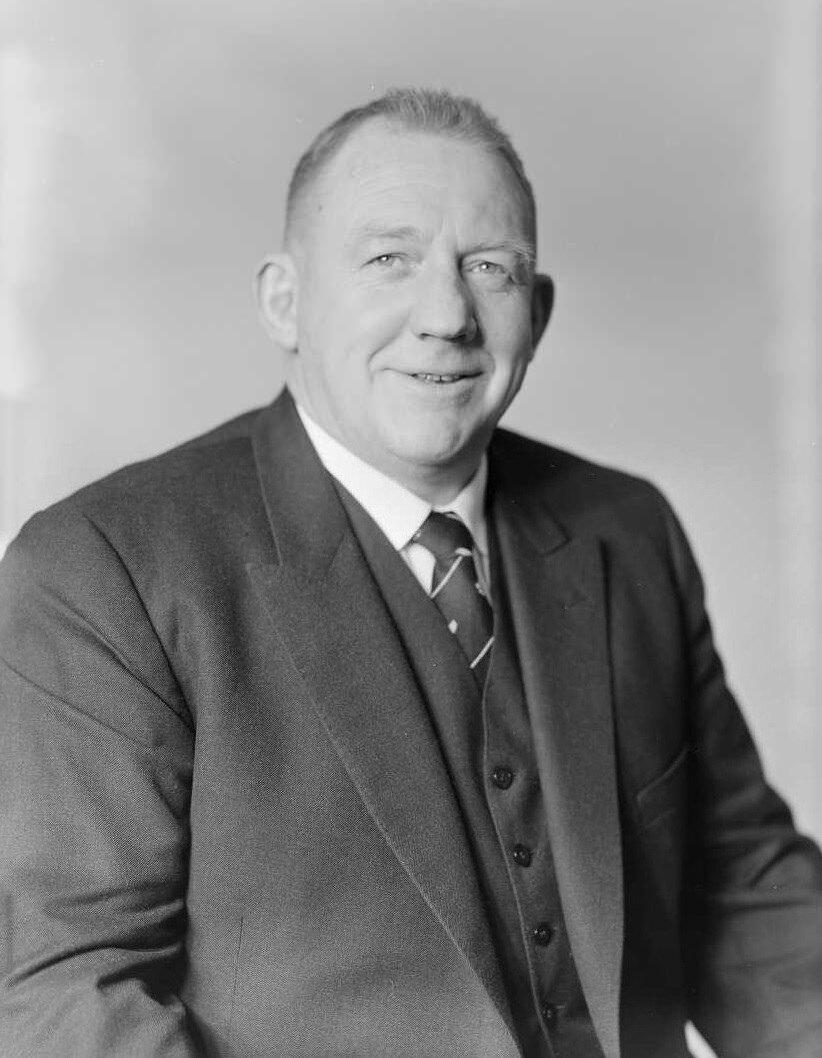
- Pearce circa 1960

3rd Chair of the Auckland Regional Authority
- In office 12 October 1968 – 10 November 1976
- Deputy: Lee Murdoch
- Preceded by: Hugh Lambie
- Succeeded by: Lee Murdoch

Personal details
- Born: 4 June 1913 Auckland, New Zealand
- Died: 10 November 1976 (aged 63) Auckland, New Zealand
- Spouse: Doris Margaret Morgan
- Relations: Sandra Coney (daughter)
- Children: 2
- Education: University of Auckland
- Profession: Sports administrator

Thomas Henry Pearce (4 June 1913 – 10 November 1976) was a New Zealand politician, rugby union player and businessman. He was chairman of the Auckland Regional Authority for 8 years. A controversial figure, he was known for his blunt, often fiery personality speaking forthrightly and not standing on ceremony.

== Biography ==
=== Early life ===
Pearce was born in Auckland in 1913. He was educated at Mount Albert Grammar School before attending University of Auckland. A physically large man, he was an active athlete and enjoyed swimming, rugby and wrestling.

He was also active in surf lifesaving and in 1934 he became a member of the Piha Surf Life Saving Club, remaining a member until 1961. At one time or another he held every office in the club and was made a life member of the club. He cared for the state and condition of Auckland's beaches and was opposed to the proposed sewage dumping scheme (the Browns Island plan) that would have discharged untreated effluent into Waitematā Harbour. He was a member of the Auckland Metropolitan Drainage Board which opposed, and eventually cancelled the plan.

In 1938 he married Doris Margaret Morgan with whom he had two daughters. He was secretary of the Auckland Transport Licensing Authority for seven years. He then founded his own transportation firm of City Haulage Ltd. In 1968 he was made general manager of the New Zealand Co-operative Wool Marketing Association.

=== Rugby career ===
He played rugby competitively and became a representative player for the Manukau club and later for the Grafton club, of which he later become a life member. In 1934 he was first selected to play for Auckland as a prop. He represented Auckland again from 1936 to 1939, in 1942 and from 1945 to 1946. He was also selected to play for the North Island team in the annual Interisland match in 1937 and 1938. His career peaked when he was a reserve for the All Blacks in three test matches against South Africa during the 1937 tour. Some felt he should have been a starting player.

Following his retirement as a player he turned his involvement to administration. He was a selector for the North Island team in 1948 and was later a selector for Auckland from 1951 to 1953. He was chairman of the Auckland Rugby Union from 1955 to 1961 and was its president from 1963 to 1966. As chairman of the Auckland Rugby Union, Pearce had led a delegation to the Auckland City Council in July 1962 and was aghast at the constant bickering between mayor Dove-Myer Robinson and councillor Charlie Passmore during their discussions and took exception to their behaviour. Pearce was also a member of the New Zealand Rugby Union council from 1955 to 1966 and was president of the union from 1965 to 1966.

Pearce was manager of the New Zealand team for three tours; the 1959 British Lions tour, the 1960 tour of South Africa and the 1961 French tour. In 1965 he was signally honoured as a life honorary vice-president of the South African Rugby Board. He staunchly defended retaining sporting contacts with South Africa.

=== Political career ===
In 1962 he stood on the Citizens & Ratepayers ticket for the Auckland City Council and was elected a member. He held a seat on the council for six years before he decided not to stand for re-election in 1968. In 1963 he was disqualified from the council on a technicality, breaching the Local Authorities (Members Contracts) Act according to the Supreme Court, but was re-elected in April that year in the subsequent by-election.

Once elected, Pearce was quick to clash with mayor Robinson, which was ironic given his previous criticism of the behavior of council members. Undoubtedly the major factor of the friction was Robinson's long history as patron and supporter of rugby league, rival to rugby union which Pearce supported. Pearce showed himself as very old fashioned and notably objected to Robinson's plans to hold an official civic reception for The Beatles during their 1964 tour of New Zealand, describing it as pandering to a group of "long hairs".

He was elected a member of the Auckland Regional Authority (ARA) in 1965. He was elected chairman of the ARA (in preference to the deputy chairman Leo Manning) in 1968 and was re-elected chairman in 1971 and 1974. As chairman he persistently opposed Robinson's proposed plans for a rapid transit system in Auckland concerned with the astronomical cost and the potential of rebellion from the many Auckland boroughs which would not benefit from the scheme.

=== Later life and death ===
Pearce died on 10 November 1976, aged 63. He was survived by his wife and two daughters. He was buried at Waikumete Cemetery.

His death necessitated a by-election for the ARA which was won by Jim Anderton. His daughter Sandra would later become a regional councillor from 2001 to 2010.

== Notes ==
Political offices
| Preceded by Hugh Lambie | Chair of the Auckland Regional Authority; 1968–1976 | Succeeded by Lee Murdoch |
