= Flat Bush =

- Suburb
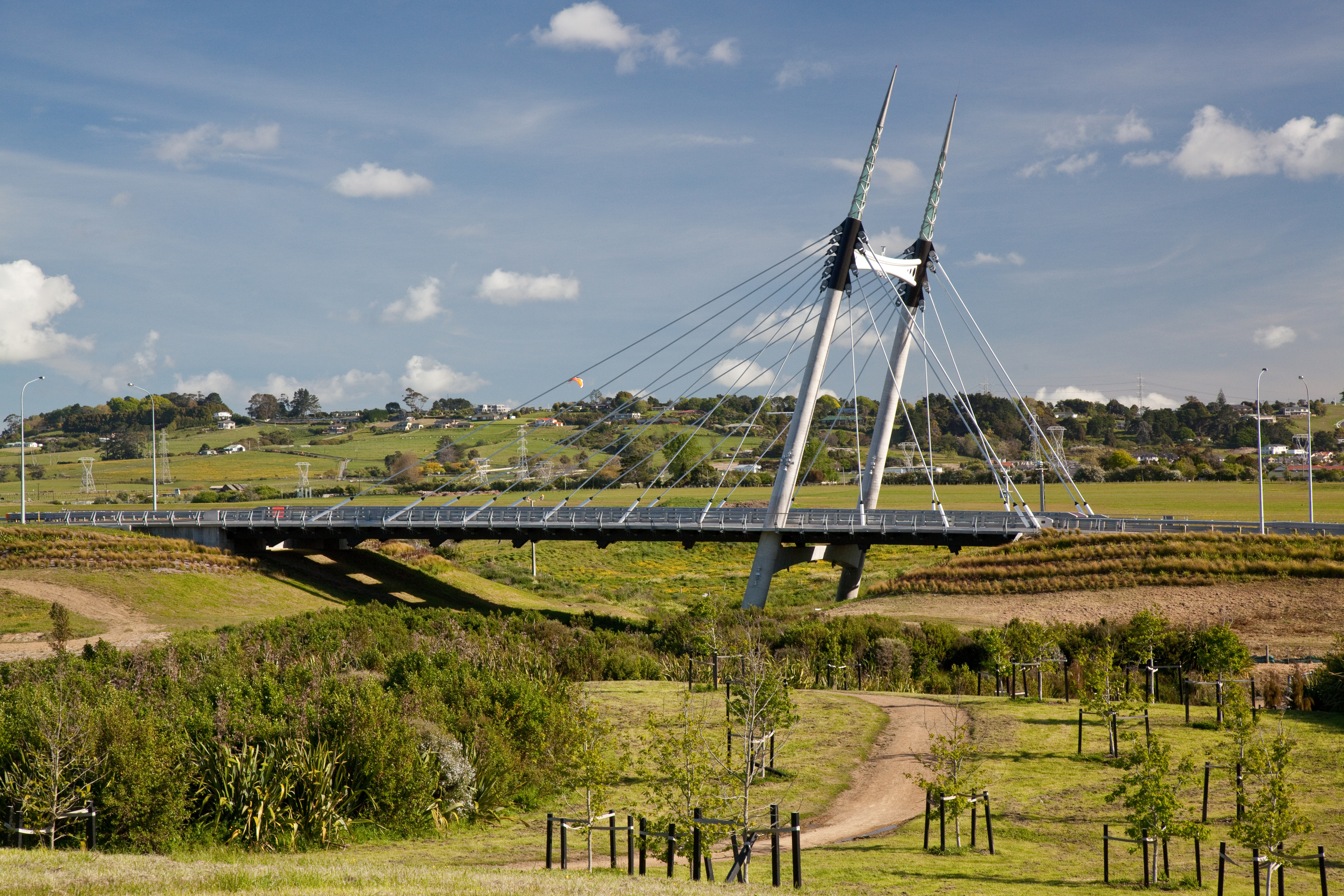
- Cable-stayed bridge on Ormiston Road
- Interactive map of Flat Bush
- Coordinates: 36.9660°S 174.9132°E
- Country: New Zealand
- City: Auckland
- Local authority: Auckland Council
- Electoral ward: Howick ward
- Local board: Howick Local Board
- Board subdivision: Flat Bush

Area
  - Land: 2,190 ha (5,400 acres)

Population (June 2025)
  - Total: 55,920
  - Density: 2,550/km^{2} (6,610/sq mi)
- Hospitals: Ormiston Hospital

East Tāmaki	East Tāmaki Heights	Mission Heights
Ōtara	Flat Bush	Brookby
Clover Park	The Gardens	Ardmore

Flat Bush (also known as Ormiston or Flatbush) is a southern suburb in the city of Auckland, New Zealand. It has recently become one of the city's largest new planned towns after being developed as an urban area of Auckland for several decades. Plans for substantial expansion began under the former Manukau City Council — having bought 290 hectares in the area in 1996.

As of 2023, substantial residential development means the area has grown to over 45,000 people, a similar population to Nelson, and includes a large shopping centre: Ormiston Town Centre.

== History ==
=== Early history ===
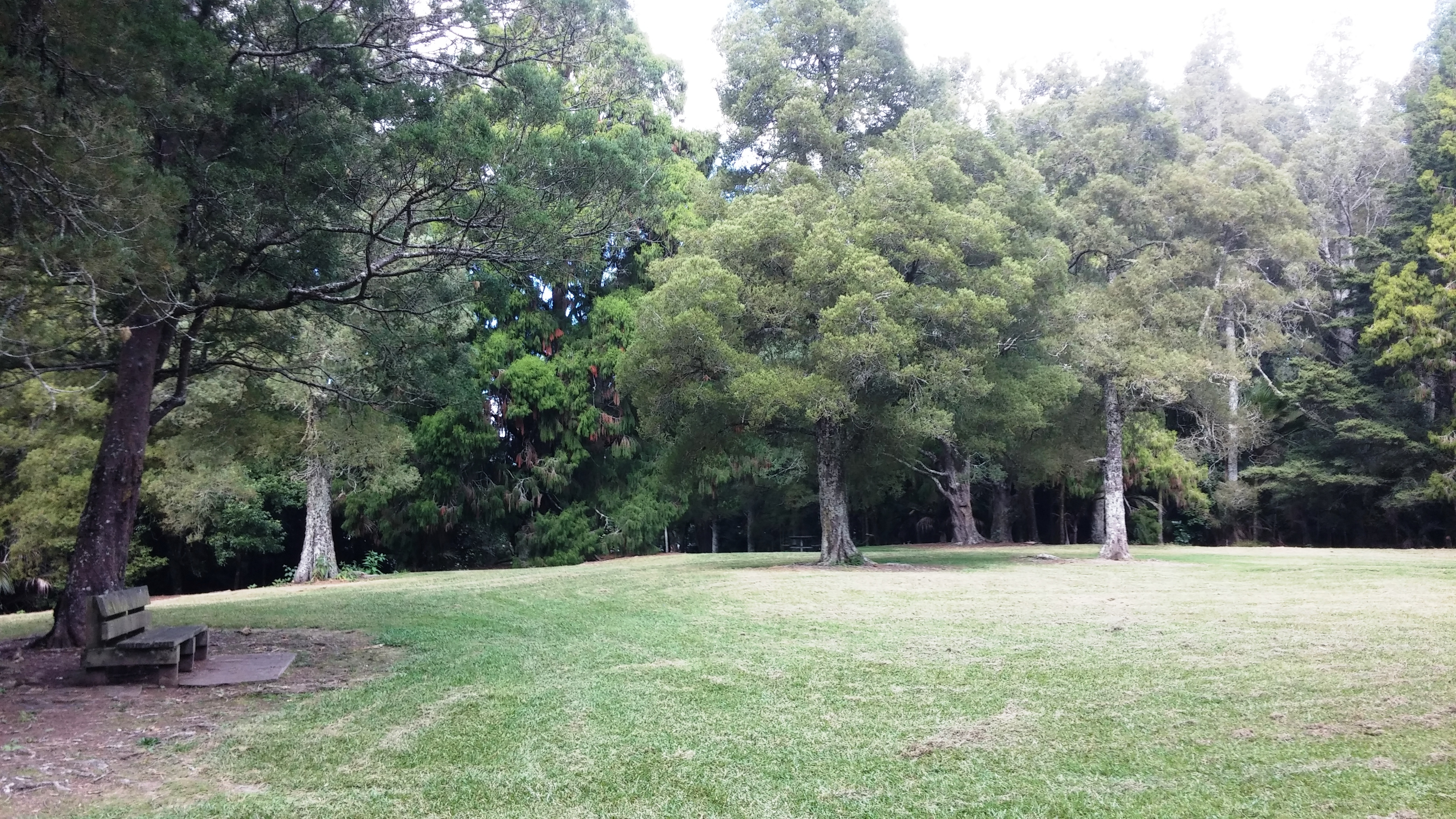
The flat tops of kahikatea forest in areas such as Murphy's Bush led to the name Flat Bush

The Flat Bush area is part of the rohe of Ngāi Tai ki Tāmaki, who descend from the crew of the Tainui komanawa waka, who visited the area around the year 1300. The traditional name for the wider forested area was Te Hūnua, a name now essentially applied to the Hūnua Ranges. Ngāi Tai centred life along the coasts between the Tāmaki River and Wairo River, settling at locationsin an annual cycle of encampments based on what resources were seasonally available. Puke-i-Āki-Rangi was a defended Ngāi Tai pā site. The name literally means "The Hill That Way Propelled Skyward". Over time, Ngāi Tai formed unions with many Tāmaki Māori groups in the area, including Waiohua and Ngāti Pāoa. During the Musket Wars in the 1820s, Ngāi Tai Ki Tāmaki sought temporary refuge in the Waikato.

In 1836, English missionary William Thomas Fairburn brokered a land sale between Tāmaki Māori chiefs covering the majority of modern-day South Auckland and East Auckland. The sale was envisioned as a way to end hostilities in the area, but it is unclear what the chiefs understood or consented to. Māori continued to live in the area, unchanged by this sale. In 1854 when Fairburn's purchase was investigated by the New Zealand Land Commission, a Ngāi Tai reserve was created around the Wairoa River and Umupuia areas, and as a part of the agreement, members of Ngāi Tai agreed to leave their traditional settlements to the west.

In 1847, Howick was established as a defensive outpost for Auckland, by fencibles (retired British Army soldiers) and their families. During the 1850s, the area was generally referred to as the Howick Ranges. The first recorded references to the area being called Flat Bush are from 1859, the name coming from the kahikatea forests of the area, which looked especially flat when viewed from the surrounding hills. The name was well established by the 1860s.

The wider East Tāmaki area was settled primarily by Scottish and Irish Presbyterian settlers. Originally growing crops such as potatoes, oats and wheat, by the turn of the century, many of these farms were converted into dairy farms. Baverstock Road School, the first school in the area, was established in 1875, renamed East Tamaki School in 1884 and Flat Bush School in 1894. It was closed in 1937 when the Howick District High School was opened. In 1921, the East Tāmaki Co-operative Dairy Company was formed, producing milk and butter for the wider Auckland area.

=== Suburban development ===
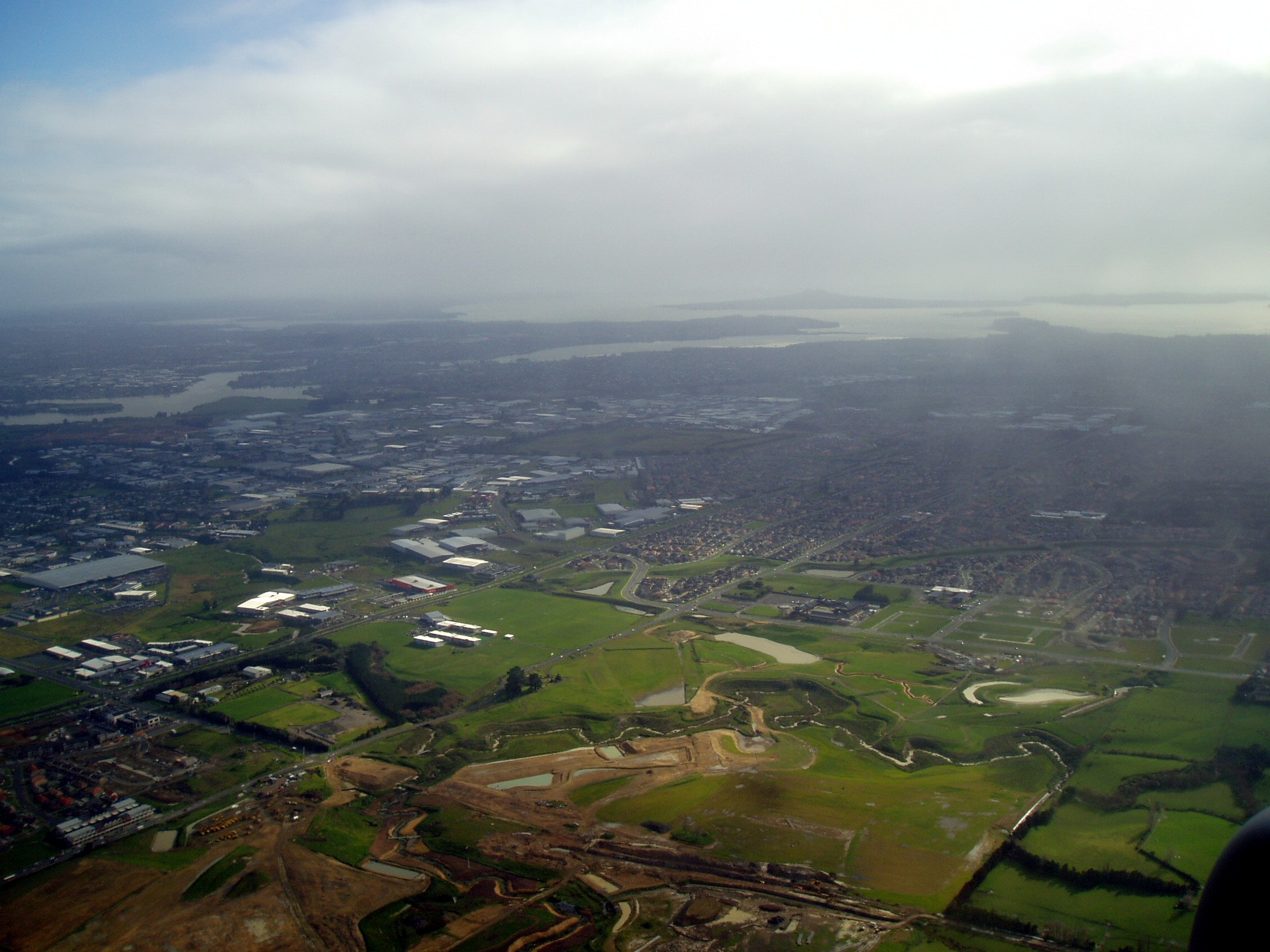
Aerial view of Flat Bush during construction (2006).

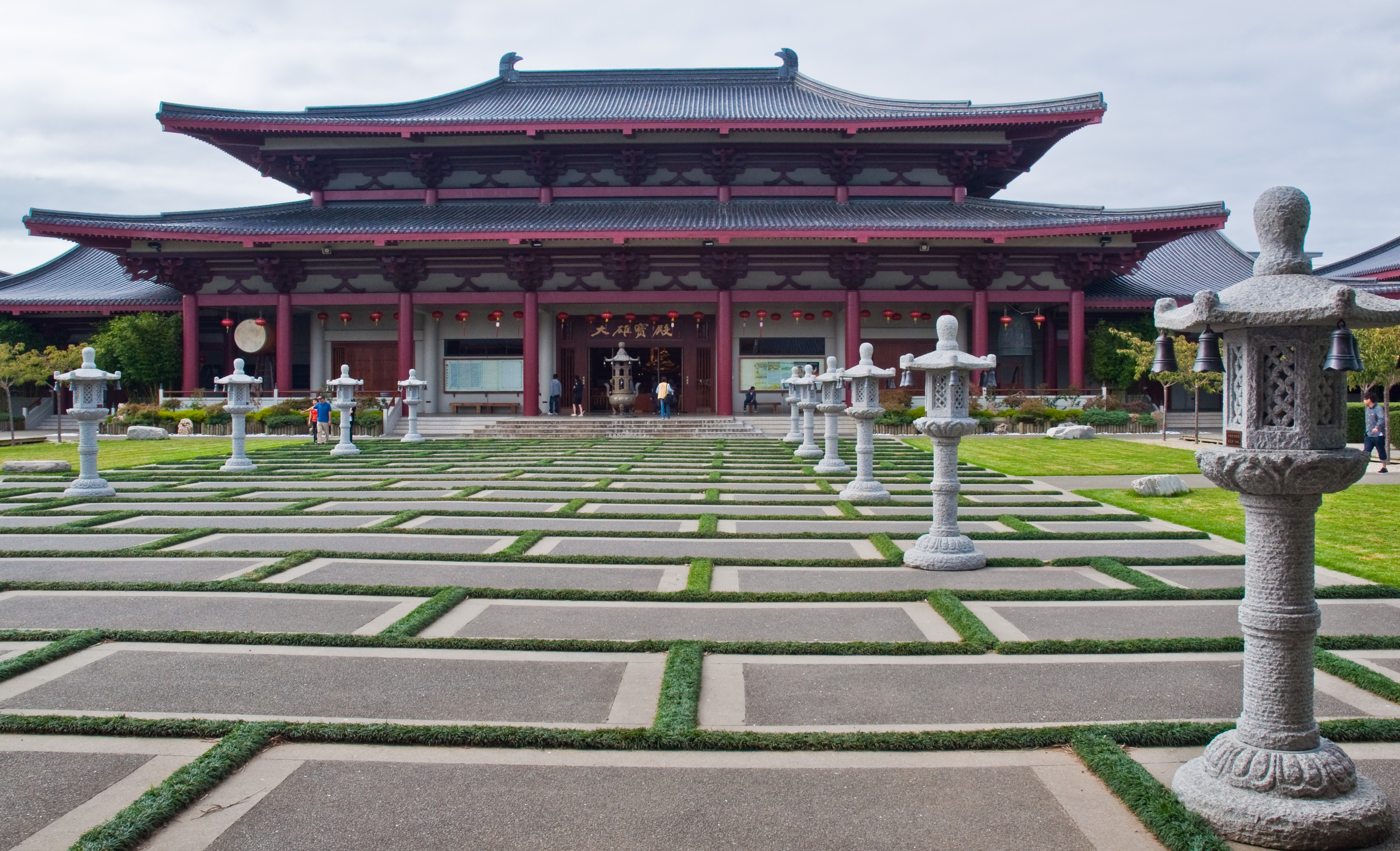
Fo Guang Shan Buddhist Temple

The Manukau City Council identified Flat Bush as a crucial site for future urban development in the 1970. In 1997, the former Manukau City Council drafted a development plan for Flat Bush, with the first construction beginning in 1998 in the Chapel Park subdivision. Swathes of new residential subdivisions were dubbed Ormiston in the mid-2000s. The name Ormiston originated from Ormiston Road, which was named after Tom and Mary Ann Ormiston, who farmed in the area from 1915. By the mid-2000s, the population of Flat Bush was greatly increasing.

In 2007, Fo Guang Shan Temple, the largest Buddhist temple in New Zealand, was officially opened In the following year, New Zealand's first cable-stayed bridge on Ormiston Road was constructed. The suburb contains the 94-hectare Barry Curtis Park, named in recognition of Manukau's longest standing mayor, Barry Curtis,

The suburb's new shopping centre, Ormiston Town Centre, was officially opened to the public on 25 March 2021. The Flat Bush area is expected to grow to 40,000 residents by 2025.

== Demographics ==
Flat Bush covers 21.90 km^{2} (8.46 sq mi) and had an estimated population of 55,920 as of June 2025, with a population density of 2,553 people per km^{2}.

Historical population
Year	Pop.	±% p.a.
2006	12,210	—
2013	23,217	+9.62%
2018	32,244	+6.79%
2023	45,147	+6.96%
The 2006 population is for a smaller area of 19.58 km^{2}. Source:

Flat Bush had a population of 45,147 in the 2023 New Zealand census, an increase of 12,903 people (40.0%) since the 2018 census, and an increase of 21,930 people (94.5%) since the 2013 census. There were 22,560 males, 22,512 females and 72 people of other genders in 11,022 dwellings. 2.2% of people identified as LGBTIQ+. The median age was 33.9 years (compared with 38.1 years nationally). There were 9,297 people (20.6%) aged under 15 years, 9,810 (21.7%) aged 15 to 29, 22,047 (48.8%) aged 30 to 64, and 3,993 (8.8%) aged 65 or older.

People could identify as more than one ethnicity. The results were 14.7% European (Pākehā); 5.7% Māori; 12.0% Pasifika; 71.6% Asian; 3.0% Middle Eastern, Latin American and African New Zealanders (MELAA); and 2.5% other, which includes people giving their ethnicity as "New Zealander". English was spoken by 85.6%, Māori language by 1.1%, Samoan by 4.0%, and other languages by 52.5%. No language could be spoken by 2.7% (e.g. too young to talk). New Zealand Sign Language was known by 0.3%. The percentage of people born overseas was 63.2, compared with 28.8% nationally.

Religious affiliations were 29.5% Christian, 15.2% Hindu, 5.8% Islam, 0.3% Māori religious beliefs, 5.4% Buddhist, 0.1% New Age, and 8.7% other religions. People who answered that they had no religion were 29.7%, and 5.5% of people did not answer the census question.

Of those at least 15 years old, 11,055 (30.8%) people had a bachelor's or higher degree, 12,849 (35.8%) had a post-high school certificate or diploma, and 11,946 (33.3%) people exclusively held high school qualifications. The median income was $46,200, compared with $41,500 nationally. 4,098 people (11.4%) earned over $100,000 compared to 12.1% nationally. The employment status of those at least 15 was that 20,403 (56.9%) people were employed full-time, 3,744 (10.4%) were part-time, and 1,032 (2.9%) were unemployed.

Individual statistical areas
Name	Area (km^{2})	Population	Density (per km^{2})	Dwellings	Median age	Median income
Savonna	0.64	2,643	4,130	696	39.2 years	$43,600
Baverstock	1.46	4,185	2,866	1,077	35.7 years	$44,100
Ormiston North	1.67	2,106	1,263	561	36.3 years	$46,700
Chapel Downs	0.76	3,255	4,283	885	33.0 years	$38,400
Mission Heights North	1.07	3,336	3,118	885	36.8 years	$44,500
Donegal Park West	0.47	2,652	5,643	771	36.4 years	$35,500
Donegal Park East	0.44	2,247	5,107	432	32.5 years	$49,100
Ormiston Central	1.34	4,443	3,316	1,056	33.8 years	$47,200
Ormiston South	1.00	4,026	4,026	780	32.4 years	$49,900
Mission Heights South	0.87	3,702	4,255	879	33.5 years	$47,300
Hilltop	1.14	4,203	3,687	1,071	32.9 years	$48,000
Ormiston East	1.40	3,351	2,394	651	31.9 years	$44,800
Bremner Ridge	1.46	2,385	1,634	525	32.3 years	$54,100
Ormiston South East	1.56	1,008	646	318	31.1 years	$57,400
Tuscany Heights	6.62	1,605	242	438	40.8 years	$53,900
New Zealand					38.1 years	$41,500

== Education ==
A strategy to build schools in the area was developed by the Ministry of Education in 2007.

Ormiston Senior College is a senior secondary school for years 11–13 with a roll of 1,539. Ormiston Junior College covers years 7–10 and has a roll of 1,509 students. Ormiston Primary School is a contributing primary school (years 1–6) with 982 students. The three schools are spread over two blocks. The Senior College opened in 2011, the Junior College in 2017, and the primary school in 2015.

Baverstock Oaks School is a primary school while Te Uho o te Nikau Primary School is a full primary school (years 1–8) with rolls of 593 and 617 students, respectively. Baverstock Oaks opened in 2005 and Te Uho o te Nikau in 2019.

Sancta Maria College is a state-integrated Catholic secondary school (years 7–13) with a roll of 1,049. Sancta Maria Catholic Primary School is a state-integrated contributing primary school (years 1–6) with 377 students. The two schools are on the same site. The college opened in 2004 and the primary school in 2010.

Tyndale Park Christian School is a private composite school (years 1–13) with a roll of 115. The school was founded in 1981.

All these schools are coeducational. Rolls are as of July 2026.

== Amenities ==
Murphy's Bush is a nature reserve in Flat Bush, that features a historic precinct and the largest remnant forest in Auckland.

== Bibliography ==
- Clark, Jennifer A. (2002). East Tamaki: Including the Adjoining Areas of Flat Bush and Otara. Papatoetoe Historical Society. ISBN 0-473-09058-9. OCLC 156099387. Wikidata Q120020174.
- La Roche, Alan (2011). Grey's Folly: A History of Howick, Pakuranga, Bucklands-Eastern Beaches, East Tamaki, Whitford, Beachlands and Maraetai. Auckland: Tui Vale Productions. ISBN 978-0-473-18547-3. OCLC 1135039710. Wikidata Q118286377.
