= Ormiston Town Centre =

- Location: Flat Bush, Auckland, New Zealand
- Coordinates: 36.96489°S 174.91328°E
- Address: 240 Ormiston Road, Flat Bush, Auckland
- Opened: 25 March 2021; 5 years ago
- Developer: Todd Property Group
- Architect: NH Architecture & Jasmax
- Num. of stores: 76
- Num. of anchor tenants: 4 - New World, Hoyts, The Warehouse, Noel Leeming
- Floor area: 30,000 m^{2} (320,000 sq ft)
- Parking: 1,000+
- Website: https://www.ormistontown.co.nz/

Ormiston Town Centre is a large shopping centre located in the Auckland suburb of Flat Bush (also known as Ormiston) in New Zealand. The centre was developed by Todd Property Group in partnership with Panuku Development Auckland and was officially opened in March 2021.

The area is adjacent to Barry Curtis Park and Te Irirangi Drive.

== Development ==
The shopping centre is part of a 19-hectare development on Auckland Council property near Ormiston Road. In total the centres construction cost a total of $250 million. The shopping centre was constructed to serve the rapidly developing suburb of Flat Bush.

Stage 1 of the development was completed in 2015 creating small retail premises and a supermarket.

Stage 2 introduced a 40,000 m^{2} (430,000 sq ft) enclosed shopping centre with over 90 stores and started construction in October 2018. Stage 2 of the centre was scheduled to open in October 2020, however because of constraints linked to the COVID-19 pandemic, it would instead open in March 2021.

=== Plans ===
Barry Curtis Park will be further developed to link with the retail centre, which would also feature additional areas for mixed-use development and community centres.

== See also ==
- List of shopping centres in New Zealand
