= Murphy's Bush =

Forest in East Auckland, New Zealand

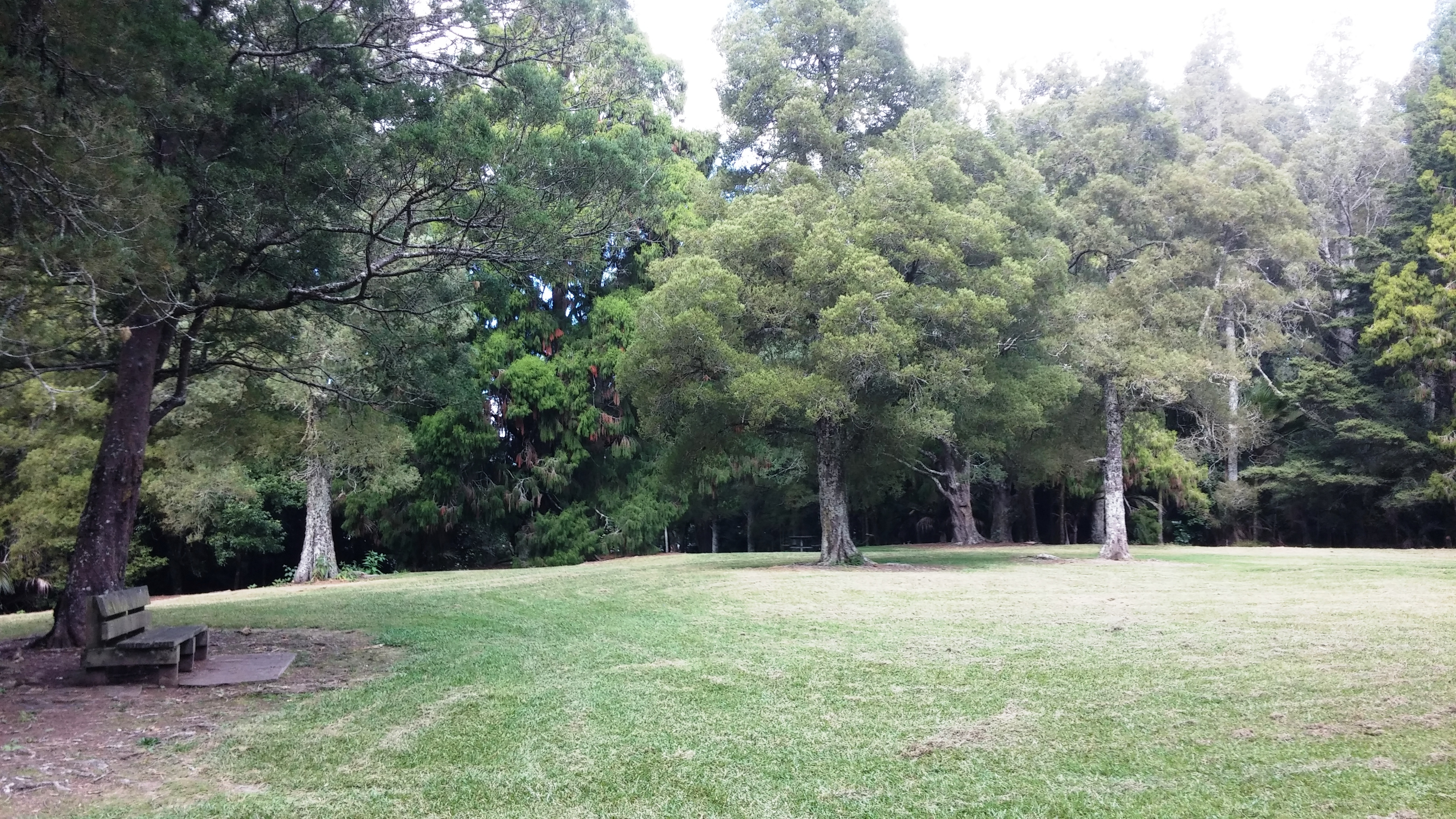
- Interactive map of Murphy's Bush
- Coordinates: 36°40′05″S 174°42′50″E
- Area: 26 hectares (64 acres)

Murphy's Bush is a protected forested area in Flat Bush in East Auckland, New Zealand. The reserve features a remnant kahikatea forest, and is the largest remaining lowland bush in metropolitan Auckland.

== Geography and biodiversity ==
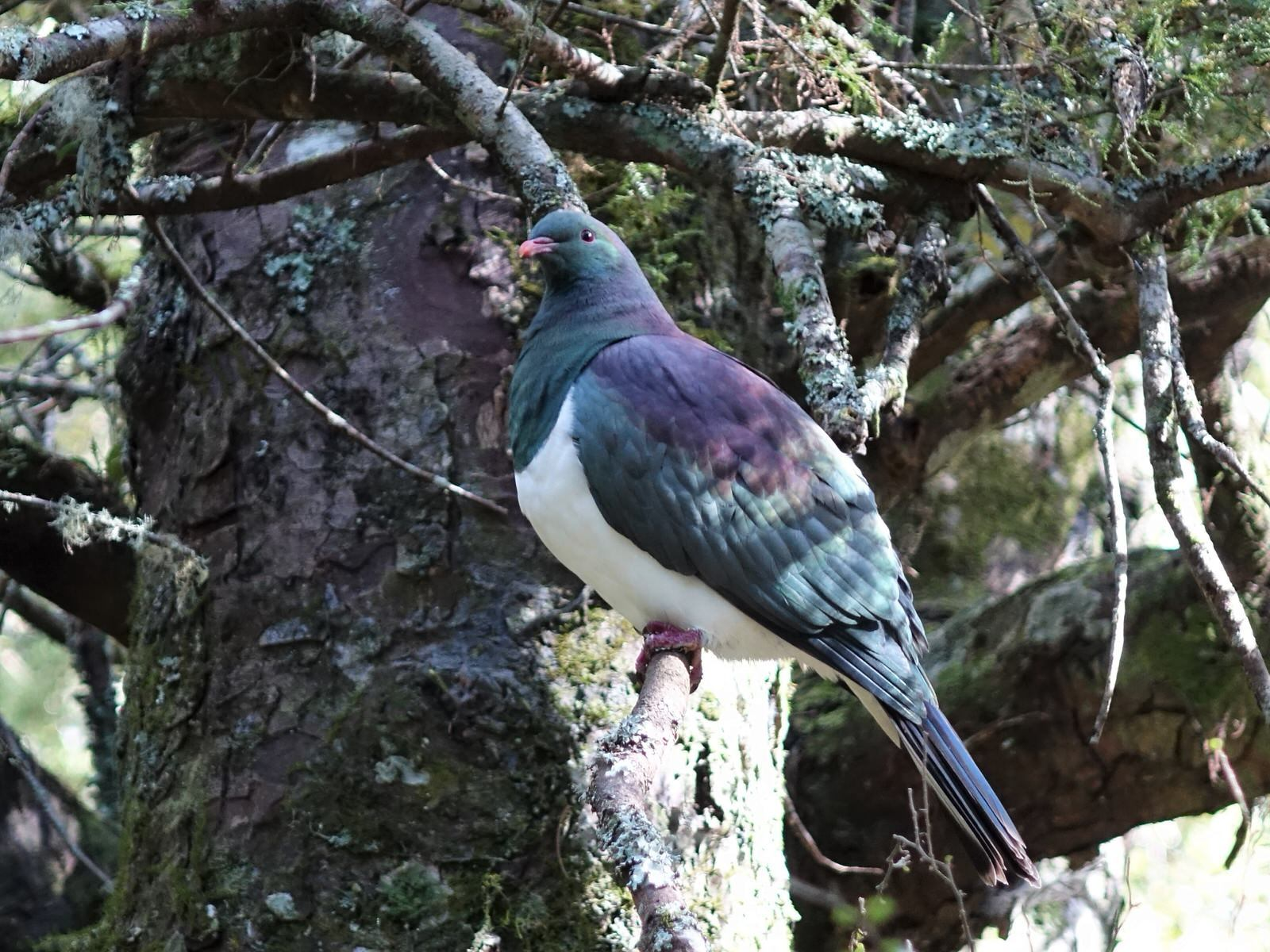
A kererū resting on a kahikatea branch

Murphy's Bush is located in Flat Bush, along Murphys Road. The forest is dominated by kahikatea trees, and also consists of mature rimu, pūriri and tōtara. It is the largest remaining area of mature lowland bush in Auckland.

== History ==
The area is part of traditional Tāmaki Māori lands, including those of Ngāi Tai ki Tāmaki, Ngāti Pāoa, Waiohua and Ngāti Tamaterā. The Flat Bush School House was built adjacent to the forest in 1877, and actively used until 1929. The forest was a part of the Murphy family's farm. Conway Murphy purposefully kept his cattle away from the forest in order to preserve it. The bush was occasionally used by the Pakuranga Hunt for hare hunting.

The forest was gifted to the Manukau City Council in 1981 by the Murphy family. In 2012, Stancombe Cottage, a farmhouse constructed in the 1870s, was moved from its original location on Stancombe Road to the reserve adjacent to the Flat Bush School House, where a heritage precinct is being constructed.

== Amenities ==
Murphy's Bush Reserve has several walking tracks, and a mix of forested and open grassland areas.
