= Ernest Jenner =

New Zealand pianist, music teacher and composer

Ernest Albert Frederick Jenner MBE (8 August 1892 – 7 April 1971) was a New Zealand pianist, music teacher and composer.

== Early life and education ==
He was born in Chatham, Kent, England, on 8 August 1892. He attended Sir Joseph Williamson's Mathematical School in Rochester and was a chorister at Westminster Cathedral in London. He wished to pursue a musical career but his parents insisted he attend teachers college, Goldsmiths' Training College in London.

== Career ==
Jenner taught for seven years in Bexley after which he studied music at the Tobias Matthay Pianoforte School. In 1925 he studied at the Royal Academy of Music, becoming a sub-professor of piano in 1926. In London he was pianist for theatre orchestras and performed as a soloist.

In 1928 he emigrated to Wellington, New Zealand, taking up a position of lecturer in music at the Wellington Teachers' Training College. The college closed in 1932 as a result of the depression and after which Jenner took up the same position at the Christchurch Teachers' Training College, which had been vacated by Vernon Griffiths. He retired in 1954.

Jenner continued as a performer, in chamber music and as a concerto pianist. He performed with the National Orchestra in 1954. He was soloist in performances of John Ireland's Piano Concerto. He was conductor of several choirs: Basilica of the Sacred Heart in Wellington, Church of St Michael and All Angels, and Liederkränzchen (a women's choir) and, from 1937, the Royal Christchurch Musical Society in Christchurch.

As a composer he wrote piano pieces, songs and cantatas. He wrote books on music tuition, especially sight-singing, and a church music course for Catholic schools; he was also a broadcaster and music critic for the Christchurch Press.

== Honours and awards ==
In the 1962 New Year Honours, Jenner was appointed a Member of the Order of the British Empire, for services to music. He was elected as a fellow of the Royal Academy of Music in 1950.

== Personal life ==
Jenner married Agnes Lavinia Marriott in 1915 and they had five daughters and three sons.

== Selected works ==
=== Compositions and arrangements ===
- Junior sight-singing and songs for schools (1937)
- Senior sight-singing and songs for schools (1937)
- Chants, motets and modal settings : for Catholic schools and choirs. Book I (1937)
- Flower fancies : three miniatures for piano (1944)
- The children's mass and hymn book (1949)
- Country scenes : a little suite of imaginative pieces for piano with percussion band (1949)
- Music for Palm Sunday : restored order : modern settings (1956)
- 20 songs for the school year (1959)

=== Books ===
- Songs for children and how to use them : composed for the purpose of building up a picture modulator for use in teaching sight singing from staff notation (1932)
- Songs and lesson material for the school music course : designed for teaching staff sight-singing and musical knowledge through actual music (1933)
- Lesson plans in music appreciation : listening lessons from gramophone records with associated songs and simple rhythmic hand-movements that ensure right hearing (1936)
- A church music course for Catholic schools. Book I (1936) – followed by Book II (1938) and Book III (1939)
- The orchestra and its music (1948)
- Junior music-reading and songs for schools : a course in vocal music (1950)
- Overtures : their origin, history and design : together with the stories of some well-known overtures (1950)
