= Barry Curtis (mayor) =

New Zealand politician (1939–2026)

Sir Barry Curtis JP
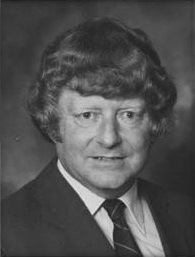
- Curtis, c. 1980

3rd Mayor of Manukau City
- In office 8 October 1983 – 13 October 2007
- Preceded by: Lloyd Elsmore
- Succeeded by: Len Brown

Personal details
- Born: Barry John Curtis; 27 February 1939 Auckland, New Zealand
- Died: 30 March 2026 (aged 87)
- Party: National
- Spouse: Miriam Ann Brooke (m. 1961)
- Children: 3
- Profession: Surveyor and town planner

Sir Barry John Curtis JP (27 February 1939 – 30 March 2026) was a New Zealand politician, who served as mayor of Manukau City from 1983 until 2007. When he announced his intention to retire in 2007, he was New Zealand's longest-serving mayor at that time.

== Background ==
Curtis was born in Auckland on 27 February 1939, the son of John Dixon Cory Curtis and Vera Gladys Curtis (née Johnson), and educated at Otahuhu College. He undertook further study through the Technical Correspondence Institute, Wellington, and the University of Auckland, gaining a Diploma of Town Planning, and eventually becoming a town planning consultant and registered surveyor.

In 1961, Curtis married Miriam Ann Brook, and the couple went on to have three children.

== Political career ==
Curtis was first elected as a Manukau City councillor in 1968, three years after Manukau City was formed and was re-elected in 1971, 1974, 1977 and 1980. He was also elected in 1971 to the Auckland Regional Authority, the predecessor of the Auckland Regional Council and was re-elected in 1974, 1977, 1980 and 1983. From 1977 to 1983 he was chairman of the Authority's regional planning committee.

In 1974, Curtis challenged Gavin Downie for the National Party nomination for the seat of Pakuranga after many local party members became dissatisfied with Downie's performance. He was unsuccessful in his challenge, but was persuaded to stand for the seat at the 1975 general election as an independent candidate. Curtis placed a distant fifth out of seven candidates with 356 votes (1.46% of the vote). Downie was re-elected.

Curtis was elected Mayor of Manukau City in 1983, and was re-elected in 1986, 1989, 1992, 1995, 1998, 2001 and 2004. He stood down in October 2007 at the triennial elections, succeeded by Len Brown. He was the longest serving Mayor of Manukau City with 39 years of continuous service to the people of Manukau and the Auckland Region.

In 1990, Curtis was awarded the New Zealand 1990 Commemoration Medal, and in the 1992 New Year Honours, he was appointed a Knight Bachelor, for services to local government and the community.

== Later life and death ==
When he retired, Curtis moved to Eastern Beach, having lived most of his life in nearby Bucklands Beach.

Curtis died on 30 March 2026, at the age of 87.

== Honorific eponym ==
Barry Curtis Park in Flat Bush is named in his honour.

== Positions held ==
- Mayor of Manukau City (1983–2007)
- Member of the Auckland Regional Authority (1971–1983)
- Chairman of the Auckland Regional Authority Planning Committee (1977–1983)
- Chair of the Auckland Mayoral Forum
- Patron of South Auckland Hospice, Auckland Hockey Association and many other community organisations in Manukau City
- Chairman of the National Taskforce for the Reduction of Community Violence Leaders Group
- Member of the Auckland Regional Land Transport Committee (1990–2007)
- Deputy Chairman of Auckland Regional Growth Strategy Forum (1996–2007)
- Chairman of the Auckland Regional Economic Development Strategy (AREDS) Establishment Group (2002–2006)
- Trustee of the TelstraClear Pacific Events Trust Board
- Patron of the Pakuranga Tennis Club

Political offices
Preceded by Lloyd Elsmore	Mayor of Manukau City; 1983–2007	Succeeded by Len Brown
