= Mayor of Manukau City =

- Style: His Worship
- Term length: Three years, renewable
- Inaugural holder: Hugh Lambie
- Formation: 1965
- Final holder: Len Brown
- Abolished: 2010
- Superseded by: Mayor of Auckland

The Mayor of Manukau City was the head of the municipal government of Manukau City, New Zealand, from 1965 to 2010, and presided over the Manukau City Council. The mayor was directly elected using a first-past-the-post electoral system. The last serving mayor, elected in 2007, was Len Brown. Manukau City Council was abolished on 31 October 2010 and was incorporated into the Auckland Council, for which elections were held on 9 October 2010.

== History ==
The wider South Auckland area was administered by numerous small road boards. The Franklin and Manukau Counties Act 1911 resulted in the formation of Manukau County and Franklin County in 1912. The first elections were held in Manukau County in June 1912, returning seven councillors. On 1 June, four councillors were declared elected unopposed: Hugh R. McKenzie (Māngere Riding); Sydney J. Harbutt (Ōtāhuhu), John Consentine Bryant (Papatoetoe) and Captain Frank Colbeck (Papakura). The other three elected at the polls on 10 June were Alexander David Bell (Wairoa), Francis Henry Brownhill (Turanga) and Alfred Edward Hattaway (Pakuranga). On 21 June the newly elected council held its first meeting in the Agricultural Association offices in High Street, Auckland, and elected Cr McKenzie as the first County chairman. Cr Harbutt resigned on 20 September 1912, after Otahuhu had become a separate borough.

Manukau City Council was formally constituted on 3 September 1965 from the amalgamation of Manukau County Council and Manurewa Borough. The new city was divided into the Clevedon, Māngere, Manurewa, Otara and Pakuranga wards for electoral purposes. The mayor was elected at large and Hugh Lambie was returned unopposed in the 1965 election. In addition, 18 councillors were elected across five wards. Ian Aplin also became councillor for the Clevedon ward unopposed. The successful candidates at the polls were: Jim Anderton, Roger Douglas, Clyde Ellett and Hugh Graham for Mangere; Harry Beaumont, William Berridge, Jack Cloherty, Chris Mountfort, Bernard Ross and Robert Ross for Manurewa; Pearl Baker, Alexander Cowie and Murray Freer for Otara; and Laurence Gregory, Frank Malcolm, Charles Mason and Desmond Molesworth for Pakuranga. At the first council meeting on 22 October 1965, Manurewa councillor Mountfort was elected as deputy-mayor.

Māngere councillors Jim Anderton and Roger Douglas both later gained seats in Parliament. Anderton resigned in August 1968 when he moved to Remuera, and Douglas did not stand for re-election in 1968, but successfully stood for parliament in the Manukau electorate in the 1969 election.

== List of office holders ==
The following persons served as mayor of Manukau City:

	Name	Portrait	Term
1	Hugh Lambie		1965–1968
2	Lloyd Elsmore		1968–1983
3	Barry Curtis		1983–2007
4	Len Brown		2007–2010
