= Barry Curtis Park =

Urban park in Auckland, New Zealand

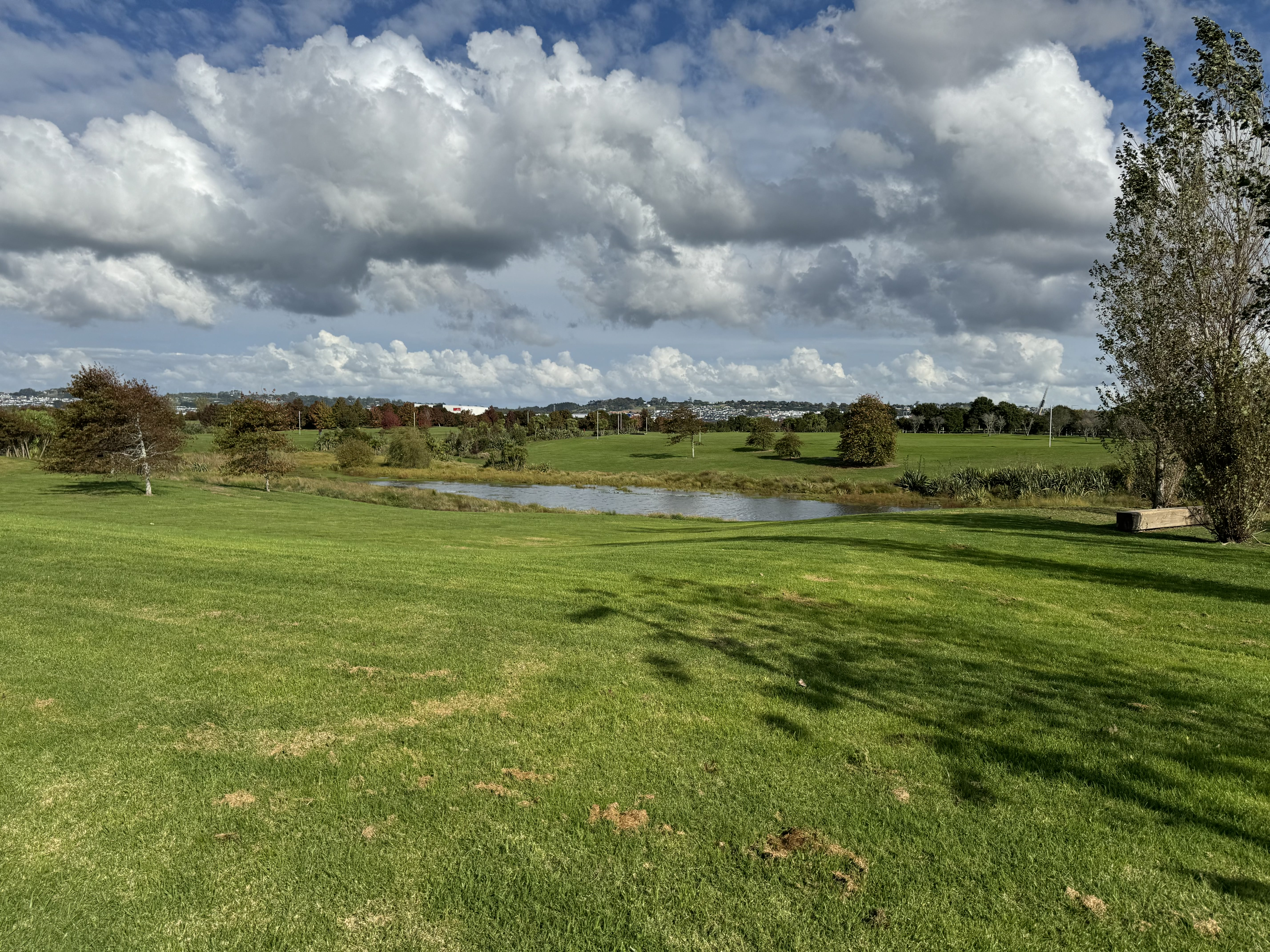
- View of Barry Curtis Park pointing towards Ormiston Town Centre
- Interactive map of Barry Curtis Park
- Location: Flat Bush, Auckland
- Coordinates: 36.963889°S 174.909333°E
- Area: 94 hectares (230 acres)
- Operator: Auckland Council
- Open: April 2009
- Status: Open

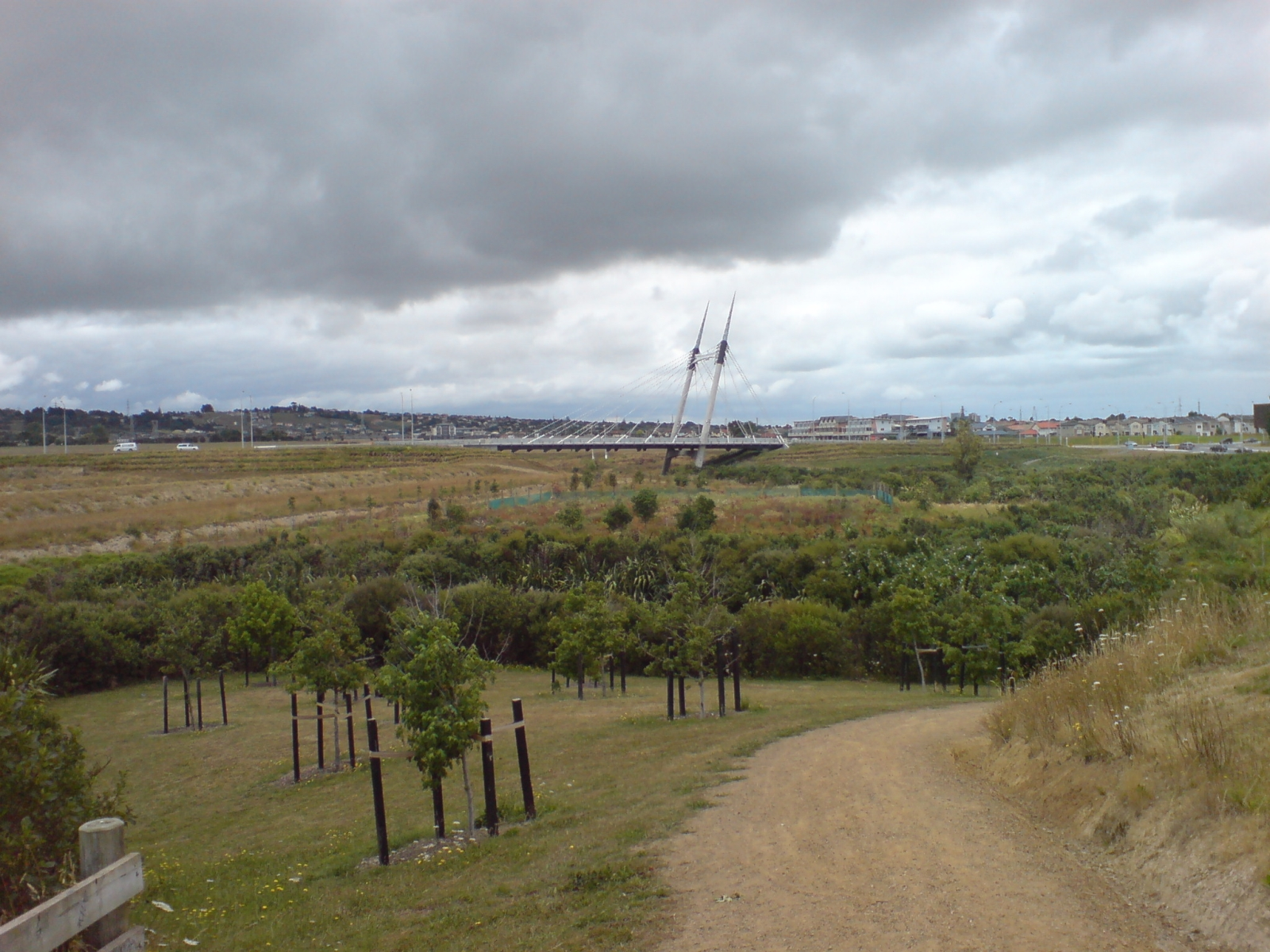
Looking over south over new planting onto the Ormiston Road Bridge, the gateway feature for Flat Bush. The road that the bridge carries over the creek also marks the boundary between the northern and southern halves of the park, with the southern half still unfinished as of 2010.

Barry Curtis Park is a park named after Barry Curtis in Flat Bush, Manukau City of which the first stage was opened in April 2009. At 94 hectares (230 acres), it is one of New Zealand's largest parks, of a size as has not been established since the Auckland Domain in the 1840s.

The park was created from a part of a large parcel of dairy farming land the Manukau City Council bought from the Anglican Church Trust Board, at $2.9 million for 290 hectares (720 acres) total.

The park is the central piece of a 'Green fingers' network of parks that is being established (mostly aligned along around 45 km of streams and creeks draining the Flat Bush catchment). The ecological system involved consultation with groups such as Forest & Bird and the Auckland Regional Council. The water systems also work as stormwater ponds, and have been fitted with fish ladders to ensure connected water habitats.

The park (in the already established section) also includes event spaces and large playgrounds for children, with a multi-sports centre, playing fields to be added in the future. The park is to establish a network of educational trails in addition to the main routes.

The park received an 'Outstanding Award' from the New Zealand Recreation Association, as well as three awards from the New Zealand Institute of Landscape Architects (Gold: Barry Curtis Park Wetland Playground (at Stancombe Road), Silver: Barry Curtis Park Signature Areas design, Silver: Barry Curtis Park Project Management).
