= East Tāmaki Heights =

- Suburb
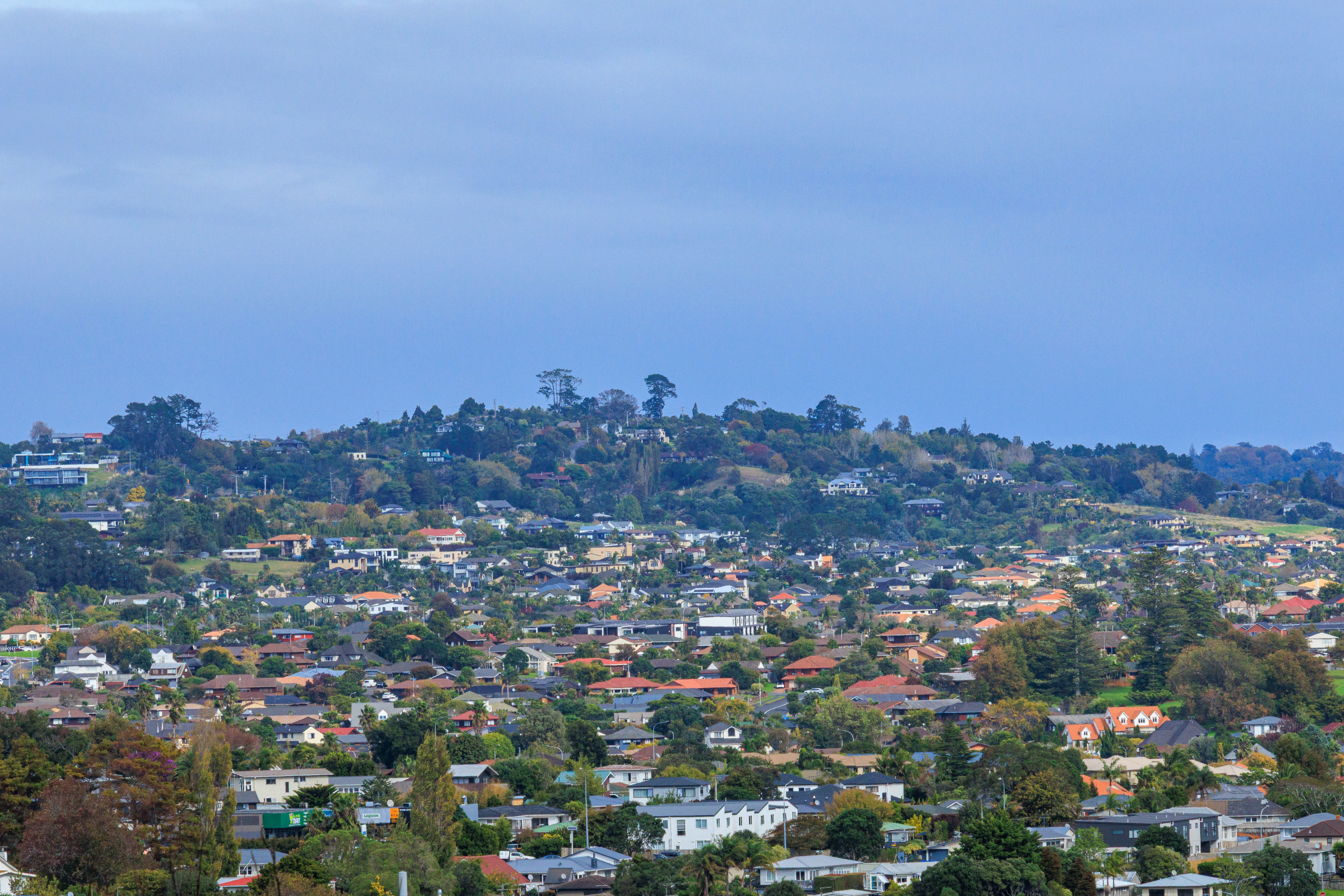
- View of Puke-i-Āki-Rangi and East Tāmaki Heights from Stockade Hill
- Interactive map of East Tāmaki Heights
- Coordinates: 36.942°S 174.920°E
- Country: New Zealand
- City: Auckland
- Local authority: Auckland Council
- Electoral ward: Howick ward
- Local board: Howick Local Board

Area
  - Land: 197 ha (490 acres)

Population (June 2025)
  - Total: 6,090
  - Density: 3,090/km^{2} (8,010/sq mi)

Botany	Dannemora
East Tāmaki	East Tāmaki Heights	Whitford
	Flat Bush

East Tāmaki Heights is an eastern suburb of Auckland, New Zealand.

Most of the houses were built in the 2000s. Between 1998 and 2009, the major streets were defined.

== Demographics ==
East Tamaki Heights covers 1.97 km^{2} (0.76 sq mi) and had an estimated population of 6,090 as of June 2025, with a population density of 3,091 people per km^{2}.

Historical population
Year	Pop.	±% p.a.
2006	2,193	—
2013	5,139	+12.94%
2018	5,571	+1.63%
2023	5,547	−0.09%
The 2006 population is for a smaller area of 1.23 km^{2}, the area now called Point View. Source:

East Tamaki Heights had a population of 5,547 in the 2023 New Zealand census, a decrease of 24 people (−0.4%) since the 2018 census, and an increase of 408 people (7.9%) since the 2013 census. There were 2,733 males, 2,799 females and 18 people of other genders in 1,653 dwellings. 2.3% of people identified as LGBTIQ+. The median age was 40.5 years (compared with 38.1 years nationally). There were 933 people (16.8%) aged under 15 years, 1,158 (20.9%) aged 15 to 29, 2,676 (48.2%) aged 30 to 64, and 780 (14.1%) aged 65 or older.

People could identify as more than one ethnicity. The results were 31.1% European (Pākehā); 4.5% Māori; 3.3% Pasifika; 62.5% Asian; 4.5% Middle Eastern, Latin American and African New Zealanders (MELAA); and 3.2% other, which includes people giving their ethnicity as "New Zealander". English was spoken by 87.8%, Māori language by 0.5%, Samoan by 0.6%, and other languages by 51.6%. No language could be spoken by 1.6% (e.g. too young to talk). New Zealand Sign Language was known by 0.3%. The percentage of people born overseas was 58.3, compared with 28.8% nationally.

Religious affiliations were 26.7% Christian, 7.7% Hindu, 5.1% Islam, 0.3% Māori religious beliefs, 4.1% Buddhist, 0.3% New Age, and 4.4% other religions. People who answered that they had no religion were 46.2%, and 5.4% of people did not answer the census question.

Of those at least 15 years old, 1,605 (34.8%) people had a bachelor's or higher degree, 1,746 (37.8%) had a post-high school certificate or diploma, and 1,260 (27.3%) people exclusively held high school qualifications. The median income was $43,700, compared with $41,500 nationally. 747 people (16.2%) earned over $100,000 compared to 12.1% nationally. The employment status of those at least 15 was that 2,400 (52.0%) people were employed full-time, 600 (13.0%) were part-time, and 111 (2.4%) were unemployed.

Individual statistical areas
Name	Area (km^{2})	Population	Density (per km^{2})	Dwellings	Median age	Median income
Middlefield	0.74	2,751	3,718	807	39.9 years	$42,700
Point View	1.23	2,796	2,273	846	41.2 years	$44,900
New Zealand					38.1 years	$41,500
