= Puke-i-Āki-Rangi =

Hill in New Zealand

- Point View
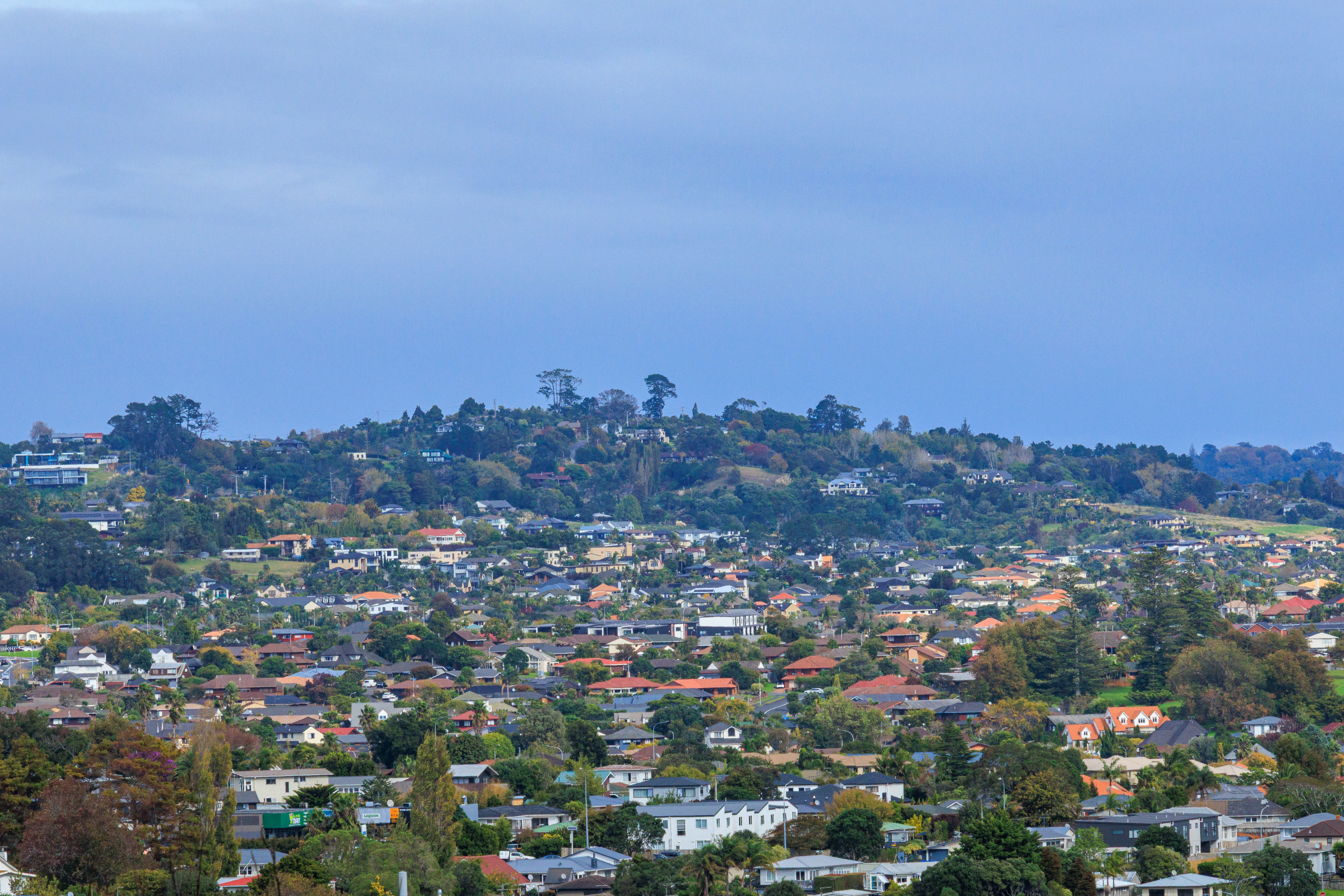
- Puke-i-Āki-Rangi seen from Stockade Hill, Howick

Highest point
- Elevation: 142 m (466 ft)
- Coordinates: 36.949351°S 174.925385°E

Geography
- Location: North Island, New Zealand

Puke-i-Āki-Rangi, commonly known as Point View, is a hill in East Tāmaki Heights, New Zealand.

== Geography ==
Puke-i-Āki-Rangi is a 142-metre hill in East Tāmaki Heights, overlooking East Auckland. The hill is surrounded by a 29 ha (72 acres) reserve.

== Biodiversity ==
Puke-i-Āki-Rangi is known as a habitat for the rare New Zealand long-tailed bat. Native birds can also be found at the reserve, including tūī, pīwakawaka, kererū and riroriro. Much of the hill is surrounded by regenerating native forest.

== History ==
The name Puke-i-Āki-Rangi originated from Ngāi Tai ki Tāmaki, and literally means "The Hill That Way Propelled Skyward". An alternate name used by Ngāi Tai is Puke-ariki ("Hill of the Chief"). The location was the site of a defended pā, and during European times the hill gained the name Point View Pa.

In 1994 the East Tāmaki Reservoir was constructed in Point View Reserve. In 2015, the New Zealand Government reached a treaty settlement with Ngāi Tai ki Tāmaki. During this process, the hill was officially gazetted as Puke-i-Āki-Rangi.
