= National Council of Churches in New Zealand =

- Founded: 1941
- Dissolved: 1989

The National Council of Churches in New Zealand (NCCNZ) was an ecumenical organisation that brought together a number of New Zealand's Christian churches in dialogue and practical cooperation.

The NCCNZ worked in collaboration with ecumenical councils around New Zealand. It was an associate council of the World Council of Churches, a member of the Christian Conference of Asia and a partner of other national ecumenical bodies throughout the world. It was succeeded by the Conference of Churches in Aotearoa New Zealand (which was itself dissolved in 2005). In 2014 the Anglican Church in Aotearoa New Zealand and Polynesia, the Methodist Church of New Zealand and the Roman Catholic Church established the National Dialogue for Christian Unity. The Presbyterian Church of Aotearoa New Zealand and the Religious Society of Friends (Quakers) subsequently joined.

== See also ==
- Christianity in New Zealand
- World Council of Churches
