= Auckland Regional Council =

Former regional council in New Zealand

Auckland Regional Council Te Rauhītanga Taiao

Type
- Type: Regional council of Auckland Region
- Term limits: None

History
- Founded: 1989
- Disbanded: 1 November 2010
- Preceded by: Auckland Regional Authority
- Succeeded by: Auckland Council

Structure
- Length of term: 3 years

Elections
- Voting system: FPP
- Last election: 2007

Website
- arc.govt.nz (archived)

The Auckland Regional Council (ARC) was the regional council (one of the former local government authorities) of the Auckland Region. Its predecessor the Auckland Regional Authority (ARA) was formed in 1963 and became the ARC in 1989. The ARC was subsumed into the Auckland Council on 1 November 2010.

== Formation ==
There had been earlier attempts to rationalise Auckland's local government dating back to the early 1900s. In 1954 the Auckland Regional Planning Authority was established under the Town and Country Planning Act 1953. The authority was mainly involved in planning transport, specifically the Auckland Motorway. The Auckland Regional Planning Authority was an influence for the Auckland Regional Authority. Dove-Myer Robinson in standing for Mayor of Auckland City in 1959 campaigned on wanting to unify all of Auckland. Once elected he sought to build a consensus for reform, starting in 1960 with a meeting of 400 local body politicians from 32 local bodies. An Auckland Regional Authority Establishment Committee resulted. Robinson used the Municipality of Metropolitan Toronto and the Melbourne and Metropolitan Board of Works as models. He started with a draft comprehensive empowering bill but soon ran into opposition, with some Establishment Committee members deliberately avoiding meetings, and the Mayors of the many small boroughs fearing for the ability of their bodies to continue to govern themselves, lobbying against the proposal. Auckland City was the principal supporter of the initiative. A Bill to create the ARA was introduced to Parliament in 1961 but the Establishment Committee then thought better of it and it was withdrawn from the Parliamentary process by the Government. Robinson sought compromises about what was to be included (the Auckland Harbour Board, Electricity Supply Authorities and North Shore Drainage Board were excluded), on representation (appointment by the Local Authorities was used in the first term), on funding (direct rating was excluded) and restricting the role so only specifically empowered functions were allowed. Opposition continued with some parties implacably opposed, others wanting sub-regional councils and some promoting an alternative, much more limited Bill to Parliament. Through a good relationship with the Prime Minister Keith Holyoake, Robinson persuaded the Government to support his second compromise Bill in 1962, which was passed. Many of the compromises persisted though the duration of the ARA and its successor, the ARC. Robinson was rewarded with his election by the Authority members as its first chairman.

== Auckland Regional Authority, 1963–1989 ==
The ARC was preceded by the Auckland Regional Authority (ARA), which was formed in 1963. The ARA took over a number of existing operations from other bodies. One of its first areas of responsibility was bulk water supply, which it assumed from Auckland City Council. Other functions taken over were regional planning, from the Auckland Regional Planning Authority, bulk sewage collection and treatment (south of the harbour only) from the Auckland Metropolitan Drainage Board, bus passenger transport from the Auckland Transport Board, management of the Auckland Airport from the Auckland Airport Committee, management of parks from the Auckland Centennial Memorial Park Board, and the authorities of the Auckland Metropolitan Milk Board. Water supply activities included constructing further bulk water storage dams, and treatment and water distribution works. Other achievements were completing and upgrading the Manukau wastewater treatment plant, creating the largest bus fleet in the country at the time, constructing Auckland Airport representing local government in a joint venture with central government and creating the regional parks network, founded on the Centennial Memorial Park in the Waitākere Ranges which was transferred from Auckland City Council control and added to first with the purchase of what became Wenderholm Regional Park.

Functions added at later dates included a regional role operating and regulating refuse disposal, regional roads, the regional water board under the Water and Soil Conservation Act 1967 and harbour master and marine regulation.

Despite the massive public support for Regional Parks even they were the subject of political division with the rural based district councils successfully resisting paying a contribution towards them. They were essentially built for the urban population and paid for by them.

=== Auckland Rapid Transit ===
The ARA turned its attention to commuter transport. It commissioned a comprehensive transportation plan completed in 1965 – the De Leuw Cather reports. The rail aspect of this made little progress with minimal support from Authority politicians and staff, from Central Government and opposition from other Auckland councils.

The return in 1968 of Dove-Myer Robinson to the Auckland Mayoralty and as a member of the Authority marked a return to progress. A more detailed plan of a rapid transit system was worked on, and a planning committee known as Auckland Rapid Transit was formed. The scheme design as finalised in 1972 had a tight inner city underground ring, operating in one direction only. The existing suburban rail line routes were to be used with track duplication to avoid freight conflicts, with extensions to Hobsonville and Howick and two new lines; under the harbour to Whangaparaoa and south to the Airport.

The station spacings were larger than the existing system and travel speeds would be much higher. Local opposition and obstruction within the elected ARA members continued, as there was from the New Zealand Railways Department and railway unions.

The ruling Labour government showed little enthusiasm for the scheme and proposed a cheaper alternative in 1973 which the ARA seized upon, to Robinson's dismay. The OPEC oil price shock and the 1975 election of the Robert Muldoon-led National government was the end of the scheme. It has been mythologised since then as "Robbies Rapid Rail". ART was disbanded in 1976.

From then on and despite the focus of successor organisations on public transport, ARA had a mixed record on the matter, in 1983 going so far as to propose abolishing the Auckland railway system altogether. As late as 1987, major ARA transport strategy reports were still paying little attention to public transport. In 1975 a documentary was released which charts the short history of the Auckland Rapid Transit project, presented by project manager Ian Mead.

== Local government reforms, 1980s–90s ==
In the late 1980s the Fourth Labour Government, consistent with its policy of corporatising and privatising government-owned entities, looked to other quasi-commercial entities to apply the same process to. Power boards received early attention, but local government was not considered as potential owners of these and their corporatisations proceeded separately. Port authorities were considered part of local government and the Auckland Harbour Board was corporatised in 1988 as Ports of Auckland, with the majority shareholding held by the ARA and the minority by Waikato local government. Some non-commercial assets and maritime regulation came to the ARA. The ARA at one stage looked to sell its holding in the port company but the proposal was defeated politically.

The Government also wanted a more commercial arrangement for the Auckland International Airport and it was corporatised in 1988, with the shareholding split between the Government and Auckland local authorities. Substantial airport reserves were also dispersed to the same parties. The ARA had no ongoing role, despite being the representative of the region's councils in the former joint venture with Government.

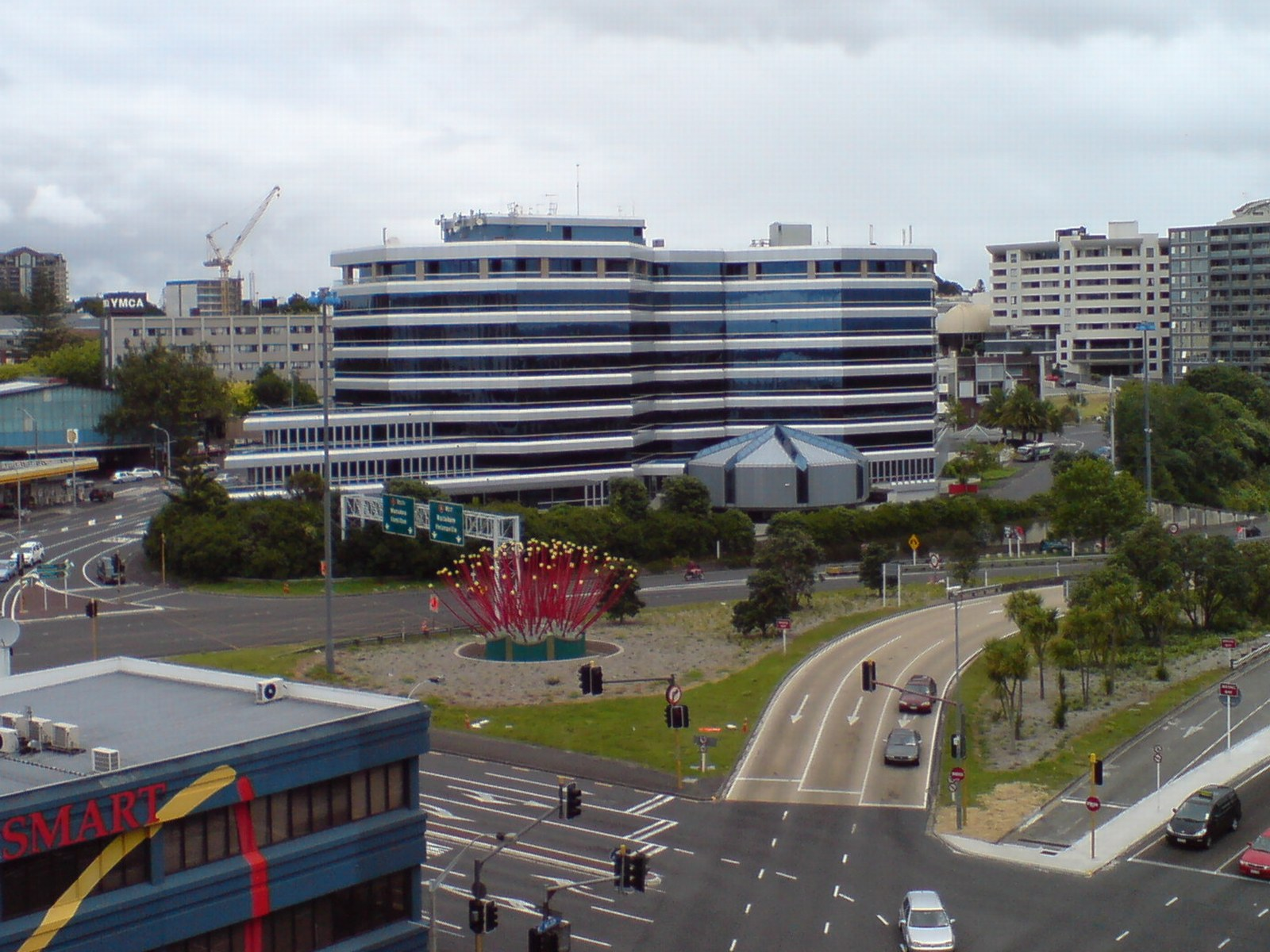
ARC headquarters in Pitt St

In 1989 local government minister Michael Bassett concluded a reform of all local government in New Zealand. This greatly reduced the number of territorial councils in Auckland but did not materially alter the ARA, which essentially retained its previous functions under the new name of Auckland Regional Council. Two functions transferred to the larger territorial councils were regional roads and a role in stormwater on the isthmus. Anticipating a greater role in the region's governance and needing better accommodation for its staff, the ARC commenced acquisition of a new headquarters in Pitt St, completed in 1990. It was a controversial move, the building later criticised by an Audit Office review for being out-sized. The ARC had a guarantee from the developer of rental of the extra space but the failure of that guarantor, owned and asset stripped by Equiticorp, left it worthless. The controversy helped in creating a political justification for the subsequent separation of many of the ARC's functions.

The power to corporatise local government operations as local-authority trading enterprises (LATEs), modelled on state-owned enterprises, was created. However this was voluntary, with the exception of transport, where council road design and delivery operations were required to be corporatised. Council bus operations were likewise required to be corporatised, with the ARC bus operation emerging in 1991 as Transport Auckland Ltd, trading as the Yellow Bus Company. The ARC studied forming its commercial operations into LATEs held under a holding company, but was injuncted by Auckland City Council in respect of the water and wastewater function and had a failure of political will in execution.

Bassett's successor, National's Warren Cooper, took the process further. He promoted legislation requiring that the remaining ARC corporatisations take place and transferred ownership of the resulting companies from the ARC to a new short-lived body, the Auckland Regional Services Trust (ARST). The businesses transferred included the shareholding in Ports of Auckland and the Yellow Bus Company. Watercare Services (formed 1992) was one resulting company, the largest local government corporatisation in New Zealand. The Auckland Regional Services Trust was later required to privatise the Yellow Bus Company, which was bought by Stagecoach. The ARC later recovered the Ports of Auckland shareholding when ARST was wound up, and later forcibly purchased the minority shares.

Watercare did not continue ownership of the catchment lands in the Waitakere and Hunua Ranges, taking a lease from the Council of the dam, pipeline and lake areas only. The result was the largest addition to the land in Regional Parks in the ARC's history.

== Auckland Regional Council, 1989–2010 ==
The ARC had an umbrella function covering all the cities and districts of the region, but its regulatory power and funding abilities were restricted to areas such as public transport, environmental protection and regional parks. The ARC was an elected body, and collected its own rates. In 2003 the ARC commenced direct rating and ceased to collect levies through the territorial councils.

The creation of the Auckland Regional Transport Authority (ARTA) followed the return of assets to the Auckland Regional Council in 2004. They picked up on projects initiated by the ARC, territorial local authorities and government agencies such as Transit NZ. These included projects like the Northern Busway, as well as significant rail and public transport investment. Soon after, the Council purchased those shares in private hands Ports of Auckland to fund the improvements with the dividends. In the final period before its subsumation into Auckland Council, the ARC was concentrating on the electrification of the Auckland railway network, building the case for a CBD rail tunnel, and an extension of rail to Auckland Airport.

In its final years, the ARC had been getting more involved in land use regulation, a move which was met with criticism from some politicians of the concerned Councils who normally regulate such matters. This criticism surfaced especially during a short-lived 2006 debate on further integration of the Auckland area, where many of the proposals included a proposed abolishment of the ARC, or a changed, less independent role.

One of the mainstays of the ARC's work was expanding the parks network, which as of 2010 included 26 regional parks with more than 40,000 hectares, including many restored natural habitats and sanctuaries developed in co-operation with the Department of Conservation and volunteers.

Of the rates collected by the ARC, 50% would go to fund public transport via ARTA, which is to amount to NZ$155 million in 2007/2008, up from $124 million in the preceding 2-year period 2006/2007. The ARC also managed regional parks with 400 km^{2} and 150 km of coastline, for which 15% of its total funding is spent. A further 19% was spent on ecological concerns, such as water quality and protecting ecosystems. Other minor percentages funded areas like "built environment" (4%), "safety" (1%), "economic development" (3%) and "regional leadership and community development" (8%).

== Subsidiaries ==
- Auckland Regional Holdings (ARH) – holding entity, owner of Ports of Auckland and other assets
- Auckland Regional Transport Authority (ARTA) – was responsible for planning, funding and developing the Auckland regional land transport system

== Personnel ==
=== Chairs ===
The following have served as chairpersons of ARA or ARC:

	Name	Term		Constituency
1	Dove-Myer Robinson	1963	1965	Auckland City
2	Hugh Lambie	1965	1968	Manukau
3	Tom Pearce	1968	1976†	Auckland City
4	Lee Murdoch	1977	1983	Papatoetoe
5	Fred Thomas	1983	1986	Takapuna
6	Colin Kay	1986	1992	Auckland City
7	Phil Warren	1992	2002†	Auckland City
8	Gwen Bull	2002	2004	Manukau
9	Mike Lee	2004	2010	Auckland City

=== General managers / chief executives ===
- John Steel
- Ted Flynn
- Fergie Schischka – 1972–1979
- Hugh Aimer – 1979–84
- Murray Sargent
- Colin Knox
- George Tyler
- Jo Brosnahan
- Peter Winder

== Legacy ==
The legacy of the Regional Council is primarily in the acceptance by Aucklanders and central government that a single government organisation for Auckland was needed. This resulted in the Auckland Council. The most enduring material things are the former Regional Parks now the dominant part of what the Auckland Council identifies as its Premier and Regional Parks.
