= Stockade Hill =

Park in Auckland, New Zealand

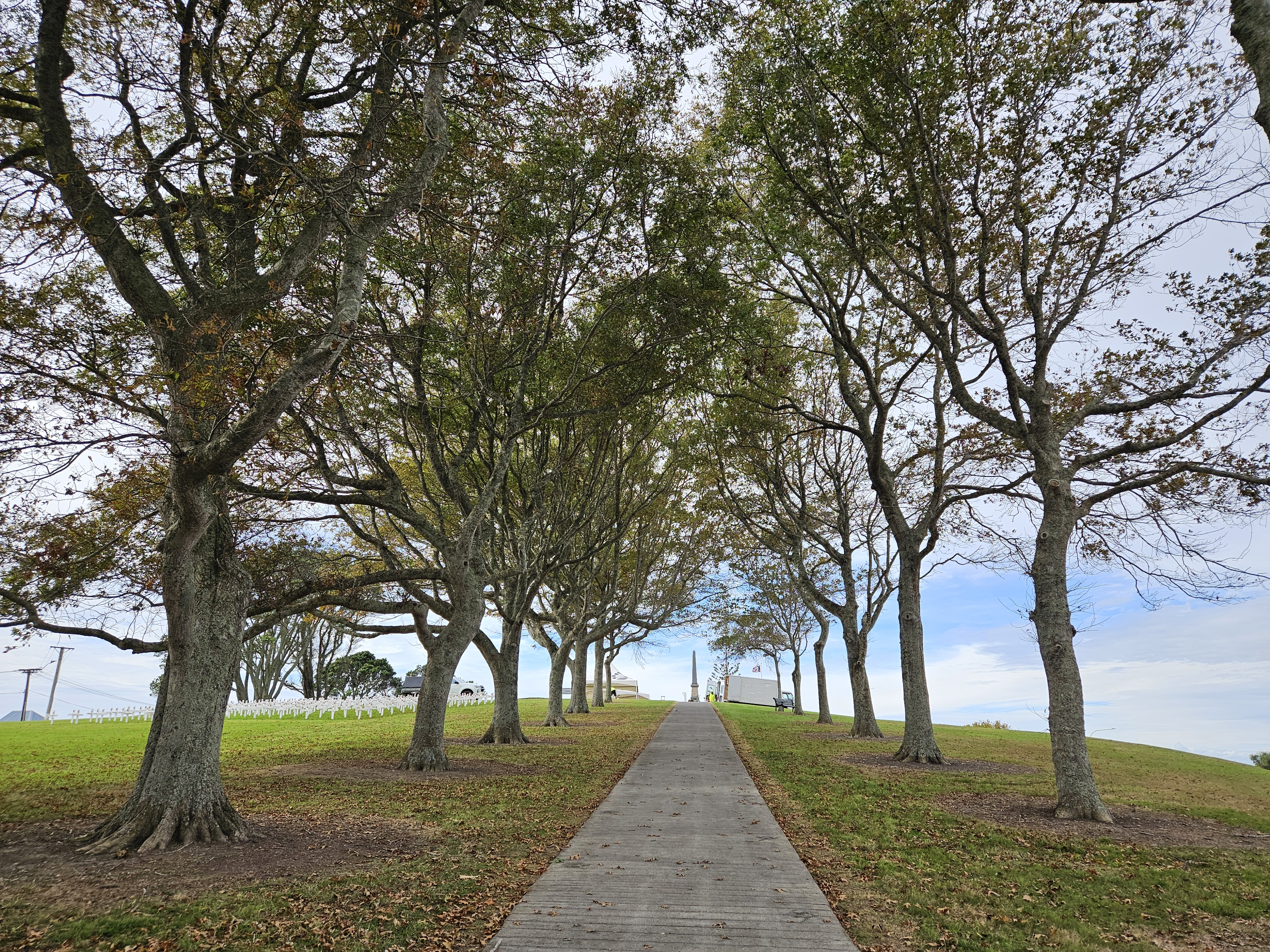
- Interactive map of Stockade Hill
- Type: Public park
- Location: Auckland, New Zealand
- Coordinates: 36.89222°S 174.92784°E
- Operator: Auckland Council
- Status: Open year round

Stockade Hill, Howick was the location of a stockade built by British settlers to defend from indigenous Māori during the British colonisation of New Zealand. It is located on the main road into Howick, New Zealand.

Howick's war memorial is located in the centre of the remains of the stockade's earthworks which are readily visible today.

== History ==
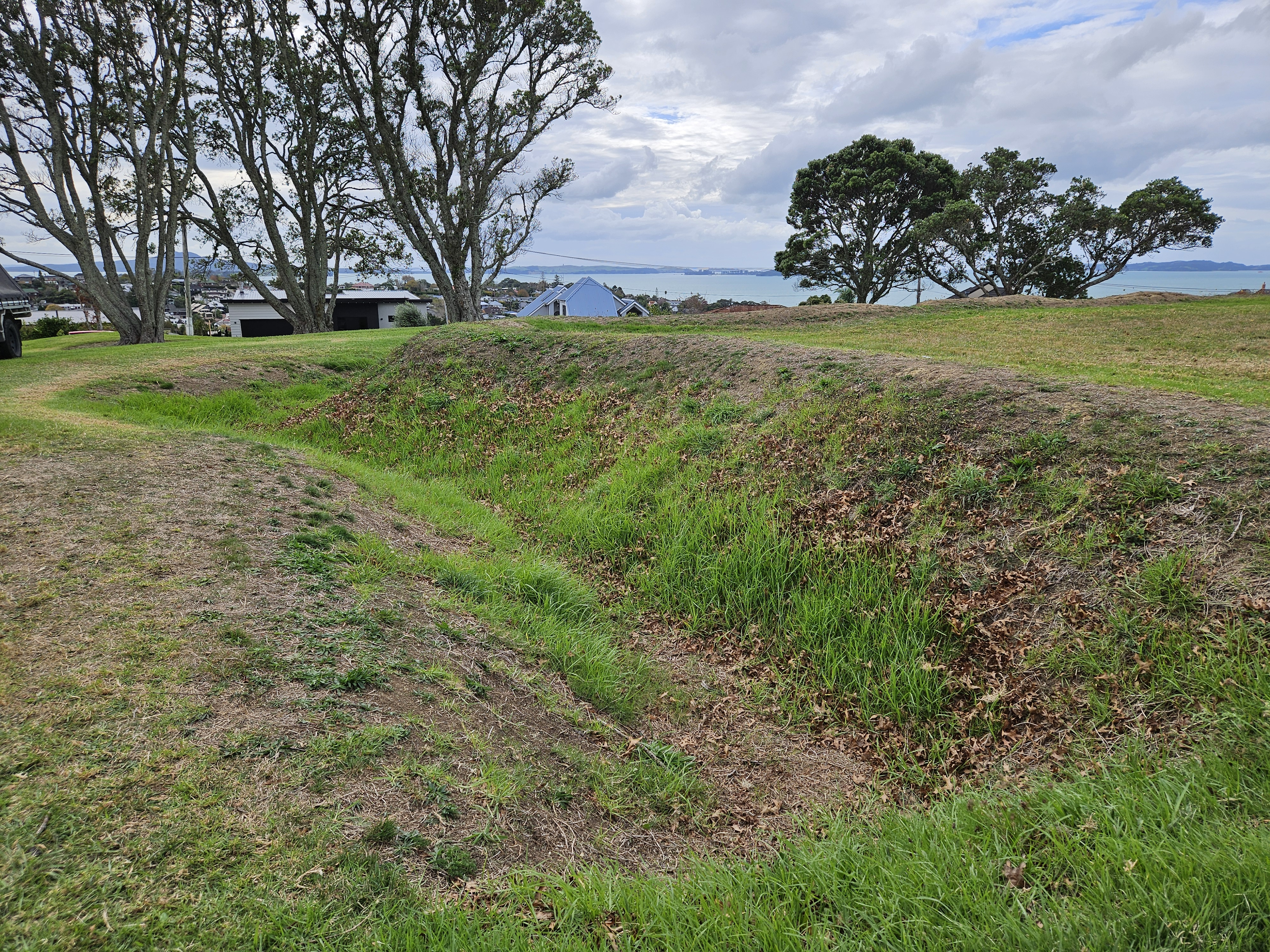
Remnants of the stockade earthworks

The stockade was built in June 1863, for defence of British settlers against the perceived indigenous Maori threat during the New Zealand Land Wars. Howick's first resident vicar, Church of England clergyman Reverend Vicesimus Lush wrote of this in his personal diary.

During the past week we have been in continual alarms and the talk everywhere and with everyone has been about stockades and redoubts and guns and rifles and cavalry and militia: there is, I am sorry to say, a desire on the part of many Europeans to force on a war with the natives, knowing that ultimately the latter must be exterminated and that therefore the quicker will the whole country be opened up for occupation by Europeans.

— Reverend Vicesimus Lush, 1 April 1861 diary record

The site was constructed of loop holed sheets of iron surmounting a ditch and bank, and enclosed barracks for regular troops. The local militia, British Army 70th Regiment and Bavarian mercenaries from Puhoi, camped at the stockade. At one point there were two hundred troops stationed. Women and children slept here at night for several weeks in 1863 when there was fear of attack during the Land Wars.

The war has suddenly left Taranaki and broken out here - close to us. The Village is kept in a state of anxiety every night; there is patrol every night and every man you passed is armed: a stockade has been erected as a refuge for the women and children in case of a sudden attack. The rumours have been so alarming that the Seddons and Peacockes have sent in their children, and last Friday an attack was deemed so imminent that I deemed it necessary to pack off, instantly the news reacht us, Blannie, Anne, Edith, Baby and the servant girl.

— Reverend Vicesimus Lush, 19 July 1863 diary record

Bavarian mercenaries stationed here in 1863 erected a Christmas tree, believed to be the first in New Zealand, and sang carols.

== 21st century ==
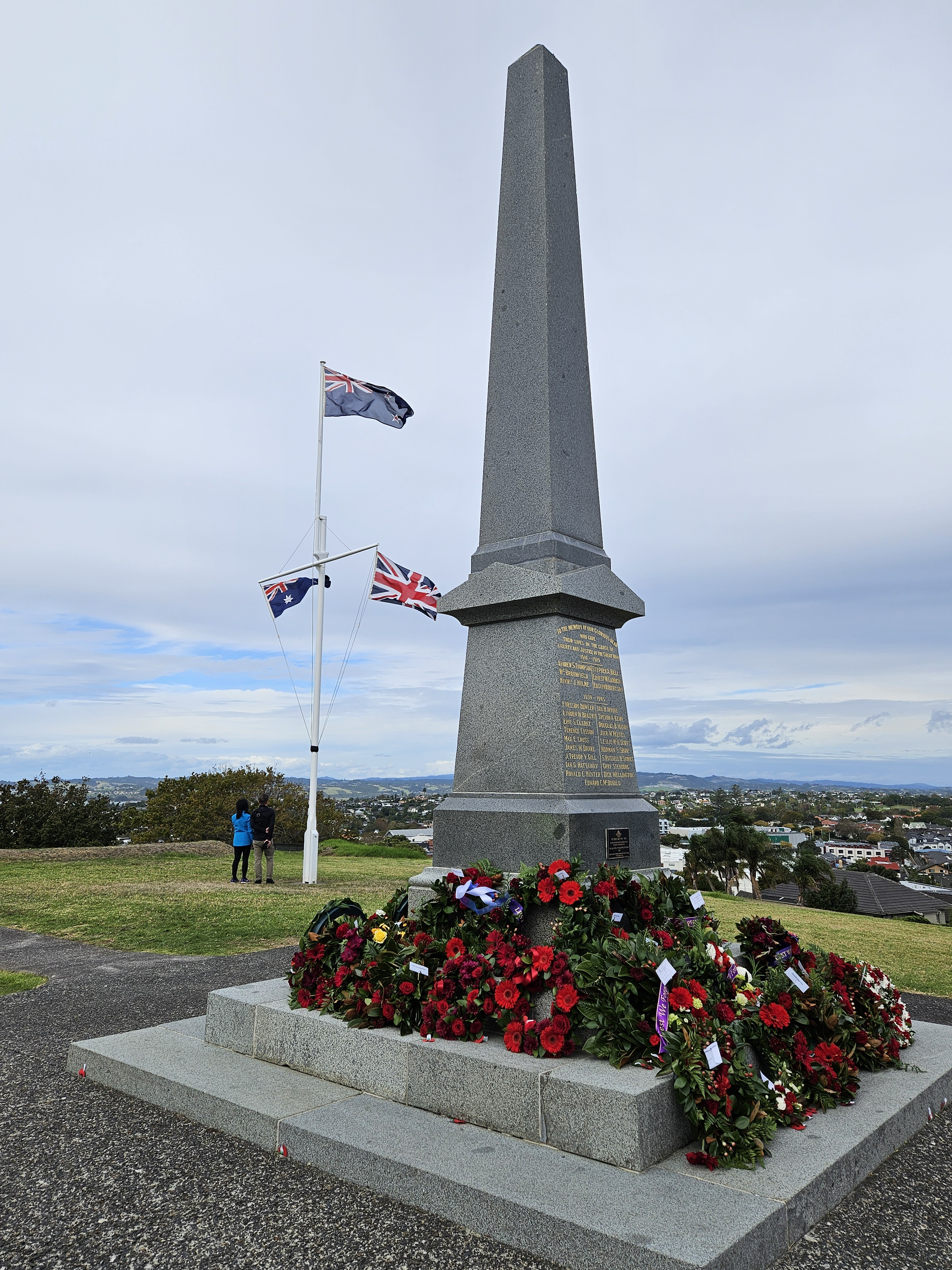
The Howick and Pakuranga First World War memorial

To the south of the hill on the main road can be seen the original concrete road that ran all the way from Howick to Panmure, thus allowing much shorter travel times between Howick and Auckland.

Until recently the hill had two large concrete water tanks providing water to Howick. These have now been removed. Each year the ANZAC Day (25 April) parade ends at the top of the hill, where a service is held.

At the centre of the old stockade, which is now a public park in which the stockade's perimeter earthworks are easily visible, is the Howick War Memorial, which was unveiled on 13 January 1921.
