= Manukau City =

- Territorial authority of New Zealand
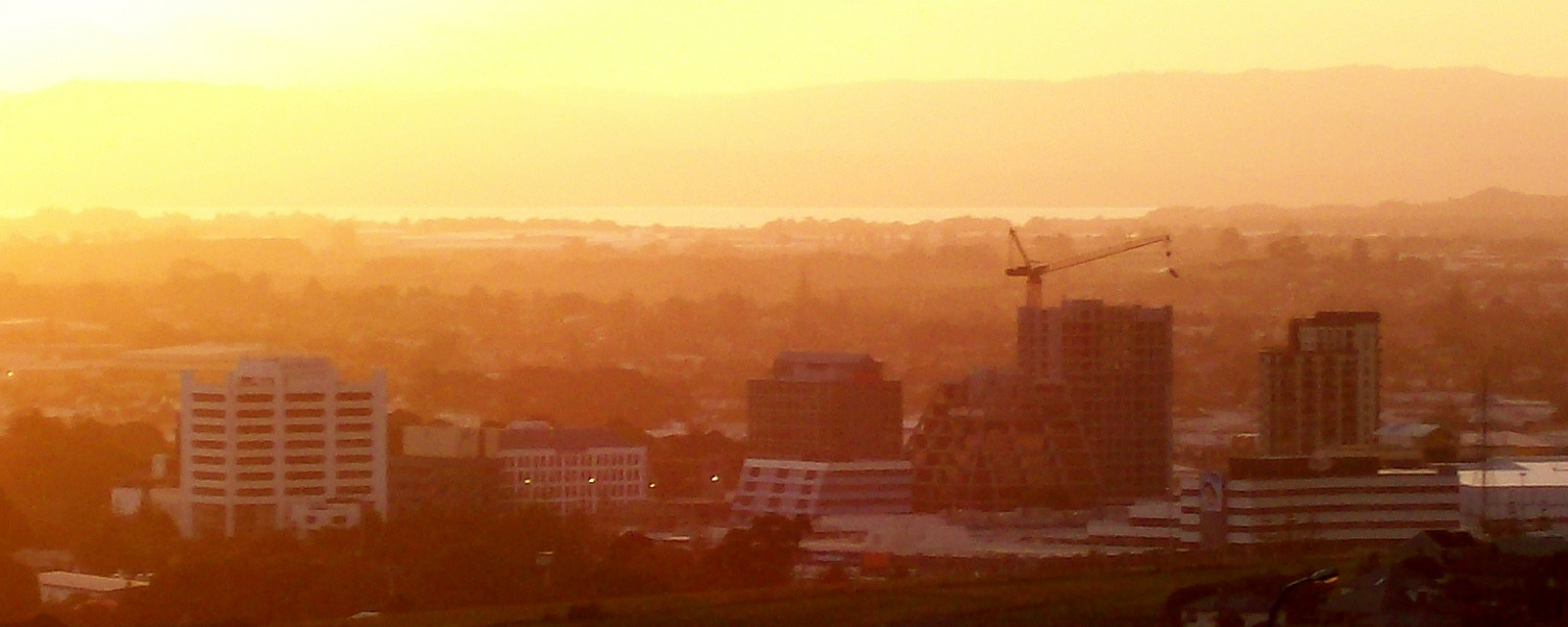
- The Manukau skyline looking northwest.

- Nickname: South Auckland
- Motto: Ante Alios Prosili (Be ahead of the times)
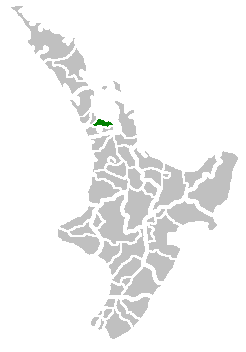
- Manukau City within New Zealand

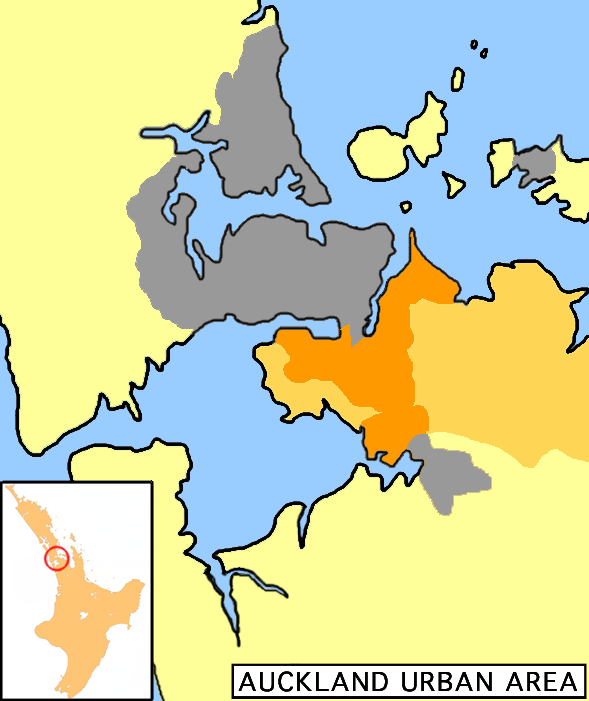
- Manukau City (in orange) within the Auckland metropolitan area. The darker orange indicates the urban area.
- Coordinates: 36°59′S 174°53′E
- Country: New Zealand
- Island: North Island
- Region: Auckland
- Established: 3 September 1965
- Disestablished: 1 November 2010
- Wards: Botany-Clevedon, Howick, Māngere, Manurewa, Otara, Pakuranga, Papatoetoe

Government
  - Mayor: Barry Curtis (1983–2007); Len Brown (2007–2010)

Area
  - Total: 683 km^{2} (264 sq mi)
- Time zone: UTC+12 (NZST)
  - Summer (DST): UTC+13 (NZDT)
- Area code: 09
- Website: manukau.govt.nz

Manukau City was a territorial authority district in Auckland, New Zealand, that was governed by the Manukau City Council. The area is also referred to as "South Auckland", although this term never possessed official recognition and does not encompass areas such as East Auckland, which was within the city boundary. It was a relatively young city, both in terms of legal status and large-scale settlement – though in June 2010, it was the third largest in New Zealand, and the fastest growing. In the same year, the entire Auckland Region was amalgamated under a single city authority, Auckland Council.

The name Manukau, originating from the Manukau Harbour to the west, is of Māori origin, and means "only birds" ("manu kau"), although it has been suggested that the original name of the harbour was Mānuka, meaning a marker post with which an early chief is said to have claimed the area.

In 1965, the name "Manukau" won a public poll of the residents of Manukau County and Manurewa Borough as the new district's name, which the New Zealand Geographic Board approved for "Auckland's new southern city".

== History ==
Manukau City was formed by the amalgamation of Manukau County and Manurewa Borough on 3 September 1965, following a referendum on 10 April. The initial proposal for amalgamation included the boroughs of Otahuhu, Papatoetoe, Howick, and Papakura, but those boroughs were opposed. The council had their offices at the Nathan Estate (now the Auckland Botanic Gardens) until permanent offices were constructed.

Manukau County was reduced in size on 1 April 1912, with the southern portion of the county forming the new Franklin County. In 1923, Manukau County covered 195 mi^{2} (510 km^{2}) and had a population of 6,146, with 163 mi (262 km) of metalled roads, 90 mi (140 km) of unmetalled dirt roads and 115 mi (185 km) of tracks.

== Geography ==
The Manukau City area is concentrated immediately to the south of the Ōtāhuhu isthmus, the narrowest connection between Auckland City and the Northland region and the rest of the North Island. At its narrowest, between the Otahuhu Creek arm of the Tamaki River (itself an estuarial arm of the Hauraki Gulf) in the east and the Māngere Inlet (an arm of the Manukau Harbour) to the west, the isthmus is only some 1500 metres across.

The area to the south of the isthmus contains the heart of Manukau, sprawled on either side of state highways 1 and 20, the latter of which approaches from the west after crossing Māngere Bridge. The area known as Manukau Central is located close to the junction of these two highways, some 20 kilometres southeast of the centre of Auckland city.

Considerable rural and semi-rural land to the east of Manukau Central was within the city council district. This extended towards the Hunua Ranges close to the Firth of Thames, and took in such communities as Clevedon and Maraetai.

Beyond Manukau City to the south is Papakura and the Franklin District, which are less urban, but still part of the Auckland Region, and to some extent regarded as an integral part of Auckland's urban area.

Auckland Airport is located in Māngere, in the west of Manukau, close to the waters of the Manukau Harbour. Manukau City includes the theme park Rainbow's End, and one of the oldest shopping malls in the country, now called Westfield Manukau City.

== Transport ==
In 2009, work started on the Manukau Branch passenger railway line from the North Island Main Trunk at Puhinui. The branch line opened on 15 April 2012 with Manukau railway station as the terminus for Eastern Line services. The Manukau Institute of Technology university campus building is built over the top of the station, which serves the Manukau city centre. On 7 April 2018, a 23-bay bus station (Manukau bus station) was opened on a lot adjacent to the train station to create a transport hub serving most of the southern Auckland Region.

== Population ==
As of the late 2000s, slightly less than 50% of the city's population identified as European, with 17% as Māori, 27% as Pacific, and 15% as Asian, with the balance made up of other groups.

== Administrative divisions ==
Prior to merging into Auckland Council in November 2010, Manukau City was divided into seven wards, which consisted of the following populated places (i.e. suburbs, towns, localities, settlements, communities, hamlets, etc.)

=== Currently in Manurewa and Manukau Wards (post-2010) ===
- Manurewa Ward
  - Manurewa
  - Manurewa East
  - Clendon Park
  - Wiri
  - Manukau (Note: Otherwise known as Manukau Central or Manukau CBD.)
  - Manukau Heights
  - Weymouth
  - Waimahia Landing
  - Wattle Cove
  - Wattle Downs
  - Silkwood Heights
  - The Gardens
  - Totara Heights
  - Randwick Park
  - Redoubt Park
  - Heron Point
  - Murphy's Heights
  - Mahia Park
  - Hill Park
  - Goodwood Heights
  - Porchester Park
  - Settlers Cove
  - Greenmeadows
- Māngere Ward
  - Māngere East
  - Favona
  - Māngere Bridge
  - Māngere
  - Airport Oaks
  - Ihumatao
- Papatoetoe Ward
  - Papatoetoe
  - Puhinui
  - Middlemore
- Otara Ward
  - Ōtara
  - Clover Park
  - Chapel Downs
  - East Tāmaki (south portion)
  - Flat Bush (west portion)

=== Currently in Howick Ward (post-2010) ===
- Pakuranga Ward
  - Bucklands Beach
  - Eastern Beach
  - Half Moon Bay
  - Farm Cove, New Zealand
  - Sunnyhill
  - Pakuranga
  - Pakuranga Heights
- Howick Ward
  - Mellons Bay
  - Howick
  - Cockle Bay
  - Highland Park
  - Botany Downs
  - Somerville
  - Shelly Park
  - Meadowlands
- Botany-Clevedon Ward
  - Botany Community Board
    - East Tāmaki (north portion)
    - Flat Bush (east portion)
    - Burswood
    - Golflands
    - Hungtingdon Park
    - North Park
    - Shamrock Park
    - Dannemora
    - East Tāmaki Heights
    - Botany
    - Greenmount
    - Ormiston
    - Mission Heights
    - Regis Park
    - Tuscany Estates
    - Donegal Park
    - Fairborn
    - Bremner Ridge
    - Donegal Glen
    - Vista Estate
    - Baverstock
    - Hilltop
    - Tuscany Heights
    - Botany Junction
  - Clevedon Community Board
    - Whitford
    - Brookby
    - Beachlands
    - Maraetai
    - Clevedon
    - Kawakawa Bay
    - Orere Point
    - Ardmore (partially)
    - Alfriston (partially)

== Prominent people ==
- Len Brown, former Mayor, and former Mayor of Auckland
- Jim Anderton, former city councillor, who rose to be the country's Deputy Prime Minister
- Sir Barry Curtis, former long-serving Mayor, from 1983 to 2007
- David Lange, former Prime Minister of New Zealand and Member of Parliament for Māngere
- Award-winning rapper and former member of The Deceptikonz, Savage

== Local government ==
The Manukau City Council was the elected local authority of the city from 1965 until November 2010 when the Auckland Council was created.

Manukau City had an elected Youth Council which primarily acted as an advisory committee and advocate for youth in the city.

=== Coat of arms ===
Coat of arms of Manukau City
Notes Manukau City had a coat of arms, granted in 1968. The blazon is: Crest On a Wreath Or and Gules perched on battlements of a Tower proper in front of an aeroplane propeller Or a Seagull wings elevated proper. Escutcheon Azure on a Chevron Or between in chief two Seagulls volant and respectant proper in base a Lymphad sail set pennon and flags flying Or a Bull's head caboshed Sable armed proper between two Cogwheels Sable. Motto Ante Alios Prosili (Be ahead of the times)

== Sister city ==
- Utsunomiya, Tochigi, Japan
