= Clover Park, New Zealand =

Clover Park
- Suburb
- Interactive map of Clover Park
- Coordinates: 36.9851°S 174.8937°E
- Country: New Zealand
- City: Auckland
- Local authority: Auckland Council
- Electoral ward: Manukau ward
- Local board: Ōtara-Papatoetoe Local Board

Area
  - Land: 211 ha (520 acres)

Population (June 2025)
  - Total: 9,440
  - Density: 4,470/km^{2} (11,600/sq mi)

Papatoetoe	Ōtara, Flat Bush	Flat Bush
Manukau Central	Clover Park	Chapel Downs, Manukau Heights
Wiri	Hillpark, Manurewa	Goodwood Heights, Totara Heights

Clover Park is a suburb of Auckland, New Zealand. It is governed by the Auckland Council, and is in the Manukau ward, one of the thirteen administrative divisions of Auckland city.

== Demographics ==
Clover Park covers 2.11 km^{2} (0.81 sq mi) and had an estimated population of 9,440 as of June 2025, with a population density of 4,474 people per km^{2}.

Historical population
Year	Pop.	±% p.a.
2006	8,064	—
2013	7,938	−0.22%
2018	8,925	+2.37%
2023	8,595	−0.75%

Clover Park had a population of 8,595 in the 2023 New Zealand census, a decrease of 330 people (−3.7%) since the 2018 census, and an increase of 657 people (8.3%) since the 2013 census. There were 4,260 males, 4,314 females and 21 people of other genders in 2,043 dwellings. 1.6% of people identified as LGBTIQ+. The median age was 30.2 years (compared with 38.1 years nationally). There were 2,205 people (25.7%) aged under 15 years, 2,061 (24.0%) aged 15 to 29, 3,513 (40.9%) aged 30 to 64, and 816 (9.5%) aged 65 or older.

People could identify as more than one ethnicity. The results were 13.9% European (Pākehā); 17.5% Māori; 56.7% Pasifika; 29.2% Asian; 1.0% Middle Eastern, Latin American and African New Zealanders (MELAA); and 0.9% other, which includes people giving their ethnicity as "New Zealander". English was spoken by 88.1%, Māori language by 4.1%, Samoan by 20.3%, and other languages by 25.9%. No language could be spoken by 3.1% (e.g. too young to talk). New Zealand Sign Language was known by 0.3%. The percentage of people born overseas was 42.0, compared with 28.8% nationally.

Religious affiliations were 50.8% Christian, 6.9% Hindu, 3.4% Islam, 1.3% Māori religious beliefs, 3.9% Buddhist, 0.1% New Age, and 2.4% other religions. People who answered that they had no religion were 24.4%, and 7.3% of people did not answer the census question.

Of those at least 15 years old, 711 (11.1%) people had a bachelor's or higher degree, 3,138 (49.1%) had a post-high school certificate or diploma, and 2,541 (39.8%) people exclusively held high school qualifications. The median income was $35,600, compared with $41,500 nationally. 240 people (3.8%) earned over $100,000 compared to 12.1% nationally. The employment status of those at least 15 was that 3,147 (49.2%) people were employed full-time, 579 (9.1%) were part-time, and 354 (5.5%) were unemployed.

Individual statistical areas
Name	Area (km^{2})	Population	Density (per km^{2})	Dwellings	Median age	Median income
Clover Park North	0.84	2,799	3,332	612	28.3 years	$34,400
Clover Park East	0.52	2,589	4,979	591	29.8 years	$34,500
Clover Park South	0.74	3,210	4,338	843	32.1 years	$37,500
New Zealand					38.1 years	$41,500

== Education ==
Redoubt North School is a full primary (years 1–8) school with a roll of 545.

Kia Aroha College is a secondary school (years 7–13) school with a roll of 360. Some classes are taught in the Māori language and some in Pacific languages. It was formed in January 2011 when Clover Park Middle School merged with Te Whānau o Tupuranga.

== Amenities ==
The Manukau Sports Bowl, a 21.6-hectare (53-acre) park, is located in Clover Park, immediately to the east of the Auckland Southern Motorway. Originally farmland, the land for the park was acquired in the 1960s and 1970s. By the early 1980s, the site included two sports fields. Substantial development took place between 1987 and 1989 with the construction of a greyhound track and a velodrome. Today, facilities in the park include the Auckland Greyhound Track, the Manukau Velodrome, a function centre, a tennis centre, various sports fields, a children's playground, bocce courts and a basketball court.

Since 1996, the Manukau Sports Bowl has been the venue for the annual Polyfest, the world's largest Pacific dance festival, attracting up to 100,000 visitors.

== Manukau Velodrome ==
The Manukau Velodrome was developed by the Manukau City Council at an estimated cost of $4,349,000, following a report setting out the requirement for a velodrome to host track cycling at the 1990 Commonwealth Games. The facility was jointly paid for by the Manukau City Council and the government's Games Enhancement Fund, each providing 25 per cent of the funding, and the Auckland Regional Authority. It opened on 16 September 1989, and hosted the track cycling at the Auckland Commonwealth Games the following January.

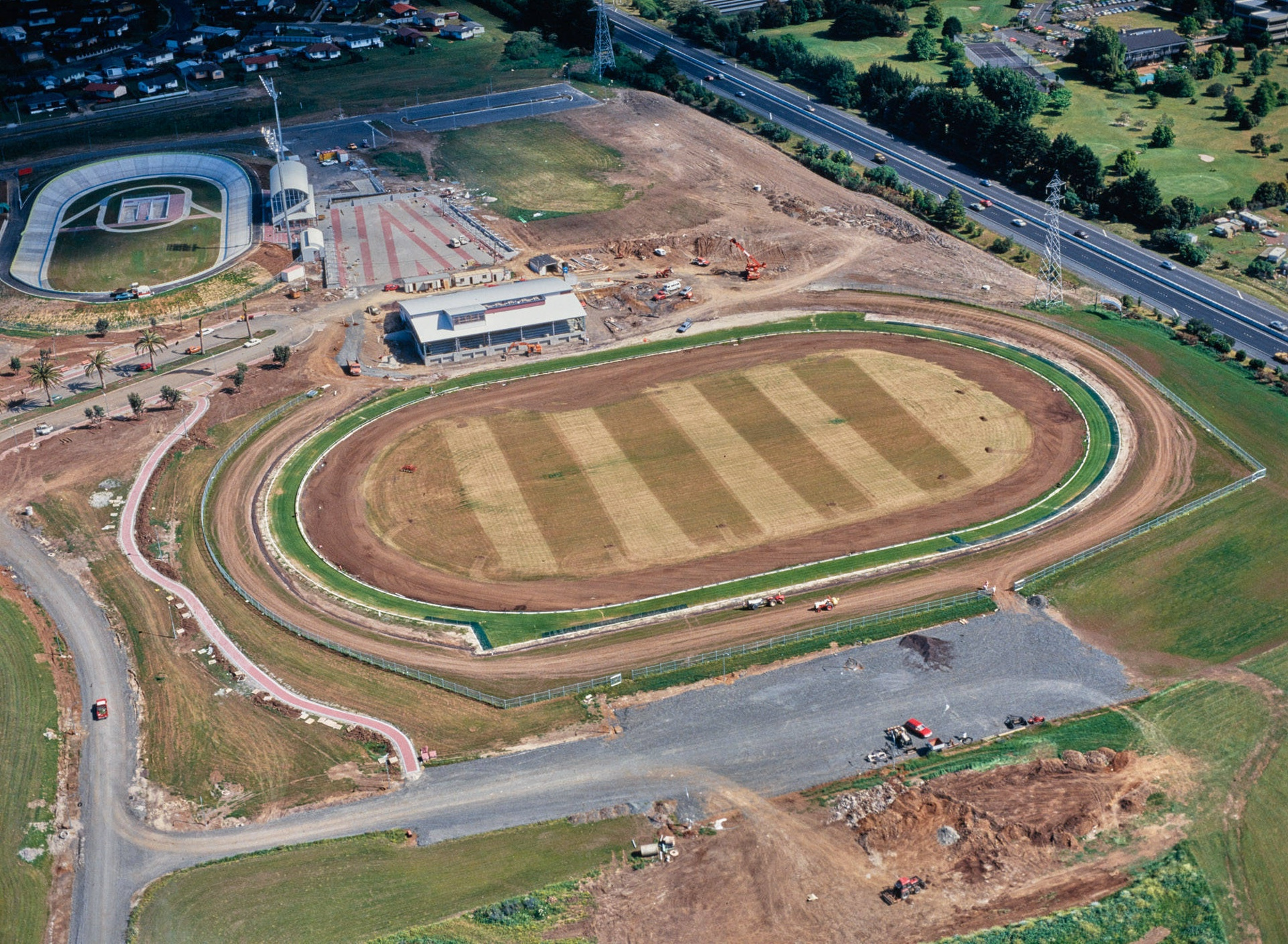
Manukau Velodrome (top left) and Auckland Greyhound Track (centre), c. 1989, adjacent to the Southern Motorway

During the 2003 World Rally Championship, the velodrome formed part of the course and was the finishing venue for the 2003 Rally New Zealand.

== Auckland Greyhound Track ==
The Auckland Greyhound Track is home to the Auckland Greyhound Racing Club. The track was developed at a cost of $3.2 million, and held its first race meeting on 18 December 1989. In late 2023, the Ōtara-Papatoetoe Local Board announced that the greyhound track would be replaced by an athletics track, and that negotiations were taking place between the Auckland Greyhound Racing Club and Auckland Council to facilitate the club's move away from the Manukau Sports Bowl.
