= Goodwood Heights =

- Suburb
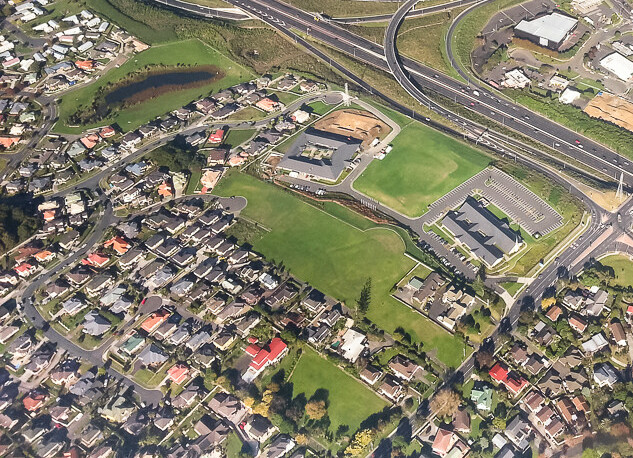
- Northern Goodwood Heights with the Auckland Southern Motorway in the background
- Interactive map of Goodwood Heights
- Coordinates: 36.9939°S 174.8994°E
- Country: New Zealand
- City: Auckland
- Local authority: Auckland Council
- Electoral ward: Manurewa-Papakura ward
- Local board: Manurewa Local Board

Area
  - Land: 128 ha (320 acres)

Population (June 2025)
  - Total: 4,860
  - Density: 3,800/km^{2} (9,830/sq mi)

| Papatoetoe | Clover Park | Flat Bush |
| Manukau | Goodwood Heights | Totara Park |
| Wiri | Totara Heights | The Gardens |

Goodwood Heights is a suburb of Auckland, New Zealand. It is located approximately 20 kilometres southeast of the Auckland CBD; to the north of Totara Heights, east of Manukau Central and south of Chapel Downs. It was formerly part of Manukau City until the merger of all of Auckland's councils into the 'super city' in 2010.

Goodwood Heights is the location of St Johns Redoubt, a military camp established in 1863 during the Invasion of the Waikato. The suburb developed in the late 1970s, with Everglade Primary School established in the suburb in 1988. In 2020, construction began on Auckland New Zealand Temple, the second The Church of Jesus Christ of Latter-day Saints temple to be constructed in New Zealand. The temple was dedicated in April 2025 by Patrick Kearon of the Quorum of the Twelve Apostles.

== Geography ==
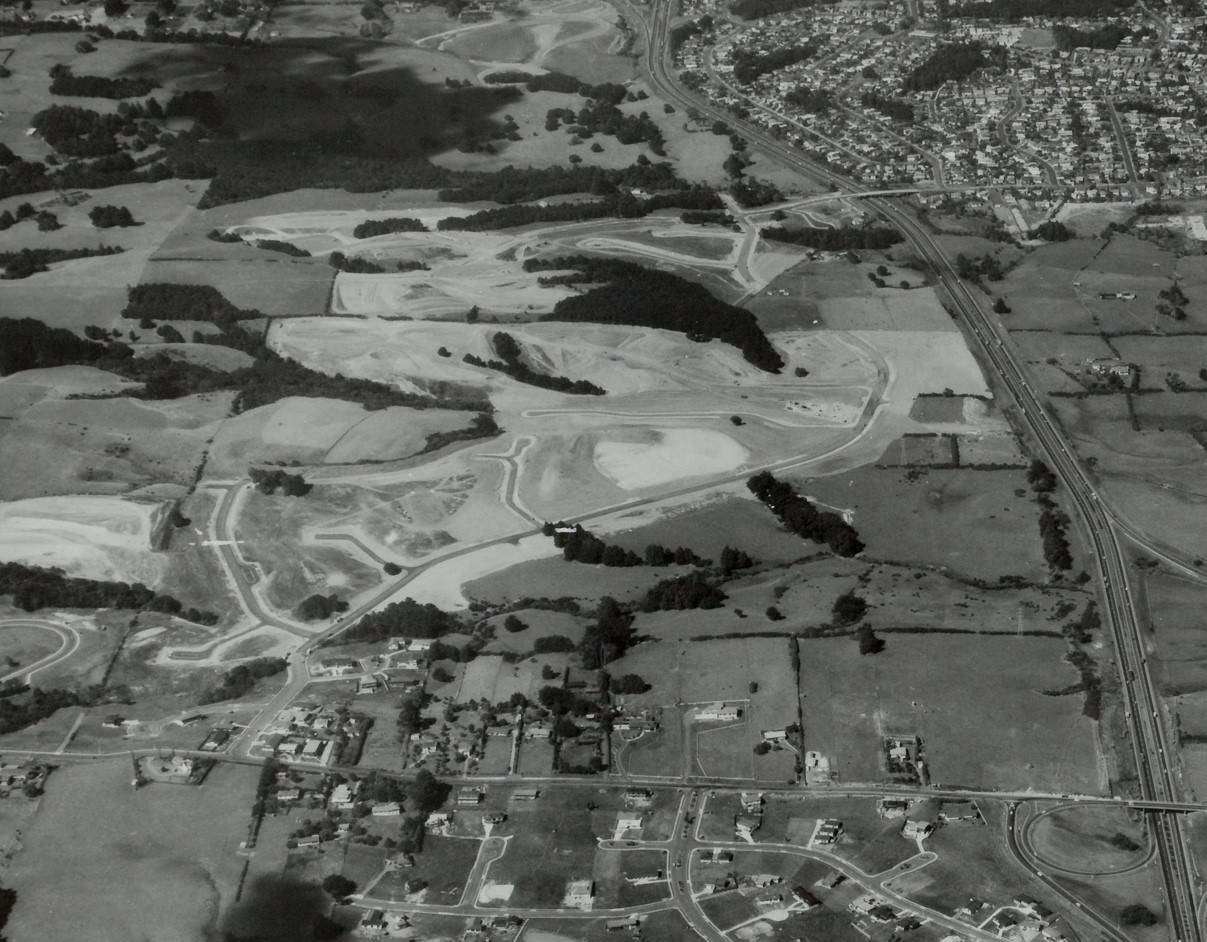
Aerial view of Goodwood Heights in 1978 during the initial stages of suburb construction

Goodwood Heights is located near Manukau Central, east of the Auckland Southern Motorway and north of Totara Heights. It is located on a hilly area adjacent to Manukau Central. Redoubt Road, Goodwood Drive and Everglade Road are major roads that run through the suburb.

Many streets in Goodwood Heights were named after ornamental tree species. Some streets in the development are named after aircraft or aircraft manufacturers, due to their location on the flight path of planes arriving at Auckland Airport.

== History ==
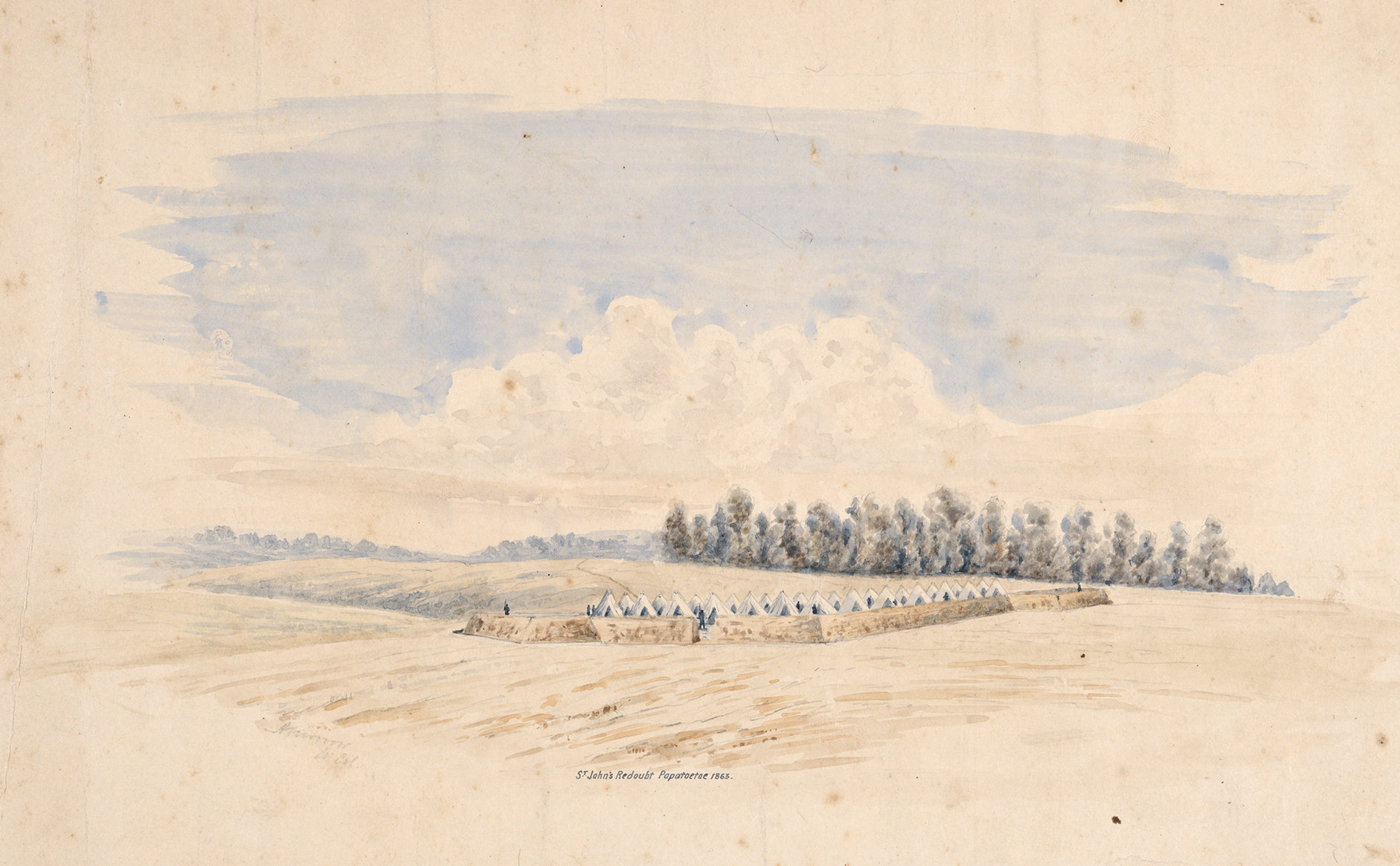
Watercolour of St John's Redoubt in 1863

On 21 July 1863 during the Invasion of the Waikato, St John's Redoubt was constructed in modern-day Goodwood Heights. Constructed in order to secure the supply line for troops along Great South Road, the redoubt never saw active engagement, and by the following year troops were withdrawn from the redoubt. In 1960, the site of the redoubt became a historic reserve.

The first suburban housing developments along Redoubt Road began from 1952, when farmer Cameron Matthews began selling 2 acres (0.81 ha) lots adjacent to Redoubt Road. Dairy farmers Ransom and Ann Smyth began subdividing the Redoubt Road adjacent parts of their property in 1972. In 1975, the Manukau City Council began developing Manurewa East, a wide greenfields development to the east of Manurewa, an area that later developed into the suburbs of Goodwood Heights, Totara Heights, The Gardens and Randwick Park.

The name Goodwood Heights was first used as a name for an AGH Developments-constructed subdivision adjacent to Totara Park, which the company began work on shortly after completing work on the Totara Heights subdivision. The origin of the name is not known. The first subdivisions in Goodwood Heights were advertised for sale in April 1979. In 1979, the Smyth family developed an area called Redoubt Park, in the vicinity of Everglade Drive. During construction, both Goodwood Heights and Totara Heights preserved significantly more mature native bush relative to other suburban developments in South Auckland at the time. By 1981, a Housing New Zealand housing project was developed in the area. Over time, Goodwood Heights was adopted as a name to refer to the wider area.

By 1984, Everglade Drive was extended south towards Totara Heights; the first time a road link was constructed between the two suburbs. Everglade Primary School was established in the suburb on 2 February 1988.

Auckland New Zealand Temple, the second temple of The Church of Jesus Christ of Latter-day Saints in New Zealand, began construction in the suburb in June 2020.

== Demographics ==
Goodwood Heights covers 1.28 km^{2} (0.49 sq mi) and had an estimated population of 4,860 as of June 2025, with a population density of 3,797 people per km^{2}.

Historical population
| Year | Pop. | ±% p.a. |
|---|---|---|
| 2006 | 3,834 | — |
| 2013 | 4,071 | +0.86% |
| 2018 | 4,401 | +1.57% |
| 2023 | 4,344 | −0.26% |

Goodwood Heights had a population of 4,344 in the 2023 New Zealand census, a decrease of 57 people (−1.3%) since the 2018 census, and an increase of 273 people (6.7%) since the 2013 census. There were 2,184 males, 2,145 females and 15 people of other genders in 1,191 dwellings. 2.3% of people identified as LGBTIQ+. The median age was 35.4 years (compared with 38.1 years nationally). There were 759 people (17.5%) aged under 15 years, 1,005 (23.1%) aged 15 to 29, 2,013 (46.3%) aged 30 to 64, and 567 (13.1%) aged 65 or older.

People could identify as more than one ethnicity. The results were 21.9% European (Pākehā); 10.6% Māori; 23.9% Pasifika; 53.1% Asian; 2.4% Middle Eastern, Latin American and African New Zealanders (MELAA); and 1.5% other, which includes people giving their ethnicity as "New Zealander". English was spoken by 89.5%, Māori language by 2.2%, Samoan by 7.9%, and other languages by 40.4%. No language could be spoken by 2.8% (e.g. too young to talk). New Zealand Sign Language was known by 0.3%. The percentage of people born overseas was 53.0, compared with 28.8% nationally.

Religious affiliations were 33.8% Christian, 18.1% Hindu, 5.2% Islam, 0.9% Māori religious beliefs, 3.2% Buddhist, 0.1% New Age, and 7.5% other religions. People who answered that they had no religion were 26.2%, and 5.1% of people did not answer the census question.

Of those at least 15 years old, 861 (24.0%) people had a bachelor's or higher degree, 1,623 (45.3%) had a post-high school certificate or diploma, and 1,101 (30.7%) people exclusively held high school qualifications. The median income was $44,400, compared with $41,500 nationally. 342 people (9.5%) earned over $100,000 compared to 12.1% nationally. The employment status of those at least 15 was that 1,986 (55.4%) people were employed full-time, 351 (9.8%) were part-time, and 126 (3.5%) were unemployed.

Individual statistical areas
| Name | Area (km^{2}) | Population | Density (per km^{2}) | Dwellings | Median age | Median income |
|---|---|---|---|---|---|---|
| Goodwood Heights West | 0.53 | 1,710 | 3,226 | 459 | 33.1 years | $41,100 |
| Goodwood Heights East | 0.75 | 2,634 | 3,512 | 729 | 36.7 years | $46,700 |
| New Zealand | | | | | 38.1 years | $41,500 |

== Education ==
Everglade School is a coeducational contributing primary school (years 1–6) with a roll of 501 as of July 2025.

== Local government ==
Goodwood Heights was originally a part of Manukau City when the suburb was first established in the late 1970s. In November 2010, all cities and districts of the Auckland Region were amalgamated into a single body, governed by the Auckland Council.

Goodwood Heights is a part of the Manurewa local board area. The residents of Manurewa elect a local board, and two councillors from the Manurewa-Papakura ward to sit on the Auckland Council.

== Amenities ==
- Aronia Park is located in Goodwood Heights, and features a rainbow-coloured playground.
- St Johns Redoubt Historic Reserve. Established in 1960 at the site of the former St Johns Redoubt, the reserve became a historic reserve in 2000. In 2021, Te Ākitai Waiohua gifted a Māori language name for the reserve, Tū-ngā-waka ("Standing Canoes"), a name chosen to evoke the deaths of those who died during the New Zealand Wars.

== Bibliography ==
- Ringer, Bruce (2021). Naming Manurewa: Place and Street Names in Manurewa, Weymouth and Wiri. Manurewa Historical Society. ISBN 978-0-473-59363-6.
