= The Gardens, New Zealand =

The Gardens may refer to the following two places in New Zealand:

- The Gardens, Auckland, a suburb of Manukau
- The Gardens, Otago, a suburb of Dunedin
