= Homai =

- Suburb
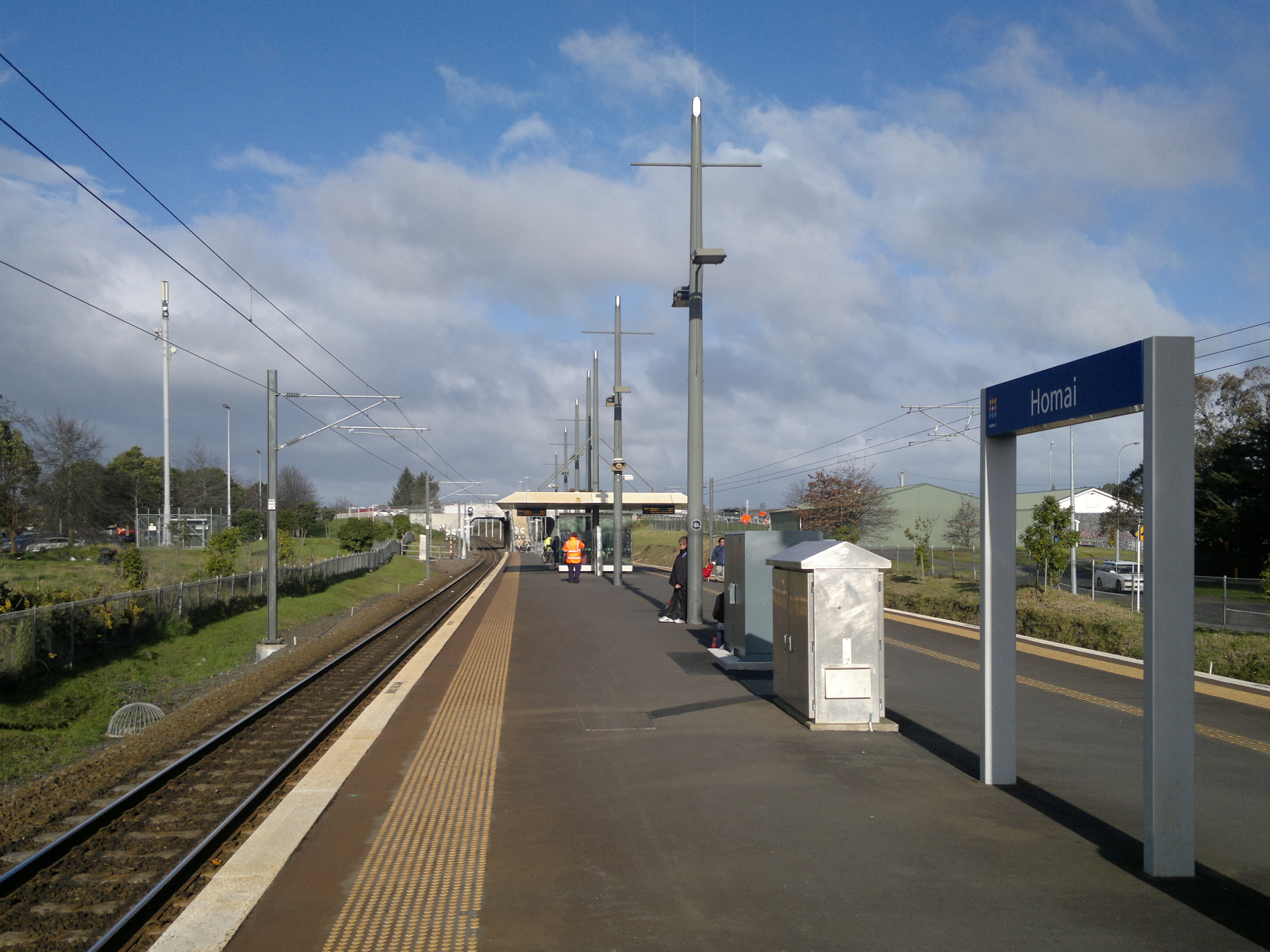
- Homai Railway Station
- Interactive map of Homai
- Coordinates: 37°01′S 174°53′E
- Country: New Zealand
- City: Auckland
- Local authority: Auckland Council
- Electoral ward: Manurewa-Papakura ward
- Local board: Manurewa Local Board

Area
  - Land: 227 ha (560 acres)

Population (June 2025)
  - Total: 14,430
  - Density: 6,360/km^{2} (16,500/sq mi)
- Train stations: Homai Train Station

| Wiri | Manukau Central |
| | Homai | Hillpark |
| Clendon Park | | Manurewa |

Homai is a suburb of Auckland in New Zealand surrounded by Manukau Central, Wiri, Hillpark, Clendon Park and Manurewa. It was formerly under the local governance of the Manukau City Council. It has since been integrated with the rest of Auckland under Auckland Council in 2010.

== History ==
In the early 1920s, local residents of Manurewa, including John Dreadon, lobbied the Manurewa Town Board for the creation of a second train station in the area, which opened in 1924. The train station was named Homai, suggested by Auckland resident Maurice Harding, referring to the gift of land and financing that Dreadon and his neighbours gave to create the station. Over time, the name became associated with the suburban area close to the train station. "Homai" is a Māori language verb, meaning "to give (to me)".

== Demographics ==
Homai covers 2.27 km^{2} (0.88 sq mi) and had an estimated population of 14,430 as of June 2025, with a population density of 6,357 people per km^{2}.

Historical population
| Year | Pop. | ±% p.a. |
|---|---|---|
| 2006 | 9,438 | — |
| 2013 | 9,885 | +0.66% |
| 2018 | 11,931 | +3.83% |
| 2023 | 12,444 | +0.85% |

Homai had a population of 12,444 in the 2023 New Zealand census, an increase of 513 people (4.3%) since the 2018 census, and an increase of 2,559 people (25.9%) since the 2013 census. There were 6,228 males, 6,180 females and 36 people of other genders in 3,054 dwellings. 2.1% of people identified as LGBTIQ+. There were 3,288 people (26.4%) aged under 15 years, 3,291 (26.4%) aged 15 to 29, 5,088 (40.9%) aged 30 to 64, and 780 (6.3%) aged 65 or older.

People could identify as more than one ethnicity. The results were 16.9% European (Pākehā); 26.4% Māori; 48.8% Pasifika; 25.2% Asian; 1.9% Middle Eastern, Latin American and African New Zealanders (MELAA); and 0.8% other, which includes people giving their ethnicity as "New Zealander". English was spoken by 89.8%, Māori language by 6.5%, Samoan by 17.1%, and other languages by 23.2%. No language could be spoken by 3.3% (e.g. too young to talk). New Zealand Sign Language was known by 0.3%. The percentage of people born overseas was 39.3, compared with 28.8% nationally.

Religious affiliations were 48.8% Christian, 8.1% Hindu, 2.9% Islam, 2.5% Māori religious beliefs, 1.6% Buddhist, 0.2% New Age, and 4.0% other religions. People who answered that they had no religion were 25.7%, and 6.4% of people did not answer the census question.

Of those at least 15 years old, 1,017 (11.1%) people had a bachelor's or higher degree, 4,377 (47.8%) had a post-high school certificate or diploma, and 3,750 (41.0%) people exclusively held high school qualifications. 306 people (3.3%) earned over $100,000 compared to 12.1% nationally. The employment status of those at least 15 was that 4,569 (49.9%) people were employed full-time, 801 (8.7%) were part-time, and 564 (6.2%) were unemployed.

Individual statistical areas
| Name | Area (km^{2}) | Population | Density (per km^{2}) | Dwellings | Median age | Median income |
|---|---|---|---|---|---|---|
| Burbank | 0.65 | 3,750 | 5,769 | 804 | 27.1 years | $31,000 |
| Homai East | 0.60 | 2,985 | 4,975 | 807 | 30.6 years | $38,500 |
| Homai West | 0.48 | 2,589 | 5,394 | 603 | 27.5 years | $33,300 |
| Homai Central | 0.54 | 3,120 | 5,778 | 840 | 28.4 years | $36,600 |
| New Zealand | | | | | 38.1 years | $41,500 |

== Education ==
Manurewa High School is a secondary school (years 9–13) with a roll of 2270. The school opened in 1960. Homai School is a contributing primary school (years 1–6) with a roll of 395, which opened in 1955 as Manurewa North School.

Both schools are coeducational. Rolls are as of July 2025.
