= Hillpark, Auckland =

Suburb of Auckland, New Zealand

Hillpark
- Suburb
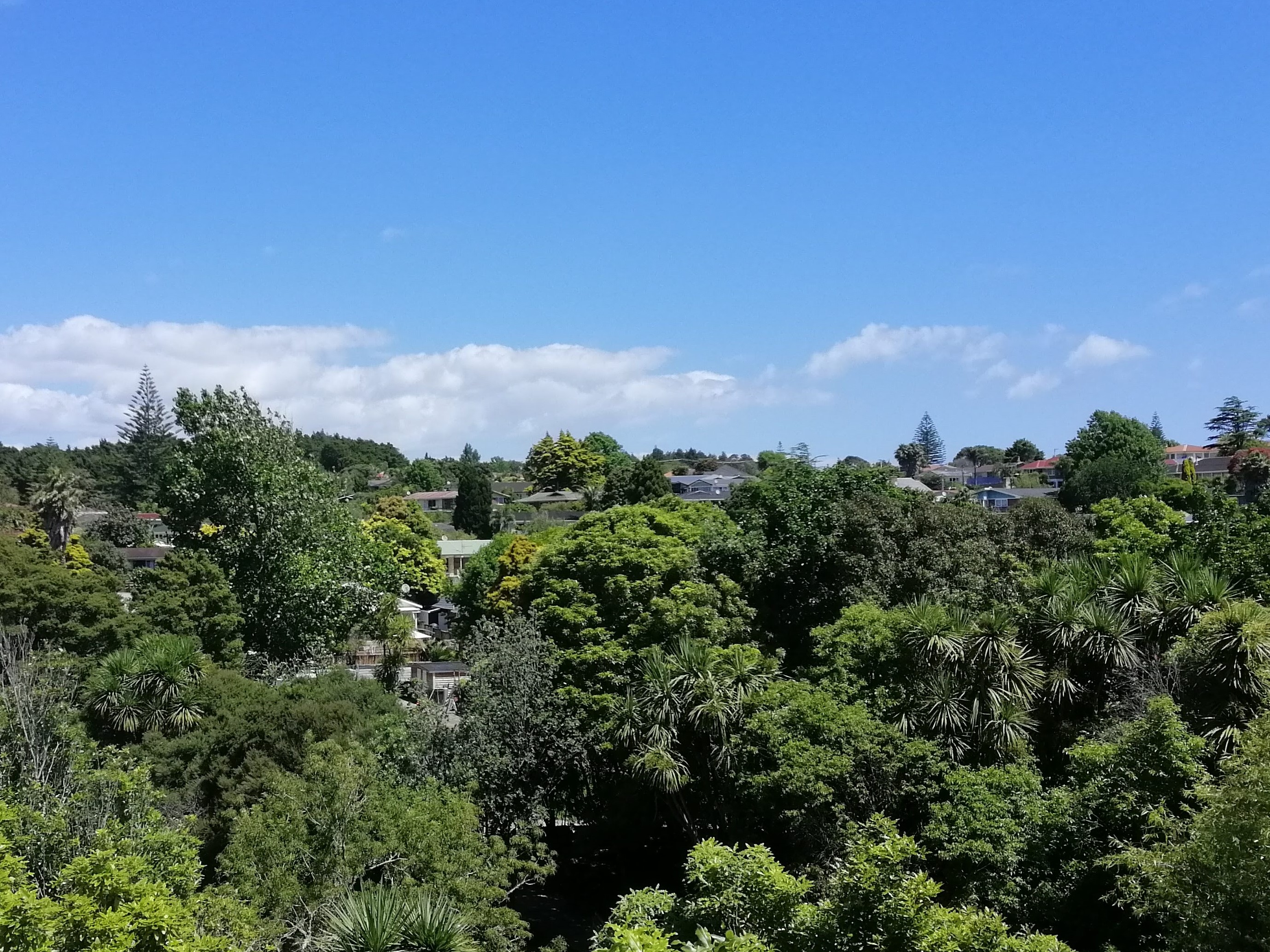
- View over Hillpark suburb from Orams Road motorway overbridge
- Interactive map of Hillpark
- Coordinates: 37°01′00″S 174°54′07″E
- Country: New Zealand
- City: Auckland
- Local authority: Auckland Council
- Electoral ward: Manurewa-Papakura ward
- Local board: Manurewa Local Board

Area
  - Land: 174 ha (430 acres)

Population (June 2025)
  - Total: 6,400
  - Density: 3,700/km^{2} (9,500/sq mi)

Manukau Central	Totara Heights	The Gardens
Homai	Hillpark	Alfriston
Manurewa	Manurewa	Randwick Park

Hillpark, also known as Hill Park, is a suburb of Manurewa, Auckland, New Zealand. It is bordered by suburbs of The Gardens on the east and Manurewa on the south, and is governed by Auckland Council. The suburb is characterised by its heritage status, modernist architecture, and setting within native bush.

== Geography ==
Hillpark is bordered by Puhinui Creek to the north and the Auckland Southern Motorway to the east. Hill Road is a major arterial route which bisects the suburb. During the 19th century, much of the area was an 150 acres (61 ha) block of native forest known as Ligar's Bush, named after Charles Whybrow Ligar. Areas of this forest block have been retained in some of the parks and reserves in the suburb.

== History ==
In 1910, David Laurence Nathan, son of prominent merchant David Nathan, and his wife Simone built their summer residence in Manurewa and named the property 'The Hill'. The estate was rebuilt in 1925, after a fire destroyed the original building.

In 1958, it was proposed that a portion of the Nathan family's estate would become a subdivision known as Hillpark Estate, referencing the Nathan family home. The suburb developed due to the construction of the Auckland Southern Motorway.

Construction on the suburb began in 1960 with the first sections of the Hillpark subdivision going on the market on 2 December 1961. The remaining 3.25 ha (8.0 acres) of the former Nathan estate became David Nathan Park.

In 1966 the Hillpark Shopping Centre was constructed. Construction of suburban housing in the suburb continues until 1973.

In 2016 Auckland Council recognised Hillpark as a Special Character Area.

In August 2021 The New Zealand Geographic Board gazetted Hillpark as an official suburb. The NZGB followed a Hillpark Residents' Association proposal to make official the suburb name at its meeting in July, 2020. The Association described its unique natural and heritage characteristics which have helped build a suburban identity and which should be recognised.

== Area landmarks ==
=== The Nathan Homestead ===
The Nathan Homestead is a historic mansion built in 1925 and is situated on nine acres of lawn and gardens. This landmark is situated in Hill Rd, Hillpark. The original summer residence of Nathan family was built in 1910 but was destroyed by fire in 1923 and a new permanent residence was rebuilt on the same site in 1925. The former Manukau Borough Council acquired the homestead and surrounding gardens in 1961. It later served as Manukau City Council offices before being restored and reopened as a community and cultural centre in 1978.

=== Orford Lodge ===
The Orford Lodge is situated on 8-10 Earls Court, Hillpark. The house was built in 1910 by a lawyer, Mr Edward Russell. It is listed as Grade II historical and architectural merit. The lodge itself shows the hallmarks of the architecture of its time, strongly influenced by Arts and Crafts architect James Chapman-Taylor. The house and 9ha of land were bought for £12,000 in 1928 by Robert Walpole, 5th Earl of Orford. During the Second World War, the lodge and grounds were used by the US Army. The lodge and land were bought by the Manurewa Borough Council in 1961. The lodge and some of the land was sold but the native bush surrounding the property was designated as a council Orford Park. The house is currently a privately owned residence.

=== Hillpark Native Forest Remnants ===
Mature native forest is now very rare in urban Auckland. Some examples of mature totara, puriri, kahikatea, pukatea, and kanuka forest are found in a cluster of council reserves in Hillpark. These include the Hillcrest Grove Reserve (73 Hill Road, Hillpark), Orford Park (40 Hill Road, Hillpark), and David Nathan Park (68 Hill Road, Hillpark). Thenative forest parks of Hillpark along with the nearby Auckland Botanic Gardens are the home of native and introduced birds tūī, rosella, kererū, and ruru.

== Demographics ==
Hillpark covers 1.74 km^{2} (0.67 sq mi) and had an estimated population of 6,400 as of June 2025, with a population density of 3,678 people per km^{2}.

Historical population
Year	Pop.	±% p.a.
2006	4,566	—
2013	5,016	+1.35%
2018	5,673	+2.49%
2023	5,595	−0.28%
The 2006 population is for a slightly larger area of 1.75 km^{2}. Source:

Hillpark had a population of 5,595 in the 2023 New Zealand census, a decrease of 78 people (−1.4%) since the 2018 census, and an increase of 579 people (11.5%) since the 2013 census. There were 2,769 males, 2,817 females and 9 people of other genders in 1,650 dwellings. 2.2% of people identified as LGBTIQ+. The median age was 34.1 years (compared with 38.1 years nationally). There were 1,173 people (21.0%) aged under 15 years, 1,170 (20.9%) aged 15 to 29, 2,607 (46.6%) aged 30 to 64, and 645 (11.5%) aged 65 or older.

People could identify as more than one ethnicity. The results were 38.8% European (Pākehā); 18.3% Māori; 26.2% Pasifika; 33.5% Asian; 1.9% Middle Eastern, Latin American and African New Zealanders (MELAA); and 1.8% other, which includes people giving their ethnicity as "New Zealander". English was spoken by 89.7%, Māori language by 3.6%, Samoan by 7.3%, and other languages by 29.3%. No language could be spoken by 3.4% (e.g. too young to talk). New Zealand Sign Language was known by 0.3%. The percentage of people born overseas was 39.7, compared with 28.8% nationally.

Religious affiliations were 39.2% Christian, 7.2% Hindu, 2.3% Islam, 1.4% Māori religious beliefs, 1.4% Buddhist, 0.3% New Age, 0.1% Jewish, and 10.9% other religions. People who answered that they had no religion were 30.7%, and 6.7% of people did not answer the census question.

Of those at least 15 years old, 996 (22.5%) people had a bachelor's or higher degree, 2,046 (46.3%) had a post-high school certificate or diploma, and 1,377 (31.1%) people exclusively held high school qualifications. The median income was $44,800, compared with $41,500 nationally. 465 people (10.5%) earned over $100,000 compared to 12.1% nationally. The employment status of those at least 15 was that 2,469 (55.8%) people were employed full-time, 498 (11.3%) were part-time, and 144 (3.3%) were unemployed.

Individual statistical areas
Name	Area (km^{2})	Population	Density (per km^{2})	Dwellings	Median age	Median income
Hillpark North	0.66	2,472	3,745	702	34.3 years	$47,000
Hillpark South	1.08	3,126	2,894	948	34.0 years	$43,100
New Zealand					38.1 years	$41,500

== Education ==
Hillpark School is a coeducational contributing primary school (years 1–6) with a roll of 487 as of July 2026. The school was established in February 1967.

== Local government ==
Hillpark is a part of the Manurewa local board area. The residents of Manurewa elect a local board, and two councillors from the Manurewa-Papakura ward to sit on the Auckland Council.
