= Randwick Park =

- Suburb
- Interactive map of Randwick Park
- Coordinates: 37.025°S 174.920°E
- Country: New Zealand
- City: Auckland
- Local authority: Auckland Council
- Electoral ward: Manurewa-Papakura ward
- Local board: Manurewa Local Board

Area
  - Land: 145 ha (360 acres)

Population (June 2025)
  - Total: 6,700
  - Density: 4,600/km^{2} (12,000/sq mi)

Hillpark	Alfriston	Clevedon
Manurewa	Randwick Park	Ardmore
Conifer Grove	Takanini	Papakura

Randwick Park is a suburb of Auckland, New Zealand.

The suburb is located east of Manurewa and is in the Manurewa-Papakura ward, one of the thirteen administrative divisions of Auckland Council.

The suburb had high unemployment and high crime rates in the early 2000s, but after a liquor store owner was killed in 2008, a residents' association was formed to improve local sports and community facilities, with support from the Manurewa Local Board and Auckland Council's Southern Initiative program. It was named the Mitre10 Community of the Year in 2017.

== Demographics ==
Randwick Park covers 1.45 km^{2} (0.56 sq mi) and had an estimated population of 6,700 as of June 2025, with a population density of 4,621 people per km^{2}.

Historical population
Year	Pop.	±% p.a.
2006	5,553	—
2013	5,772	+0.55%
2018	6,150	+1.28%
2023	5,949	−0.66%

Randwick Park had a population of 5,949 in the 2023 New Zealand census, a decrease of 201 people (−3.3%) since the 2018 census, and an increase of 177 people (3.1%) since the 2013 census. There were 3,036 males, 2,910 females and 6 people of other genders in 1,602 dwellings. 1.8% of people identified as LGBTIQ+. The median age was 28.9 years (compared with 38.1 years nationally). There were 1,596 people (26.8%) aged under 15 years, 1,497 (25.2%) aged 15 to 29, 2,502 (42.1%) aged 30 to 64, and 354 (6.0%) aged 65 or older.

People could identify as more than one ethnicity. The results were 18.8% European (Pākehā); 28.0% Māori; 40.5% Pasifika; 29.7% Asian; 3.2% Middle Eastern, Latin American and African New Zealanders (MELAA); and 1.1% other, which includes people giving their ethnicity as "New Zealander". English was spoken by 90.1%, Māori language by 6.7%, Samoan by 13.2%, and other languages by 26.9%. No language could be spoken by 3.2% (e.g. too young to talk). New Zealand Sign Language was known by 0.4%. The percentage of people born overseas was 39.8, compared with 28.8% nationally.

Religious affiliations were 40.5% Christian, 9.3% Hindu, 3.0% Islam, 2.8% Māori religious beliefs, 2.0% Buddhist, 0.1% New Age, 0.1% Jewish, and 7.5% other religions. People who answered that they had no religion were 27.6%, and 7.4% of people did not answer the census question.

Of those at least 15 years old, 588 (13.5%) people had a bachelor's or higher degree, 2,082 (47.8%) had a post-high school certificate or diploma, and 1,686 (38.7%) people exclusively held high school qualifications. The median income was $36,800, compared with $41,500 nationally. 183 people (4.2%) earned over $100,000 compared to 12.1% nationally. The employment status of those at least 15 was that 2,295 (52.7%) people were employed full-time, 393 (9.0%) were part-time, and 264 (6.1%) were unemployed.

Individual statistical areas
Name	Area (km^{2})	Population	Density (per km^{2})	Dwellings	Median age	Median income
Randwick Park East	0.75	2,475	3,300	708	32.4 years	$40,800
Randwick Park West	0.70	3,477	4,967	894	26.5 years	$33,600
New Zealand					38.1 years	$41,500

== Education ==
Randwick Park School is a coeducational full primary school (years 1–8) with a roll of 695 as of July 2026. About half the students have Pacific heritage, and over a fifth are Māori. Some classes are taught in the Māori language.

Te Kura Ākonga o Manurewa was a state-integrated full primary school (years 1–8) teaching primarily in the Māori language. It closed in 2025 and its integration agreement was cancelled.
