= Totara Heights =

- Suburb
- Interactive map of Totara Heights
- Coordinates: 37°00′07″S 174°54′05″E
- Country: New Zealand
- City: Auckland
- Local authority: Auckland Council
- Electoral ward: Manurewa-Papakura ward
- Local board: Manurewa Local Board

Area
  - Land: 85 ha (210 acres)

Population (June 2025)
  - Total: 3,300
  - Density: 3,900/km^{2} (10,000/sq mi)

Manukau	Goodwood Heights	Flat Bush
Wiri	Totara Heights	Totara Park
Homai	Hillpark	The Gardens

Totara Heights is a suburb of Auckland, New Zealand. It is located south of Goodwood Heights, east of Wiri and north of The Gardens.

== Demographics ==
Totara Heights covers 0.85 km^{2} (0.33 sq mi) and had an estimated population of 3,300 as of June 2025, with a population density of 3,882 people per km^{2}.

Historical population
Year	Pop.	±% p.a.
2006	2,394	—
2013	2,340	−0.33%
2018	2,712	+2.99%
2023	2,934	+1.59%

Totara Heights had a population of 2,934 in the 2023 New Zealand census, an increase of 222 people (8.2%) since the 2018 census, and an increase of 594 people (25.4%) since the 2013 census. There were 1,473 males, 1,452 females and 6 people of other genders in 849 dwellings. 2.9% of people identified as LGBTIQ+. The median age was 34.9 years (compared with 38.1 years nationally). There were 558 people (19.0%) aged under 15 years, 621 (21.2%) aged 15 to 29, 1,446 (49.3%) aged 30 to 64, and 309 (10.5%) aged 65 or older.

People could identify as more than one ethnicity. The results were 31.8% European (Pākehā); 13.7% Māori; 25.5% Pasifika; 42.1% Asian; 2.5% Middle Eastern, Latin American and African New Zealanders (MELAA); and 2.6% other, which includes people giving their ethnicity as "New Zealander". English was spoken by 91.9%, Māori language by 2.7%, Samoan by 8.3%, and other languages by 32.3%. No language could be spoken by 2.6% (e.g. too young to talk). New Zealand Sign Language was known by 0.6%. The percentage of people born overseas was 46.1, compared with 28.8% nationally.

Religious affiliations were 39.5% Christian, 10.9% Hindu, 3.8% Islam, 0.5% Māori religious beliefs, 3.0% Buddhist, 0.2% New Age, and 5.6% other religions. People who answered that they had no religion were 30.7%, and 6.2% of people did not answer the census question.

Of those at least 15 years old, 678 (28.5%) people had a bachelor's or higher degree, 1,062 (44.7%) had a post-high school certificate or diploma, and 633 (26.6%) people exclusively held high school qualifications. The median income was $50,000, compared with $41,500 nationally. 291 people (12.2%) earned over $100,000 compared to 12.1% nationally. The employment status of those at least 15 was that 1,416 (59.6%) people were employed full-time, 261 (11.0%) were part-time, and 69 (2.9%) were unemployed.
