= Alfriston, New Zealand =

Alfriston
- Locality
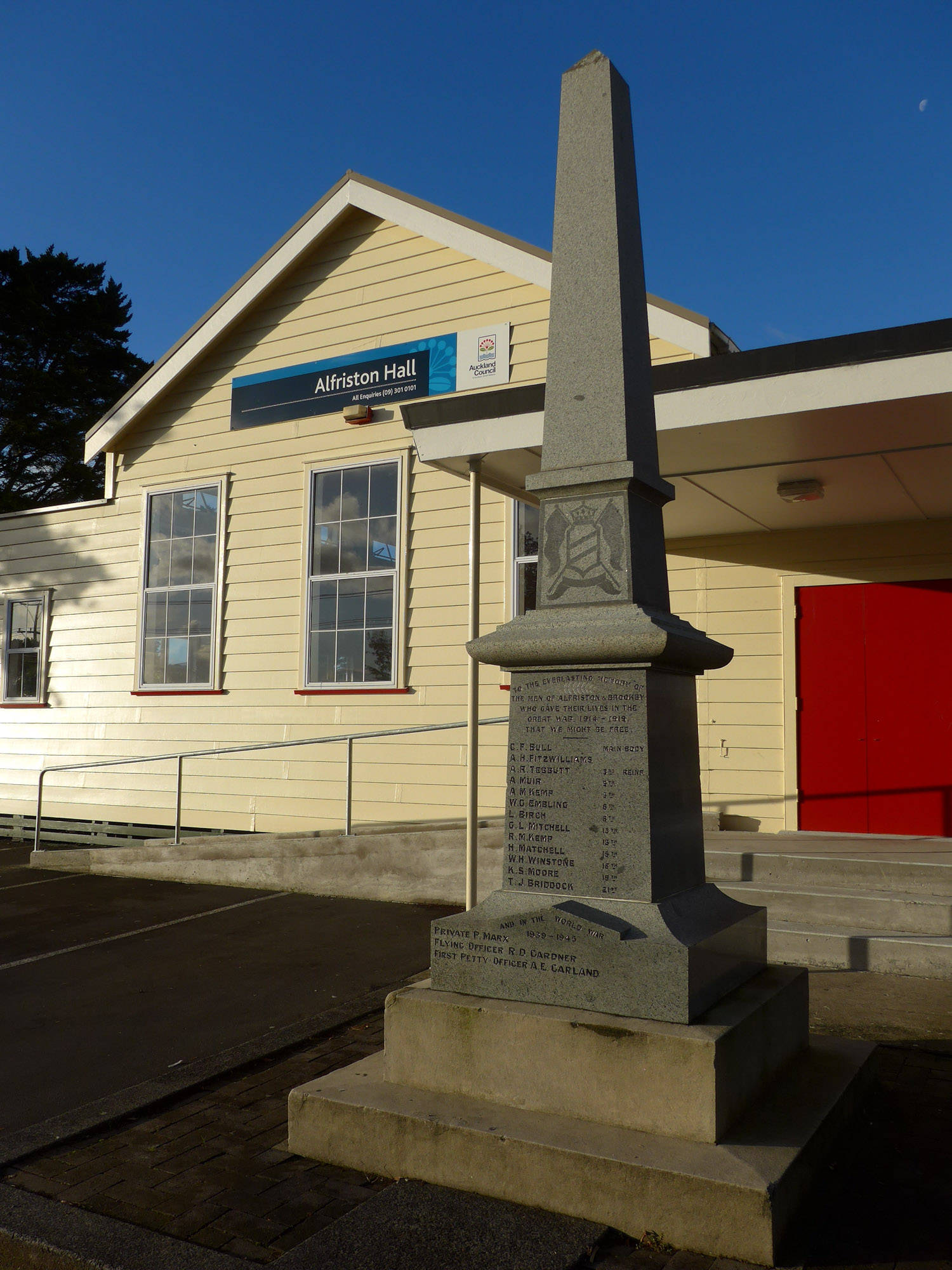
- Alfriston war memorial and hall
- Interactive map of Alfriston
- Coordinates: 37.017°S 174.939°E
- Country: New Zealand
- Council: Auckland Council
- Electoral ward: Manurewa-Papakura Ward
- Local board: Manurewa Local Board
- Electorates: Takanini; Tāmaki Makaurau (Māori)

Government
  - Territorial Authority: Auckland Council
  - Mayor of Auckland: Wayne Brown
  - Takanini MP: Rima Nakhle
  - Tāmaki Makaurau MP: Oriini Kaipara

Area
  - Land: 185 ha (460 acres)

Population (June 2025)
  - Total: 4,420
  - Density: 2,390/km^{2} (6,190/sq mi)

The Gardens	Flat Bush	Brookby
Manurewa	Alfriston	Clevedon
Randwick Park	Takanini	Ardmore

Alfriston is a locality south of Auckland, New Zealand. Prior to November 2010 it was under the authority of the Papakura District Council and is now part of Auckland Council. Alfriston is in the Manurewa-Papakura ward, one of the thirteen administrative divisions of Auckland Council.

The town was settled in the 1840s and was originally named Papakura Valley, before the name was changed to Alfriston, after Alfriston, Sussex, home of one of the earliest settlers, Dr George Edward Bodle. The name of the town means Aelfric's village, named for Ælfric of Eynsham.

== Demographics ==
Alfriston covers 1.85 km^{2} (0.71 sq mi) and had an estimated population of 4,420 as of June 2025, with a population density of 2,389 people per km^{2}.

Historical population
Year	Pop.	±% p.a.
2006	2,520	—
2013	3,462	+4.64%
2018	3,771	+1.72%
2023	3,975	+1.06%
The 2006 population is for a larger area of 1.95 km^{2}. Source:

Alfriston had a population of 3,975 in the 2023 New Zealand census, an increase of 204 people (5.4%) since the 2018 census, and an increase of 513 people (14.8%) since the 2013 census. There were 1,938 males, 2,028 females and 6 people of other genders in 1,101 dwellings. 1.9% of people identified as LGBTIQ+. The median age was 35.8 years (compared with 38.1 years nationally). There were 813 people (20.5%) aged under 15 years, 792 (19.9%) aged 15 to 29, 1,710 (43.0%) aged 30 to 64, and 663 (16.7%) aged 65 or older.

People could identify as more than one ethnicity. The results were 30.5% European (Pākehā); 12.5% Māori; 18.7% Pasifika; 45.5% Asian; 4.7% Middle Eastern, Latin American and African New Zealanders (MELAA); and 1.5% other, which includes people giving their ethnicity as "New Zealander". English was spoken by 90.2%, Māori language by 2.8%, Samoan by 5.6%, and other languages by 37.9%. No language could be spoken by 2.6% (e.g. too young to talk). New Zealand Sign Language was known by 0.3%. The percentage of people born overseas was 46.5, compared with 28.8% nationally.

Religious affiliations were 35.6% Christian, 11.6% Hindu, 4.5% Islam, 0.7% Māori religious beliefs, 2.1% Buddhist, 0.1% New Age, 0.2% Jewish, and 13.7% other religions. People who answered that they had no religion were 27.3%, and 4.4% of people did not answer the census question.

Of those at least 15 years old, 765 (24.2%) people had a bachelor's or higher degree, 1,365 (43.2%) had a post-high school certificate or diploma, and 1,038 (32.8%) people exclusively held high school qualifications. The median income was $38,800, compared with $41,500 nationally. 324 people (10.2%) earned over $100,000 compared to 12.1% nationally. The employment status of those at least 15 was that 1,587 (50.2%) people were employed full-time, 303 (9.6%) were part-time, and 99 (3.1%) were unemployed.

== Notable places ==
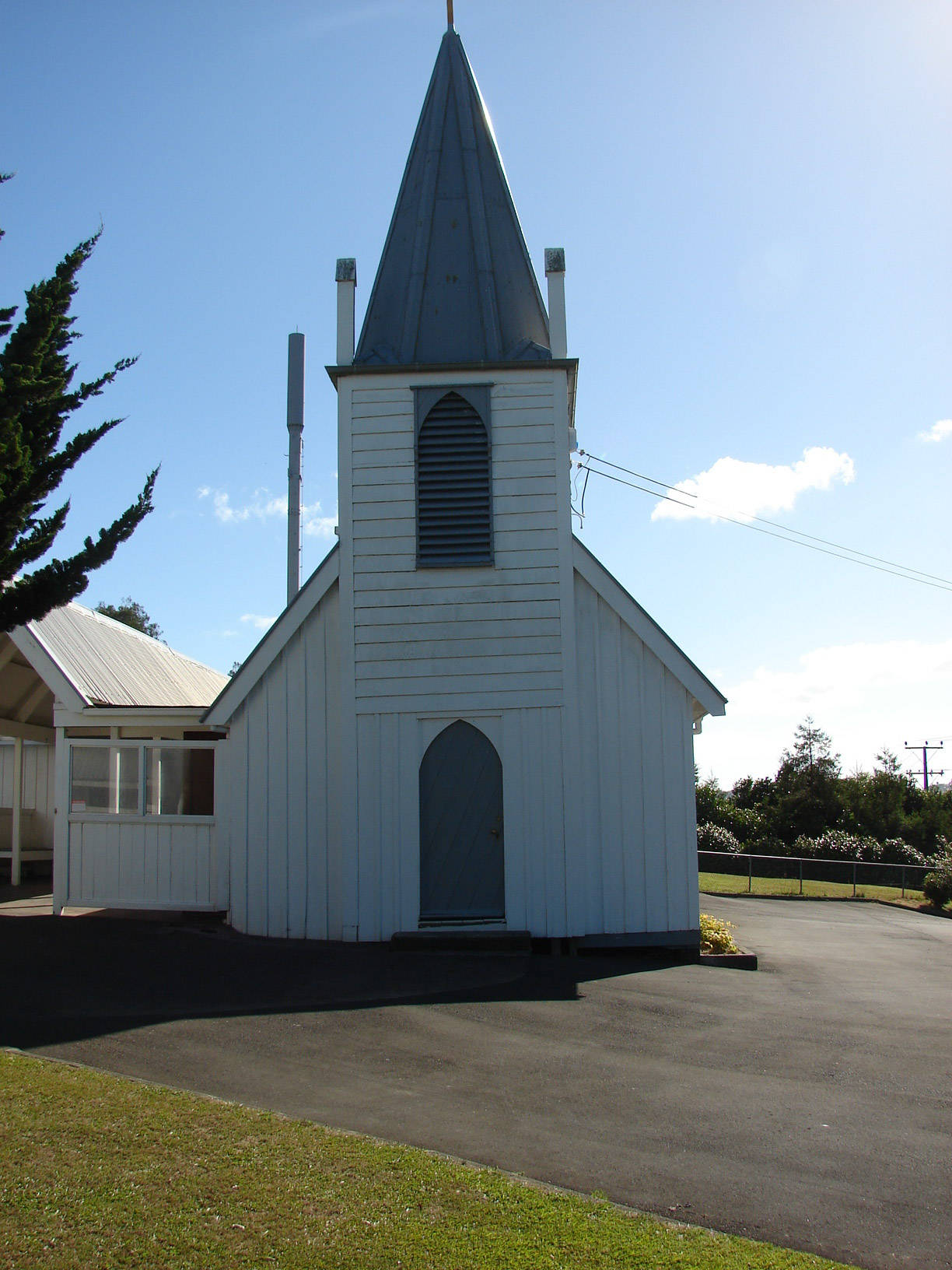
Christ Church in Alfriston

Christ Church was built in 1877. The Church has a tower and spire at the front.

== Education ==
Alfriston College is a secondary school (years 9–13) with a roll of 1,273. It opened in 2004.

Alfriston School is a full primary school (years 1–8) with a roll of 374.

Both these schools are coeducational. Rolls are as of July 2026.
