= Brookby =

- Locality
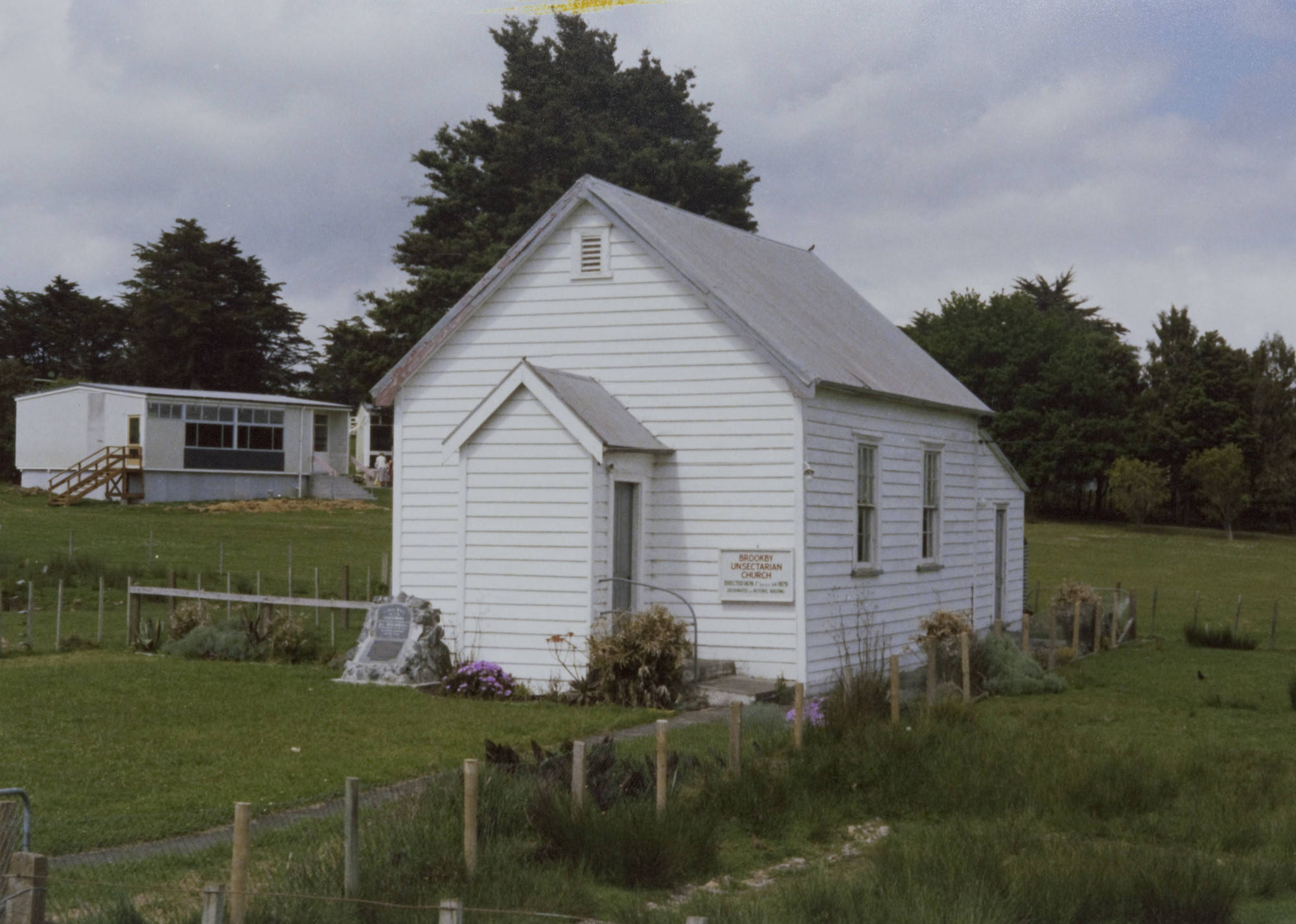
- Brookby Unsectarian Church, built in 1878
- Interactive map of Brookby
- Coordinates: 36.9870°S 174.9945°E
- Country: New Zealand
- Council: Auckland Council
- Electoral Ward: Franklin Ward
- Local board: Franklin Local Board
- Electorates: Papakura; Hauraki-Waikato (Māori)

Government
  - Territorial Authority: Auckland Council
  - Mayor of Auckland: Wayne Brown
  - Papakura MP: Vacant
  - Hauraki-Waikato MP: Hana-Rawhiti Maipi-Clarke

Area
  - Total: 336 ha (830 acres)

Population (2023)
  - Total: 129
  - Density: 38.4/km^{2} (99.4/sq mi)

Whitford
	Brookby	Clevedon
Alfriston, Ardmore

Brookby is a rural settlement, south of Auckland, New Zealand. Brookby is approximately 5 kilometres west of Clevedon and 5 km southeast of Whitford.

The original post-office was located near a Brook (Papakura Stream), and so was named by the brook, or Brookby.

== Notable places ==
Meadowbrook is the oldest extant home in the area. Meadowbrook was constructed by a Mr Lord in 1880 from locally milled kauri. The property also features a 26 m (85 ft) well.

Brookby Unsectarian Church is an 1878 Church that served as the centre of the community at Brookby.The Church contains a memorial stone to John and Leah Embling, who settled in Brookby in 1854.

== Demographics ==
Brookby is in an SA1 statistical area which covers 3.36 km^{2} (1.30 sq mi). The SA1 area is part of the larger Turanga statistical area.

Historical population
Year	Pop.	±% p.a.
2006	186	—
2013	117	−6.41%
2018	123	+1.01%
2023	129	+0.96%
The 2006 population is for a larger area of 8.25 km^{2}. Source:

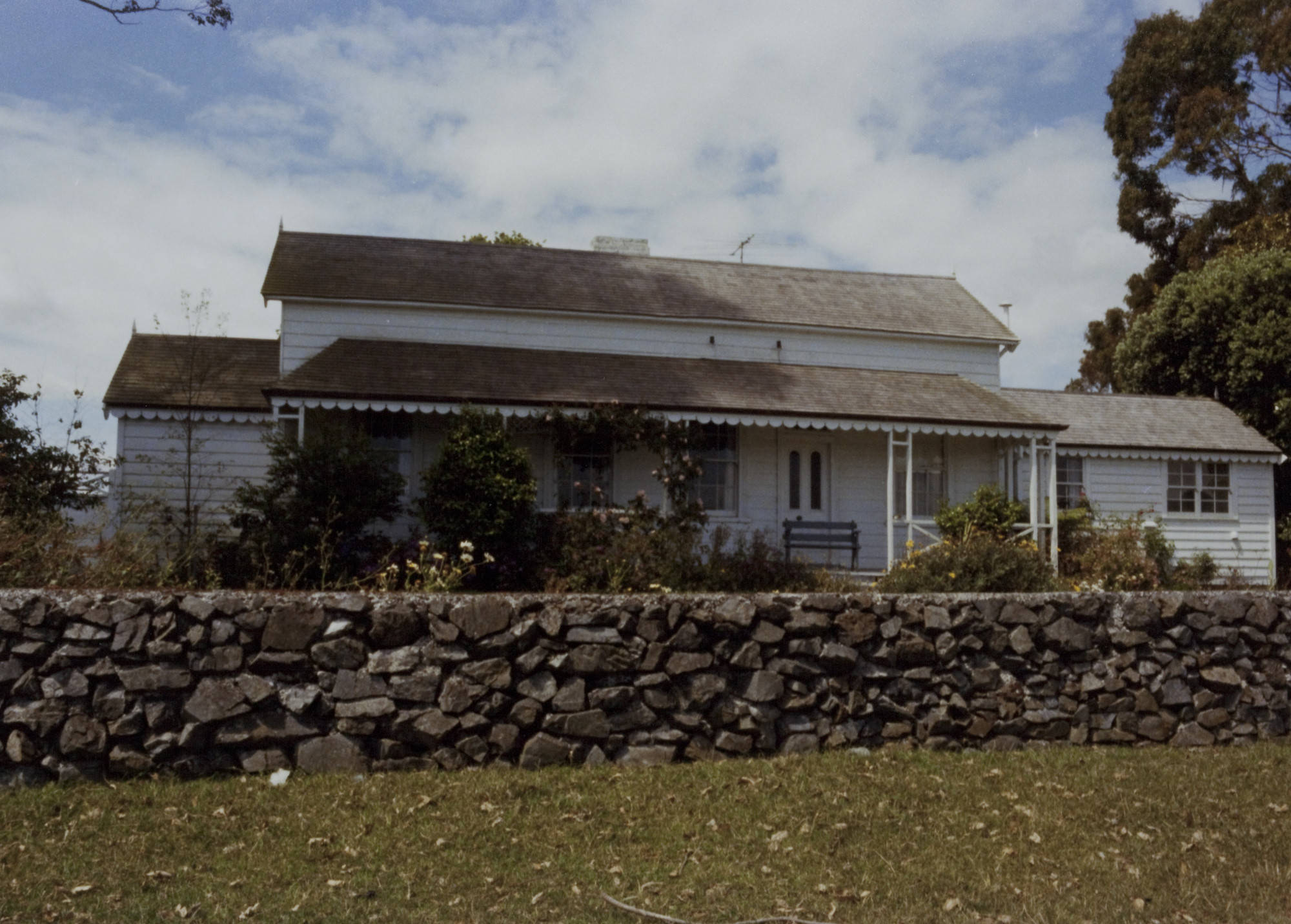
Meadowbrook

The SA1 statistical area had a population of 129 in the 2023 New Zealand census, an increase of 6 people (4.9%) since the 2018 census, and an increase of 12 people (10.3%) since the 2013 census. There were 66 males and 60 females in 39 dwellings. The median age was 42.3 years (compared with 38.1 years nationally). There were 21 people (16.3%) aged under 15 years, 21 (16.3%) aged 15 to 29, 63 (48.8%) aged 30 to 64, and 24 (18.6%) aged 65 or older.

People could identify as more than one ethnicity. The results were 86.0% European (Pākehā), 16.3% Māori, 2.3% Pasifika, and 9.3% Asian. English was spoken by 97.7%, and other languages by 9.3%. No language could be spoken by 2.3% (e.g. too young to talk). The percentage of people born overseas was 27.9, compared with 28.8% nationally.

Religious affiliations were 25.6% Christian. People who answered that they had no religion were 62.8%, and 9.3% of people did not answer the census question.

Of those at least 15 years old, 24 (22.2%) people had a bachelor's or higher degree, 63 (58.3%) had a post-high school certificate or diploma, and 18 (16.7%) people exclusively held high school qualifications. The median income was $51,900, compared with $41,500 nationally. 27 people (25.0%) earned over $100,000 compared to 12.1% nationally. The employment status of those at least 15 was that 69 (63.9%) people were employed full-time and 15 (13.9%) were part-time.

== Education ==
Brookby School is a coeducational full primary school (years 1–8) with a roll of 116 as of July 2026. The school opened in 1875.
