= The Gardens, Auckland =

The Gardens
- Suburb
- Interactive map of The Gardens
- Coordinates: 37°00′19″S 174°55′16″E
- Country: New Zealand
- City: Auckland
- Local authority: Auckland Council
- Electoral ward: Manurewa-Papakura ward
- Local board: Manurewa Local Board

Area
  - Land: 419 ha (1,040 acres)

Population (June 2025)
  - Total: 4,430
  - Density: 1,060/km^{2} (2,740/sq mi)

Totara Heights	Flat Bush	Totara Park
Hillpark	The Gardens	Clevedon
Manurewa	Alfriston	Ardmore

The Gardens is a suburb of Auckland, New Zealand. It is located to the north of Manurewa, east of Wiri and south of Totara Heights. The suburb is under the local governance of Auckland Council, and is defined by its location next to the Auckland Botanic Gardens.

== History ==
After the former Manukau City Council acquired the Totara Park land in 1966, its purchase also involved the subdivision of land bordered by the Botanic Gardens and Totara Park, the plans for The Gardens subdivision were drawn up as early as 1967, with development not starting until 1984.

In 1998 the Manukau City Council sold the remaining greenfield land to Summerland Property Developments Ltd, to which the company acquired neighbouring properties, eventually extending the subdivision to its final stage bordering Mill Road.

The Gardens School was opened in 2002, to cater for the increasing population of families. In 2014 the school was funded a $22 million NZD investment to rebuild the school entirely, completed in 2018.

== Demographics ==
The Gardens covers 4.19 km^{2} (1.62 sq mi) and had an estimated population of 4,430 as of June 2025, with a population density of 1,057 people per km^{2}.

Historical population
Year	Pop.	±% p.a.
2006	3,072	—
2013	3,489	+1.84%
2018	3,945	+2.49%
2023	4,014	+0.35%
The 2006 population is for a smaller area of 4.09 km^{2}. Source:

The Gardens had a population of 4,014 in the 2023 New Zealand census, an increase of 69 people (1.7%) since the 2018 census, and an increase of 525 people (15.0%) since the 2013 census. There were 1,959 males, 2,049 females and 6 people of other genders in 1,119 dwellings. 2.6% of people identified as LGBTIQ+. The median age was 37.4 years (compared with 38.1 years nationally). There were 792 people (19.7%) aged under 15 years, 780 (19.4%) aged 15 to 29, 1,926 (48.0%) aged 30 to 64, and 516 (12.9%) aged 65 or older.

People could identify as more than one ethnicity. The results were 44.2% European (Pākehā); 10.5% Māori; 17.4% Pasifika; 41.5% Asian; 2.8% Middle Eastern, Latin American and African New Zealanders (MELAA); and 1.3% other, which includes people giving their ethnicity as "New Zealander". English was spoken by 91.7%, Māori language by 1.9%, Samoan by 4.2%, and other languages by 35.1%. No language could be spoken by 2.2% (e.g. too young to talk). New Zealand Sign Language was known by 0.6%. The percentage of people born overseas was 41.9, compared with 28.8% nationally.

Religious affiliations were 34.8% Christian, 7.8% Hindu, 2.8% Islam, 0.7% Māori religious beliefs, 2.2% Buddhist, 0.1% New Age, 0.1% Jewish, and 10.2% other religions. People who answered that they had no religion were 36.1%, and 5.3% of people did not answer the census question.

Of those at least 15 years old, 912 (28.3%) people had a bachelor's or higher degree, 1,494 (46.4%) had a post-high school certificate or diploma, and 816 (25.3%) people exclusively held high school qualifications. The median income was $51,200, compared with $41,500 nationally. 522 people (16.2%) earned over $100,000 compared to 12.1% nationally. The employment status of those at least 15 was that 1,812 (56.2%) people were employed full-time, 378 (11.7%) were part-time, and 84 (2.6%) were unemployed.

== Education ==
The Gardens School is a coeducational full primary school (years 1–8) with a roll of 528 as of July 2026.
