= Manurewa Local Board =

Coordinates: 37.0208658°S 174.89691986°E

Manurewa Local Board Te Poari ā-Rohe o Manurewa
- Local board of Manurewa
- Country: New Zealand
- Region: Auckland
- Territorial authority: Auckland
- Ward: Manurewa-Papakura ward
- Legislated: 2010

Area
  - Land: 37.10 km^{2} (14.32 sq mi)

Population (June 2025)
  - Total: 110,400
  - Density: 2,976/km^{2} (7,707/sq mi)

Local Board Members

Leadership
- Chairperson: Heather Andrew, Manurewa Action Team
- Deputy chairperson: Italia Tipelu-Marsters, Manurewa Action Team

Structure
- Seats: 8
- Political groups: Manurewa Action Team (7); #LoveManurewa (1)
- Length of term: 3 years

Elections
- Last election: 2025
- Next election: 2028

Meeting place
- The Hill Road Library Complex, Shop 3-5, 7 Hill Road, Manurewa

The Manurewa Local Board (Māori: Te Poari ā-Rohe o Manurewa) is one of the 21 local boards of the Auckland Council. It is overseen by the Manurewa-Papakura ward councillors.

The local board area includes the areas of Wiri, Hillpark, Manurewa East, Homai, Weymouth and Wattle Downs.

== Geography ==
The area covered by the Manurewa Local Board includes a mixture of hills and Manukau Harbour coastline. It incorporates both the main suburb of Manurewa. and the surrounding suburbs of Manukau Heights, Totara Heights, Hillpark, Randwick Park, The Gardens, Alfriston, Wattle Downs, Weymouth, Clendon Park, Homai and Wiri.

There is an extensive range of shops along Great South Road, including Southmall Manurewa, while the Wiri industrial park is a major employment centre. Other features of the area include Auckland Botanic Gardens, Manurewa Aquatic Centre and the Randwick Park.

== Demographics ==
Manurewa Local Board Area covers 37.10 km^{2} (14.32 sq mi) and had an estimated population of 110,400 as of June 2025, with a population density of 2,976 people per km^{2}.

Historical population
Year	Pop.	±% p.a.
2006	77,190	—
2013	82,242	+0.91%
2018	95,670	+3.07%
2023	98,784	+0.64%

Manurewa Local Board Area had a population of 98,784 in the 2023 New Zealand census, an increase of 3,114 people (3.3%) since the 2018 census, and an increase of 16,542 people (20.1%) since the 2013 census. There were 49,302 males, 49,233 females and 249 people of other genders in 25,938 dwellings. 2.2% of people identified as LGBTIQ+. The median age was 31.0 years (compared with 38.1 years nationally). There were 24,000 people (24.3%) aged under 15 years, 23,682 (24.0%) aged 15 to 29, 41,994 (42.5%) aged 30 to 64, and 9,105 (9.2%) aged 65 or older.

People could identify as more than one ethnicity. The results were 24.5% European (Pākehā); 25.2% Māori; 39.9% Pasifika; 27.6% Asian; 2.1% Middle Eastern, Latin American and African New Zealanders (MELAA); and 1.1% other, which includes people giving their ethnicity as "New Zealander". English was spoken by 90.7%, Māori language by 6.4%, Samoan by 13.4%, and other languages by 24.8%. No language could be spoken by 3.0% (e.g. too young to talk). New Zealand Sign Language was known by 0.5%. The percentage of people born overseas was 38.5, compared with 28.8% nationally.

Religious affiliations were 44.0% Christian, 8.1% Hindu, 3.1% Islam, 2.6% Māori religious beliefs, 1.5% Buddhist, 0.2% New Age, 0.1% Jewish, and 5.0% other religions. People who answered that they had no religion were 29.1%, and 6.6% of people did not answer the census question.

Of those at least 15 years old, 11,724 (15.7%) people had a bachelor's or higher degree, 35,688 (47.7%) had a post-high school certificate or diploma, and 27,378 (36.6%) people exclusively held high school qualifications. The median income was $37,300, compared with $41,500 nationally. 4,629 people (6.2%) earned over $100,000 compared to 12.1% nationally. The employment status of those at least 15 was that 37,782 (50.5%) people were employed full-time, 6,786 (9.1%) were part-time, and 3,870 (5.2%) were unemployed.

== 2025-2028 term ==
The current board members for the 2025-2028 term, elected at the 2025 local elections, are:

Name	Affiliation	Position
Heather Andrew	Manurewa Action Team	Chairperson
Italia Tipelu-Marsters	Manurewa Action Team	Deputy Chairperson
Glenn Murphy	Manurewa Action Team	Board member
Joseph Allan	#LoveManurewa	Board member
Rangi McLean	Manurewa Action Team	Board member
Marshal Ahluwalia	Manurewa Action Team	Board member
Phyllis Latu	Manurewa Action Team	Board member
Raewyn Bhana	Manurewa Action Team	Board member

In May 2026, Auckland Council referred board member Marshal Ahluwalia to the Serious Fraud Office following allegations of corruption and financial intimidation. Following this, Ahluwalia took a leave of absence before resuming his duties in late-June. In response to his return, Manurewa-Papakura councillors Daniel Newman and Matt Winiata said they would be boycotting the board's business meetings as long as Ahluwalia stayed on as a board member.

In August 2026, The New Zealand Herald reported that a whistleblower had made allegations of electoral fraud for the elections to the Manurewa local board during the 2025 elections to Auckland Council. The council passed the allegations onto the police and the Serious Fraud Office, and appointed independent governance observers Michael Barnett, former head of the Auckland Chamber of Commerce, and Tania Winslade to the Manurewa local board.

== 2022-2025 term ==
The board members for the 2022-2025 term, elected at the 2022 local elections, were:

Name	Ticket (if any)	Position
Matt Winiata	Manurewa Action Team	Chairperson
Glenn Murphy	Manurewa Action Team	Deputy Chairperson
Rangi McLean	Manurewa Action Team	Board member
Joseph Allan	#LoveManurewa	Board member
Andrew Lesa	#LoveManurewa	Board member
Angela Cunningham-Marino	#LoveManurewa	Board member
Anne Candy	Manurewa Action Team	Board member
Heather Andrew	Manurewa Action Team	Board member

In July 2025, Andrew Lesa announced his resignation from all public and governance roles, including his position on the Manurewa Local Board, following a Stuff investigation which found that parts of his publicly stated biography were inaccurate.

== 2019–2022 term ==
The board members for the 2019-2022 term, elected at the 2019 local body elections, were:

- Joseph Allan, Manurewa Action Team – (7027 votes)
- Anne Candy, Manurewa Action Team – (6712 votes)
- Rangi McLean, Manurewa Action Team – (6695 votes)
- Ken Penney, Manurewa Action Team – (6682 votes)
- Glenn Murphy, Manurewa Action Team – (6041 votes)
- Melissa Atama, Manurewa Action Team – (6030 votes)
- David Pizzini, Manurewa Action Team – (5843 votes)
- Tabetha Gorrie, Manurewa Action Team – (4963 votes)

== 2016–2019 term ==
The board members who served from the 2016 local body elections to the 2019 elections were:

- Angela Dalton (Chair)
- Stella Cattle (Deputy chair)
- Joseph Allan
- Rangi McLean
- Sarah Colcord
- Angela Cunningham-Marino
- Ken Penney
- Dave Pizzini
