= Manukau =

- Suburb
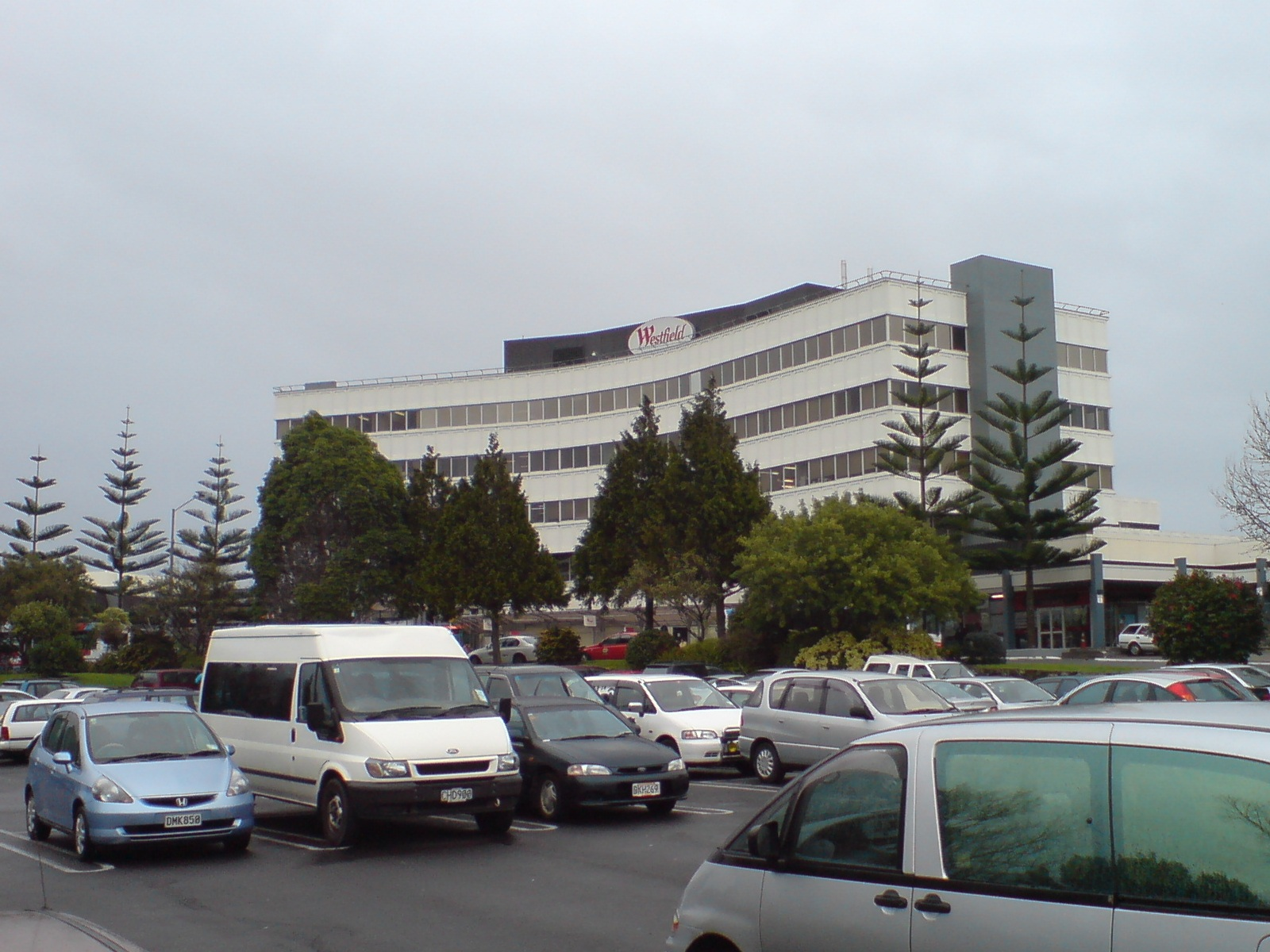
- Central office block of Westfield Manukau City
- Interactive map of Manukau
- Coordinates: 36°59′S 174°53′E
- Country: New Zealand
- City: Auckland
- Local authority: Auckland Council
- Electoral ward: Manukau ward
- Local board: Ōtara-Papatoetoe Local Board
- Board subdivision: Papatoetoe

Area
  - Land: 1,202 ha (2,970 acres)

Population (June 2025)
  - Total: 4,360
  - Density: 363/km^{2} (939/sq mi)
- Train stations: Manukau Train Station

Papatoetoe	Papatoetoe	Clover Park
Wiri	Manukau	Goodwood Heights
Clendon Park	Manurewa	Totara Heights

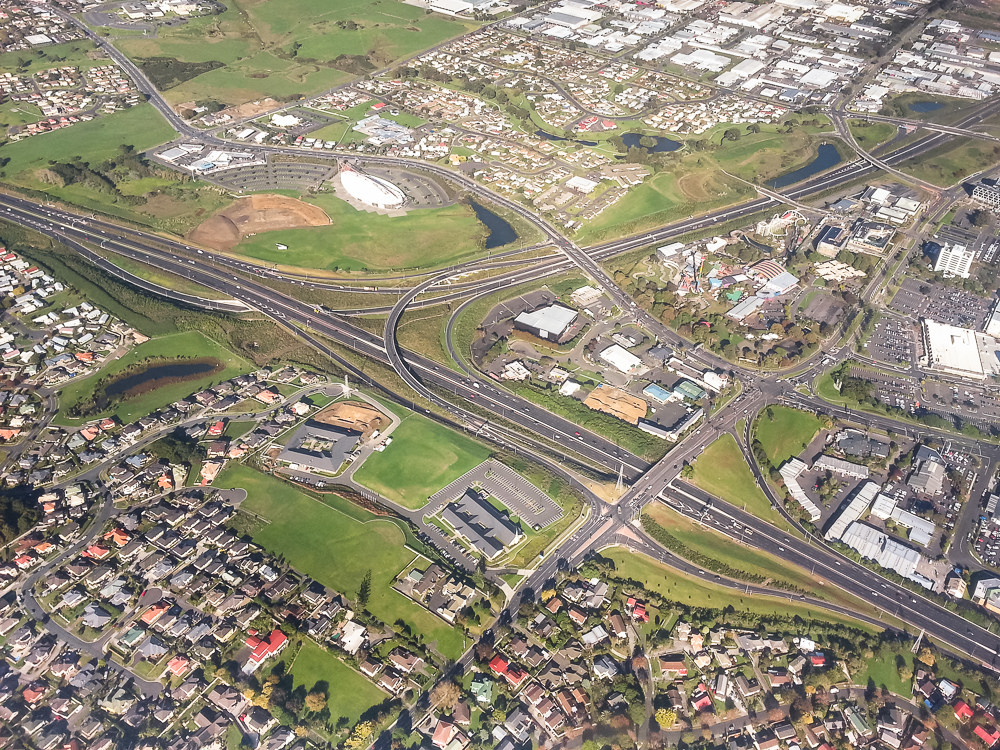
State Highway 1 – State Highway 20 interchange

Manukau (/ˈmɑːnʊˌkaʊ/), or Manukau Central, is a suburb of South Auckland, New Zealand. Centred on the Manukau City Centre business district, it is located 23 kilometres south of the Auckland Central Business District. Manukau is situated south of Papatoetoe, south-west of Flat Bush, and north of Manurewa and Wiri.

Manukau's name originates from the Manukau Harbour and means "only birds" ("manu kau") in Māori. Prior to the suburb, the name Manukau was given to the much larger districts Manukau County (1876–1965) and Manukau City (1965–2010).

The headquarters of Manukau City Council were in Manukau Central until the council was merged into Auckland Council in November 2010. Manukau Central should not be confused with Manukau City, which was the entire area administered by the city council.

== History ==
The Manukau Central area was part of the largely rural area of Wiri in the early 20th century. Its transition from farmland was driven by Manukau City Council, which was formed in 1965 and purchased land there in 1966 for the development of an administrative and commercial centre. The Manukau City Centre mall, now Westfield Manukau, opened in October 1976, and the Manukau City Council administration building in 1977. Several government departments established offices in the late 1970s.

In 1983 Manukau City Council decided to rename the area Manukau Central, with the name Wiri continuing for the industrial area to the west. The name Manukau City Centre has been used for the central business district around the mall and city council building.

The Rainbow's End theme park opened just south of the city centre in 1982. Another shopping centre, Manukau Supa Centa, opened to the west of the city centre in 1998. Vodafone Events Centre (now Due Drop Events Centre), a multi-purpose event centre, opened in 2005. Manukau Institute of Technology, which has its main campus at Ōtara, built two campuses at Manukau Central: Manukau in 2014, with the Manukau train station below, and Tech Park in 2020.

== Demographics ==
Manukau covers 12.02 km^{2} (4.64 sq mi) and had an estimated population of 4,360 as of June 2025, with a population density of 363 people per km^{2}.

Historical population
Year	Pop.	±% p.a.
2006	2,739	—
2013	3,132	+1.93%
2018	3,450	+1.95%
2023	3,687	+1.34%

Manukau had a population of 3,687 in the 2023 New Zealand census, an increase of 237 people (6.9%) since the 2018 census, and an increase of 555 people (17.7%) since the 2013 census. There were 1,890 males, 1,791 females and 9 people of other genders in 1,248 dwellings. 2.8% of people identified as LGBTIQ+. The median age was 34.6 years (compared with 38.1 years nationally). There were 642 people (17.4%) aged under 15 years, 825 (22.4%) aged 15 to 29, 1,815 (49.2%) aged 30 to 64, and 402 (10.9%) aged 65 or older.

People could identify as more than one ethnicity. The results were 17.8% European (Pākehā); 12.9% Māori; 26.6% Pasifika; 51.9% Asian; 2.0% Middle Eastern, Latin American and African New Zealanders (MELAA); and 1.5% other, which includes people giving their ethnicity as "New Zealander". English was spoken by 87.0%, Māori language by 2.5%, Samoan by 9.1%, and other languages by 40.9%. No language could be spoken by 2.8% (e.g. too young to talk). New Zealand Sign Language was known by 0.2%. The percentage of people born overseas was 54.3, compared with 28.8% nationally.

Religious affiliations were 35.0% Christian, 16.7% Hindu, 6.8% Islam, 1.0% Māori religious beliefs, 2.1% Buddhist, 0.1% New Age, and 12.8% other religions. People who answered that they had no religion were 19.7%, and 5.9% of people did not answer the census question.

Of those at least 15 years old, 621 (20.4%) people had a bachelor's or higher degree, 1,287 (42.3%) had a post-high school certificate or diploma, and 1,146 (37.6%) people exclusively held high school qualifications. The median income was $41,100, compared with $41,500 nationally. 162 people (5.3%) earned over $100,000 compared to 12.1% nationally. The employment status of those at least 15 was that 1,650 (54.2%) people were employed full-time, 267 (8.8%) were part-time, and 132 (4.3%) were unemployed.

Individual statistical areas
Name	Area (km^{2})	Population	Density (per km^{2})	Dwellings	Median age	Median income
Manukau Central	11.41	963	84	483	34.6 years	$45,200
Puhinui East	0.60	2,727	4,545	762	34.6 years	$39,200
New Zealand					38.1 years	$41,500

The Manukau Central area is mostly commercial or rural. The Puhinui East area is mostly residential.

== Local government ==
The suburb has been in the Manukau ward, one of the thirteen electoral divisions of Auckland Council, since November 2010.

== Economy ==
Westfield Manukau City was established in 1976. It has a lettable area of 45,236 m^{2}, and has 2,113 carparks and 187 shops, including Farmers, Woolworths, JB Hi-Fi and Event Cinemas.

Manukau Supa Centa covers 37,010 m^{2}. It has 40 stores including Kmart.

== Transport ==
Manukau is well-connected for transport. The Southwestern Motorway (State Highway 20) joins the Southern Motorway (State Highway 1) at Manukau Central. East West Line train services carry passengers between Manukau railway station and Swanson railway station. Adjacent to the train station is the Manukau bus station (opened April 2018), connecting southern and eastern suburbs and a stop for inter-city services.

== Education ==
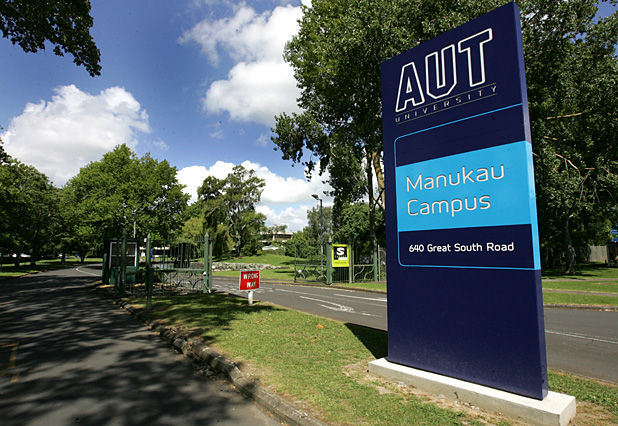
AUT South Campus entrance

Puhinui School is a state contributing primary school (years 1–6). It has a roll of 768.

South Auckland Seventh-day Adventist School is a state-integrated full primary school (years 1–8). It has a roll of 353.

Both schools are coeducational. Rolls are as of July 2026.

Manukau also has the South Campus of Auckland University of Technology and the Manukau and Tech Park Campuses of Manukau Institute of Technology.

Redoubt North School is a full primary (years 1–8) school with a roll of 475.
