= Auckland Botanic Gardens =

Botanical garden in Auckland, New Zealand

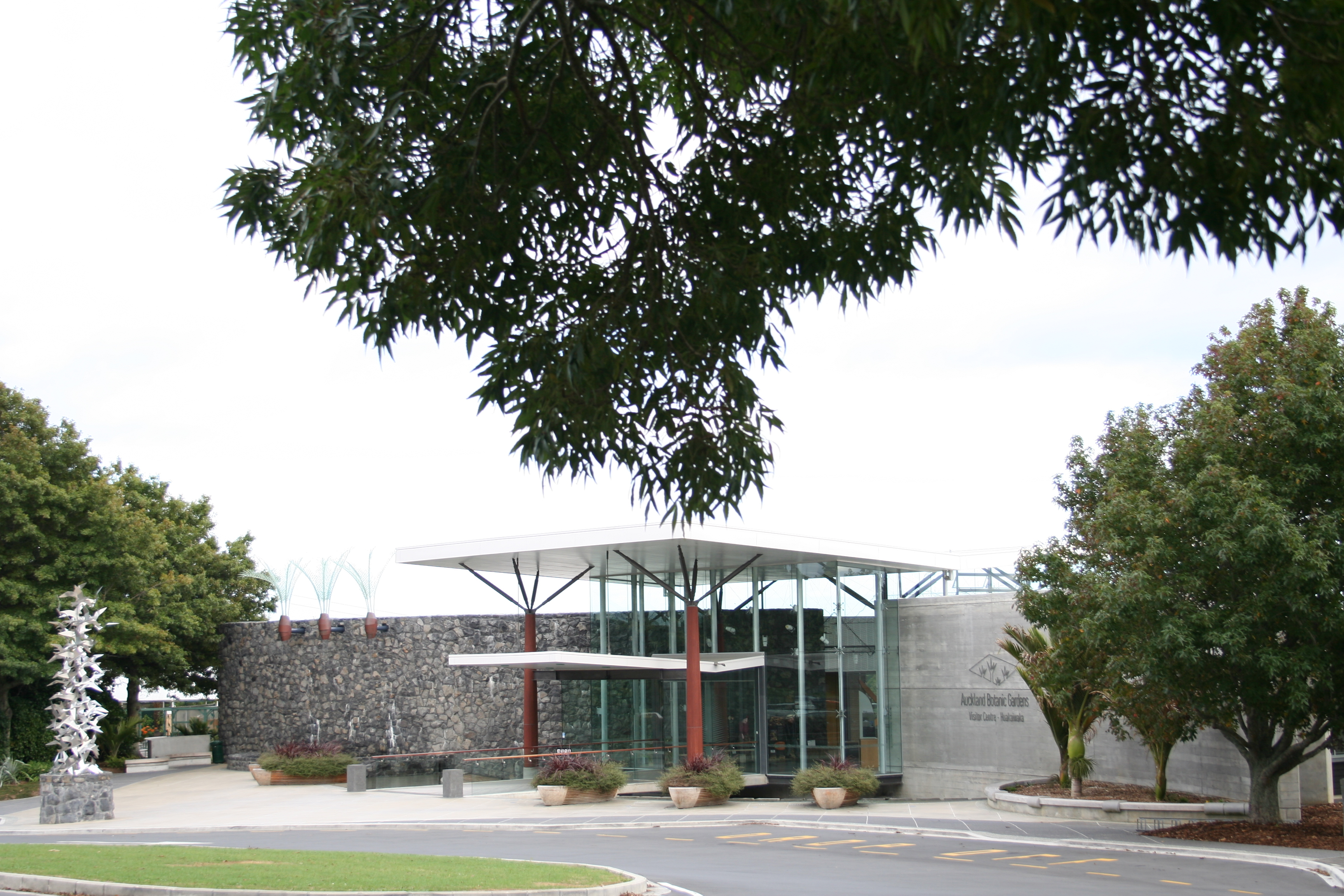
- Auckland Botanic Gardens Visitor Centre
- Interactive map of Auckland Botanic Gardens
- Type: Botanic Garden
- Location: Manurewa, Auckland, New Zealand
- Coordinates: 37.0130°S 174.9075°E
- Area: 64 hectares (160 acres)
- Created: February 23, 1982
- Operator: Auckland Council
- Visitors: 1+ million (approx. per year)
- Website: www.aucklandbotanicgardens.co.nz

Auckland Botanic Gardens is a botanical garden in the New Zealand city of Auckland. It is located in the suburb of Manurewa, in the Manurewa Local Board Area. The garden covers 64 hectares (160 acres), and holds more than 10,000 plants.

Land for the garden was purchased in 1968, developments started in 1973 and the garden opened to the public in 1982. Since its establishment, the garden has been owned and operated by Auckland Council and its predecessors Auckland Regional Authority and Auckland Regional Council.

== Location ==
The Auckland Botanic Gardens is the site of the former Nathan family estate established in 1910, where David Lawrence Nathan constructed a large summer house at the property, which he referred to as "The Hill". By 1920, the family made the estate their permanent home. In 1923, a fire demolished the homestead, which was replaced with a brick Basque-inspired building in 1925, designed by D. B. Patterson.

During the second world war, two military camps were established at the estate: Top Camp and Grande Vue Camp, both occupied by American marines on rest duty, and later by New Zealand troops. After the end of the war and the sudden death of David Nathan, his wife Simone Nathan decided to move to Israel, and rented the estate. During the construction of the Auckland Southern Motorway, the section of the estate to the west of the new road was subdivided, and became the suburb of Hillpark. The family ran the estate as a farm, until the land was sold to establish the Auckland Botanic Gardens.

Adjacent to the 64 ha (160 acres) gardens is Totara Park, a 216 ha (530 acres) nature reserve managed by the Auckland Council. The park includes areas of regenerating native bush, recreational spaces and farmland.

== History of the gardens ==
=== 1926–1968 ===
The first concept for a botanical garden in the Auckland region started in 1926, when members of the Auckland District Horticultural Society suggested such an attraction for Auckland. In October, 1928, a report was forwarded to the then Parks Committee of the City Council with recommendations. This was approved by the committee. The committee recommended to put aside part of the Auckland Domain for the purpose. "Since then, very little further has been done". In 1945, Churchill Park was considered.

In the 1950s many sites were investigated for housing a botanic garden. In 1957 V. J. Chapman, professor of botany at Auckland University College, drew attention to the fact that Auckland, alone among New Zealand's chief cities, had no botanic garden. He pointed out that the city could acquire 80 acres (320,000 m^{2}) of land at the Tamaki property of the university.

In 1960 an ad hoc committee was formed to try to find a suitable site and to secure its development as a botanic garden. In 1963, it became clear that land at Tamaki was not feasible. The search continued. In 1964, an area of land in the Manurewa suburb was examined with positive results.

=== 1968–1989 ===
On 9 February 1968 the Auckland Regional Authority acquired 42 hectares of land from the Nathan Estate in Manurewa, and the Manukau City Council bought the remaining 40 hectares of the estate, since the property was offered as a whole. The land was leased for grazing until 1970. Soil tests were carried out. These proved that the area was most suitable for a botanic garden.

A scientific advisory committee prepared the first master plan for the gardens. This was adopted by Council in March 1972. On 19 February 1973 the then Auckland City Councillor, Tom Pearce, turned the first sod. A nursery was established at the eastern end of the Hill Road frontage.

In 1982 the Auckland Regional Authority bought approximately 20.5 ha from Manukau City and accepted from it a gift of 2.2 ha to give the gardens a northern frontage onto Orams Road.

23 February 1982 the gardens were officially opened by David Bellamy. At that time the facilities included a visitor centre, the courtyard, the carpark and public toilets. The plant collections were confined to the southern parts of the gardens.

In 1983 the Sir John Logan Campbell Lecture Building was erected. In 1986 an entrance at Katote Place was constructed in memory of Mr. Harry Beaumont, a former member of both the Auckland Regional Authority and Manukau City Council, and a strong promoter of the establishment of the gardens. That same year the Unitec Horticultural Classroom and an associated demonstration home garden were opened.

A review of the role and activities of the gardens was undertaken in 1988–89 by a working party.

=== 1990–present ===
In the early 1990s a covered courtyard and the Friends Horticultural Reference library were opened. Redevelopment of garden collections were undertaken in the 2000s such as the Heritage Rose Garden, New Zealand Rose Garden and the South African garden. A new significant addition to the garden was the opening of the Threatened Native Plant Garden by the Prime Minister Helen Clark on 29 September 2001. This was followed by another significant development of a new Children's Garden, formally opened by the Prince of Wales on 10 March 2005. On the same year a new Visitor Centre building was constructed and opened.

A biennial sculpture exhibition (Sculpture in the Gardens), showcasing selected large-scale public sculptures, commenced in 2007 running for 3 months over the summer season. Another round of garden redevelopment occurred in the late 2000s with a major revamp of the Edible Gardens into themed rooms and a second stage added to the Children's Garden. From 2010 onwards, a series of low-impact and water treatment/ stormwater design initiatives were added around the garden such as two living roof buildings, vegetated swales, rain gardens and riparian planting around the central lakes.

This location was also used in television series Power Rangers Dino Charge, turned into Amber Beach Dinosaur Museum and later in 2016 changed to Amber Beach Dinosaur Zoo.

In 2024 the Auckland Council spent $12 million on a 1.6ha property bordering the gardens on Hill Road, which was intended to be developed into housing, however is now being developed as an extension to the gardens.

=== Numbers of visitors ===
In the first years after the opening in February 1982, visitor numbers were relatively stable at around 100,000 visits per annum. 1988: 143,000. From 1988 to 1994 a rapid increase took place (numbers counted over the season July to June):.

1988/9	157,959
1993/4	494,634

Annual visitation to the gardens reached 969,000 people in 2009/2010 and has increased to around one million people each year ever since.

== Mission ==
The mission of Auckland Botanic Gardens is threefold:

- to contribute to the community's wellbeing and appreciation of plants.
- to reflect in the range of plants on display the region's benevolent climate, its diverse landscape and its ethnic mix.
- to meet the needs and interests of the community and to inspire and inform people about the importance of plants in their lives and to the environment.

== Research ==
Research in the Botanic Gardens has been mainly directed on identifying plants that are best suited to growing in local conditions. Three panels have been active, on natives, on trees and shrubs, and on bulbs and perennials. As a result of this research a great number of Advisory Leaflets was published, together forming the dossier "Gardening in Auckland – Horticultural advice for Auckland gardeners" (published regularly since 1981), freely available at the visitor centre. Much of the trials have been conducted in the Shrub Trial Garden. Here some extensive collections have been created of Hydrangea, azalea, Deutzia and other genera. Nowadays the advisory work is still continued and the Advisory Leaflets are still updated regularly.

== Plant conservation ==
Auckland Botanic Gardens holds plants from both New Zealand and elsewhere in the world which are threatened with extinction. There are also collections of plant cultivars which are now uncommon in cultivation. Growing these plants enables the gardens to provide plant material for research, education, cultivation and reintroduction back into the wild or commercial horticulture.

The gardens take an active role in plant conservation of threatened New Zealand native plants. A good example is the shore spurge Euphorbia glauca or kakabeak Clianthus puniceus.

== Collection ==
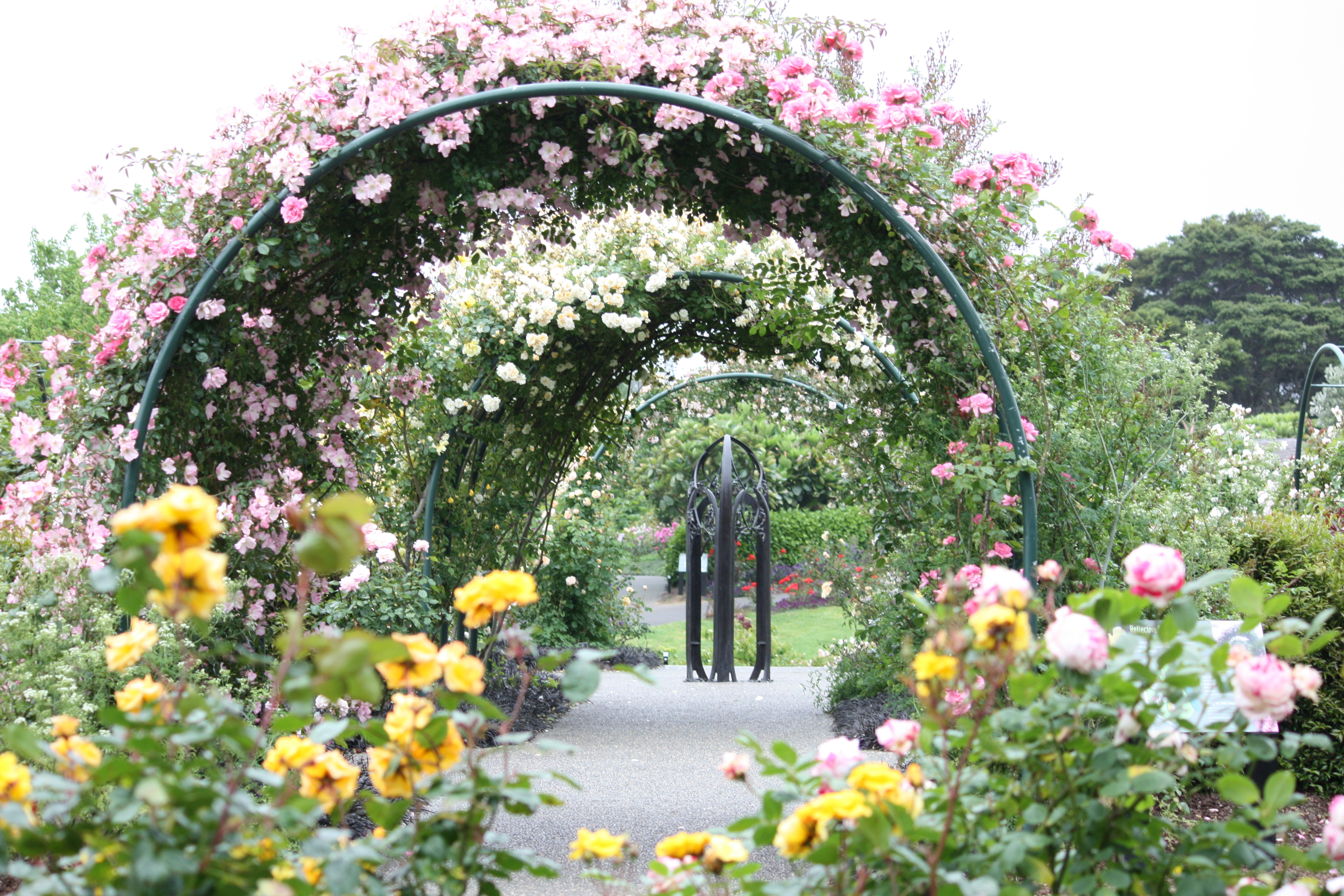
Reflective Rose Garden showcasing climbing roses

Important collections of the Auckland Botanic Gardens include:

- New Zealand Native Plant Collection, in several areas:

- The New Zealand Native Plant Identification Trail: a short walk highlighting characteristics of a selection of NZ native plants
- The Native Forest Trail: a marked walk that leads through a broadleaf/podocarp forest remnant with a total of about 30 hectares. 10 hectares are part of and managed by the Botanic Gardens. 20 hectares are part of 'Totara Park.' The area was cut in earlier times to harvest timber. The forest is now regenerating. There are a number of tracks in the area. One of the tracks is described in a leaflet with information on plants and trees. The flora of the combined area consists of 158 species in total.
- The Harakeke (Phormium) Collection, with a large number of cultivars traditionally used by Maori for weaving.
- The Threatened Native Plant Collection, opened 2001 by Helen Clark, ex-Prime Minister of New Zealand. Here we find for instance fine specimen of Three Kings (Trumpet) Vine Tecomanthe speciosa and of Shore Spurge.
- Native Plant Ideas: ornamental native plants combined in creatively designed gardens.

- Rose Garden: consisting of the Historic Rose Garden (species and heritage roses), Reflective Rose Garden (formal display of floribunda, hybrid tea, shrub and climbing roses), New Zealand Rose Garden (a mix of garden roses with native plants) and Pergola Garden (modern and heritage roses with colourful perennials and annuals).
- The Potter Children's Garden: arranged in 3 parts, the first stage focuses on the relationship between a native bird (kererū) and a native tree (pūriri) with additional native planting themes of coastal, forest, wetland and a maze. The second part has 4 distinct habitats (bog, meadow, jungle and desert) showing plant adaptations. A separate third area contains a classroom and sustainable edible garden.
- Trial Garden: groups of plants are selected for evaluation and research purposes.
- Gondwana Arboretum: groupings of trees planted from the early 2000s onwards which showcase predominantly coniferous trees from Southern Hemisphere countries which once were part of Gondwana.
- Edible and Herb Garden: a series of themed gardens which include the Walled Garden (portage-style garden with brick walls showing different micro-climates), Culinary Courtyard (formal display of attractive and useful culinary plants), Kiwi Backyard (informal garden with a food forest, raised planters, and composting ideas) and Orchard. The Herb Garden is one of the oldest plantings, established in 1979, with an array of herbs conveying their uses, value and historical significance.
- Perennial Garden: bold, creative, colourful combinations of colour, texture and form of perennial plants that are known to do well in Auckland.
- Camellia Garden: a collection of species and cultivars with well known Camellia species of japonica, sansanqua and reticulata, supported with woody and herbaceous plantings of East Asian origin.
- Magnolia Garden: a diverse array of species and cultivars, including a collection of NZ-bred varieties.
- South African Garden: a wide range of southern Africa plants, particularly Cape flora. Significant plantings include Proteaceae, Asteraceae, restios and aloes.
- Rock Garden: two sections with one an eclectic mix of uncommon plants with an emphasis on small perennials, shrubs, bulbs and succulents and another featuring cacti and succulents from the Americas.
- Palm Garden: one of NZ's largest outdoor collection of different palms supported by sub-tropical plantings.
- Urban Trees: shows a selection of small trees that can be successfully planted in private gardens.

There are a number of other smaller collections, for instance a collection of conifers, with a specimen of Keteleeria davidiana and Bishop Pine Pinus muricata.

The database, that lists all the plants in the collections, is available for consultation in the Visitor Centre.

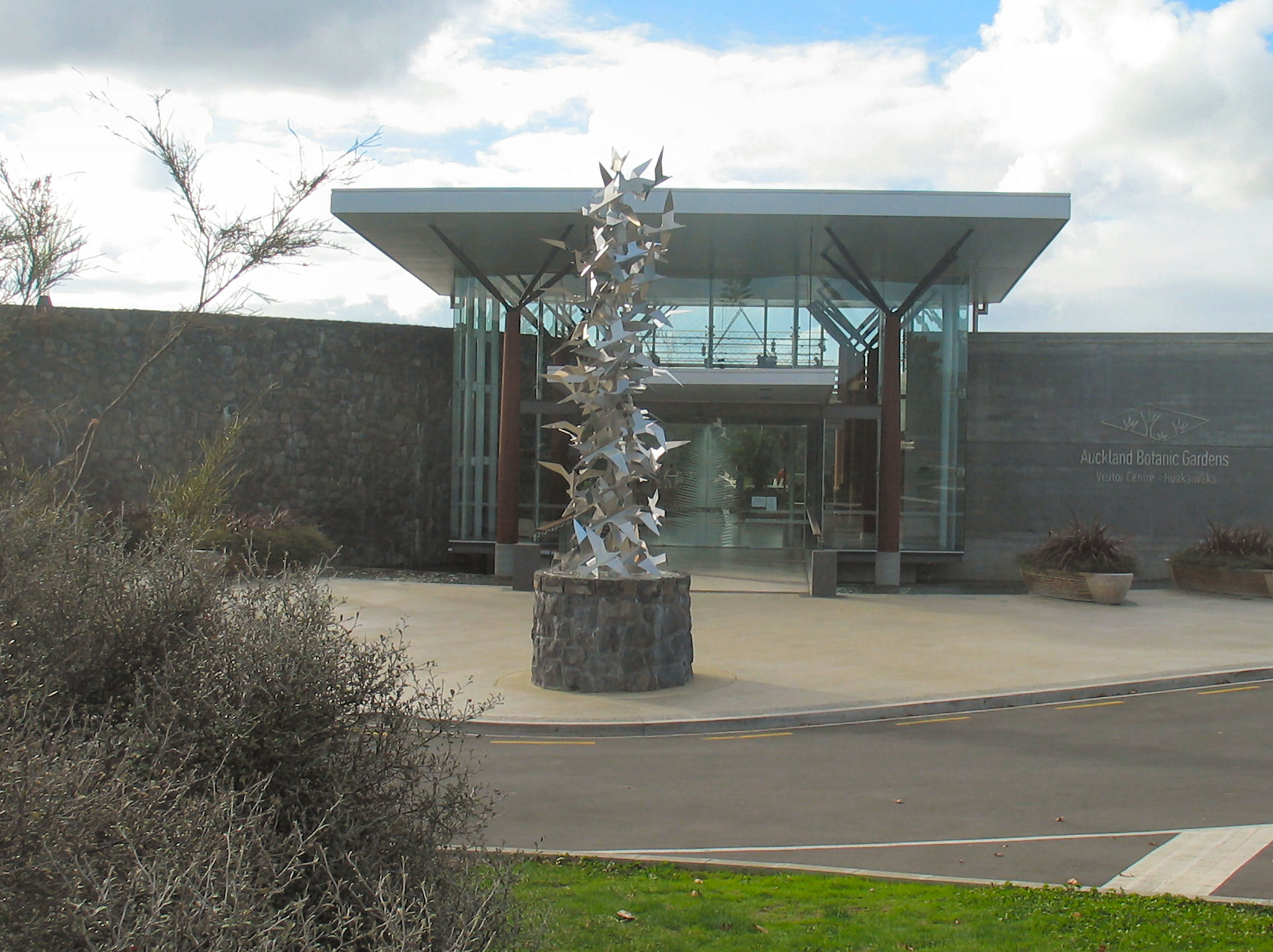
Visitor centre

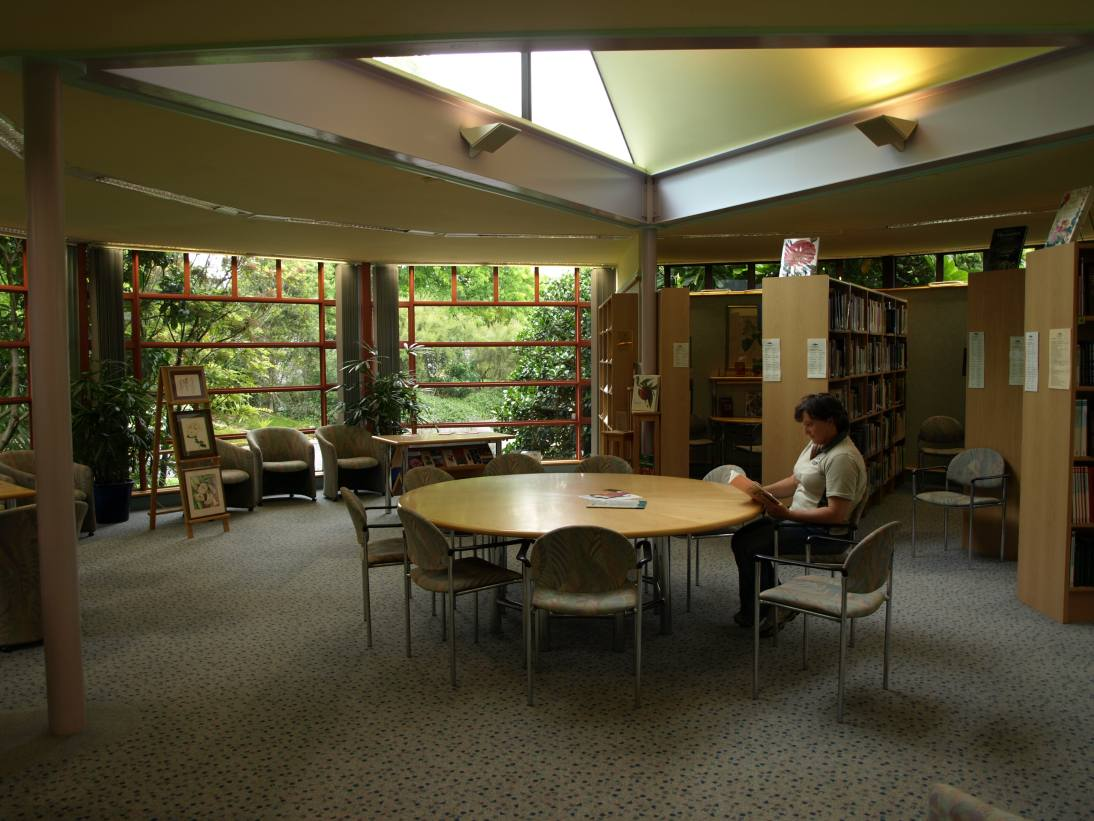
Interior of the library

== Visitor Centre ==
The Visitor Centre Huakaiwaka is a modern building opened in 2005 that houses the information desk, information displays, a café, and offices.

== Library ==
The Horticultural Reference Library is housed in a separate building. The building was opened in 1992 and was funded by the Friends of the Auckland Botanic Gardens. It contains some 2,500 books and a number of horticultural journals and magazines. The catalogue holds about 10,000 items. The library is open to the public.

The huge impact of the activities of the Friends is clearly demonstrated by the fact that in 1989 the library housed only 400 volumes in the Information Centre, that were solely used for reference by staff.

== Ellerslie Flower Show ==
The Ellerslie Flower Show was a very successful event which eventually outgrew its original location at the Ellerslie Race Course. The Botanic Gardens were used for the show for a number of years until 2008, when it moved to Hagley Park in Christchurch.

== Platt Arboretum ==
In 2025, a property in Greenhithe was donated by Rosemary Platt to the people of Auckland for conversion into a new regional park, which is also expected to act as a satellite botanic gardens site in the north of Auckland. The 5.63 ha property contains an ecologically significant arboretum that was cultivated by Platt and her late husband, Graeme Platt, and contains over 1000 rare and special trees from several different countries, including a significant collection of Kauri. While it is yet to open to the public, it is planned that the park will be managed by the Auckland Botanic Gardens and will serve residents in north and western Auckland who are located relatively far from the main botanic gardens site in Manurewa.
