= Ardmore, New Zealand =

- Locality
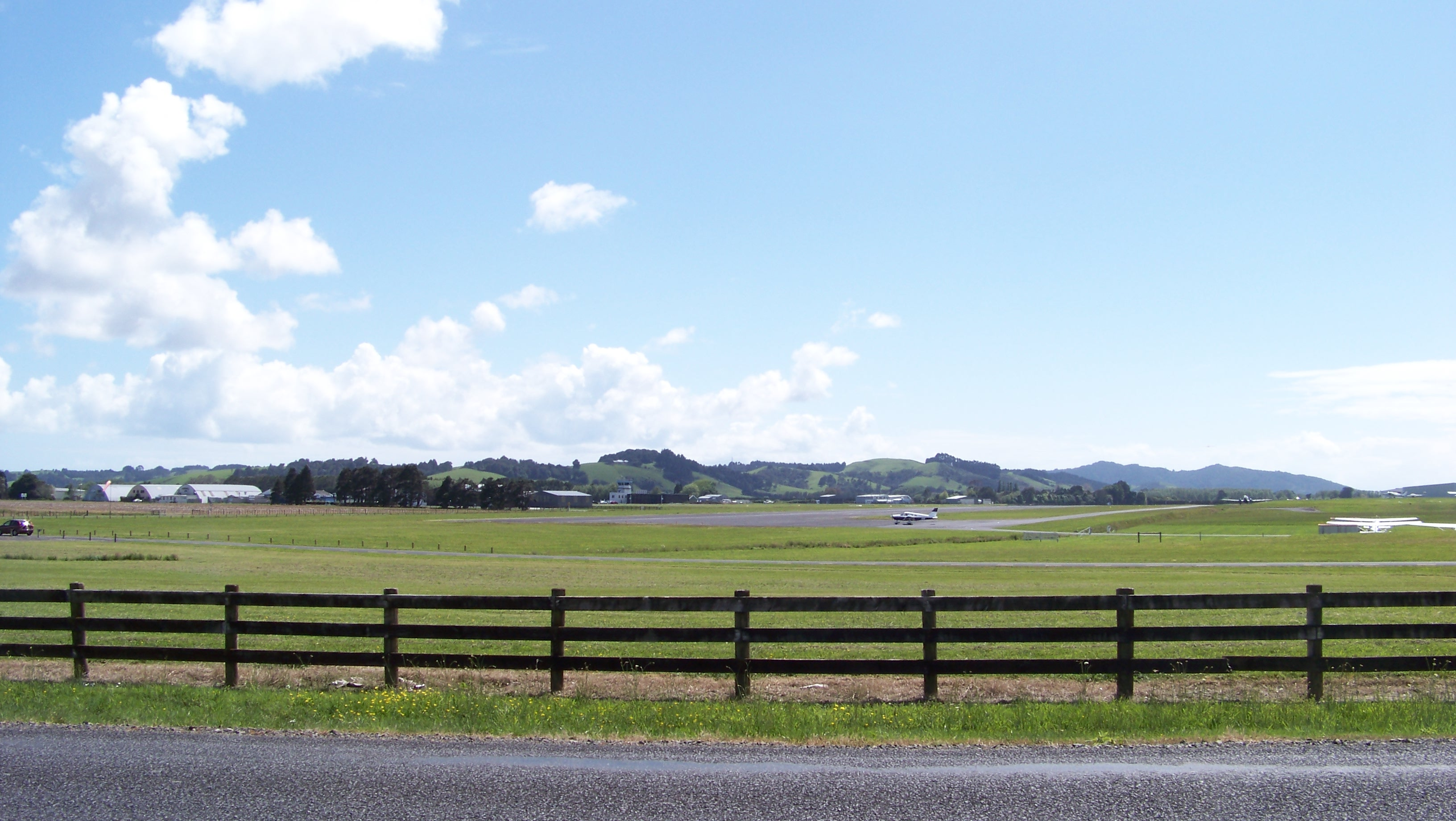
- View of Ardmore Airport and surrounding farmland, backed by the Hunua Ranges.
- Interactive map of Ardmore, New Zealand
- Coordinates: 37°02′S 175°00′E
- Country: New Zealand
- Council: Auckland Council
- Electoral ward: Franklin Ward
- Local board: Franklin Local Board
- Electorates: Papakura; Hauraki-Waikato (Māori)

Government
  - Territorial Authority: Auckland Council
  - Mayor of Auckland: Wayne Brown
  - Papakura MP: Vacant
  - Hauraki-Waikato MP: Hana-Rawhiti Maipi-Clarke

Area
  - Land: 4,427 ha (10,940 acres)

Population (June 2025)
  - Total: 1,400
  - Density: 32/km^{2} (82/sq mi)

| Alfriston | Brookby | Clevedon |
| Takanini | Ardmore |
| Papakura North | | Hūnua |

Ardmore is a large rural locality of Auckland, New Zealand, located to the south-east of Auckland CBD, just 27 km away. Ardmore is in the Franklin Ward, one of the thirteen administrative divisions of Auckland, and is under local governance of Auckland Council.

== History ==
Ardmore's first Church, St Peter's Church, was constructed in 1861. In 1892 St Peter's burnt down and St James was constructed the following year on the same site. In 1961—as part of a centennial for the Church congregation—two stained glass windows were installed.

The area contains Ardmore Airport, which is one of Auckland's busiest airports due to Ardmore Flying School. This rural tranquility is located just to the east of the Auckland Metropolitan Area with Papakura being the closest town (within the Auckland urban area). Ardmore has a state co-educational primary school which provides education for the local children.

Ardmore Teachers' Training College was situated adjacent to the airfield from 1948 to 1974. The college opened in 1948 to help address the shortage of teachers in New Zealand caused by the 'baby boom' after WW2. It was New Zealand's only fully residential teachers' college and during its 27-year history, trained around 8500 teachers. The closure of the college in 1974 was the end of an era and nothing remains at the site to indicate its existence except for a memorial stone.

Auckland University's School Of Engineering was established at the aerodrome in 1948, using old World War II military barracks and hangars. It remained there until 1969, when it moved to a much larger new building in Symonds Street in central Auckland, near the University's other faculties. While at Ardmore, the school offered only Civil, Mechanical, and Electrical Engineering degrees. The school would move from Ardmore in 1969.

The aerodrome was used for the NZ Grand Prix in the 1950s and 1960s before the Pukekohe Park Raceway was completed. Bruce McLaren was a winner there, and the circuit hosted many famous drivers including Jack Brabham, Prince Bira, Stirling Moss and Reg Parnell.

The New Zealand Defence Force's military prison, the Services Corrective Establishment was based in Ardmore until it relocated to Burnham Military Camp in 1995.

== Demographics ==
Ardmore covers 44.27 km^{2} (17.09 sq mi) and had an estimated population of 1,400 as of June 2025, with a population density of 32 people per km^{2}.

Historical population
| Year | Pop. | ±% p.a. |
|---|---|---|
| 2006 | 1,191 | — |
| 2013 | 1,296 | +1.21% |
| 2018 | 1,386 | +1.35% |
| 2023 | 1,323 | −0.93% |

Ardmore had a population of 1,323 in the 2023 New Zealand census, a decrease of 63 people (−4.5%) since the 2018 census, and an increase of 27 people (2.1%) since the 2013 census. There were 696 males, 618 females and 6 people of other genders in 438 dwellings. 2.3% of people identified as LGBTIQ+. The median age was 41.8 years (compared with 38.1 years nationally). There were 243 people (18.4%) aged under 15 years, 198 (15.0%) aged 15 to 29, 672 (50.8%) aged 30 to 64, and 210 (15.9%) aged 65 or older.

People could identify as more than one ethnicity. The results were 74.6% European (Pākehā); 19.7% Māori; 7.5% Pasifika; 13.6% Asian; 1.1% Middle Eastern, Latin American and African New Zealanders (MELAA); and 2.3% other, which includes people giving their ethnicity as "New Zealander". English was spoken by 94.6%, Māori language by 2.9%, Samoan by 0.5%, and other languages by 14.3%. No language could be spoken by 1.8% (e.g. too young to talk). New Zealand Sign Language was known by 0.7%. The percentage of people born overseas was 23.8, compared with 28.8% nationally.

Religious affiliations were 33.8% Christian, 1.4% Hindu, 0.5% Islam, 1.4% Māori religious beliefs, 1.4% Buddhist, 0.7% New Age, 0.2% Jewish, and 3.6% other religions. People who answered that they had no religion were 50.1%, and 7.0% of people did not answer the census question.

Of those at least 15 years old, 216 (20.0%) people had a bachelor's or higher degree, 570 (52.8%) had a post-high school certificate or diploma, and 294 (27.2%) people exclusively held high school qualifications. The median income was $49,100, compared with $41,500 nationally. 195 people (18.1%) earned over $100,000 compared to 12.1% nationally. The employment status of those at least 15 was that 618 (57.2%) people were employed full-time, 138 (12.8%) were part-time, and 21 (1.9%) were unemployed.

== Education ==
Ardmore School is a coeducational full primary school (years 1–8) with a roll of 343 as of July 2026.

== Climate ==
Climate data for Ardmore (1991–2020 normals, extremes 1969–present)
| Month | Jan | Feb | Mar | Apr | May | Jun | Jul | Aug | Sep | Oct | Nov | Dec | Year |
|---|---|---|---|---|---|---|---|---|---|---|---|---|---|
| Record high °C (°F) | 31.5 (88.7) | 31.2 (88.2) | 30.0 (86.0) | 27.6 (81.7) | 24.1 (75.4) | 22.9 (73.2) | 19.8 (67.6) | 21.9 (71.4) | 22.0 (71.6) | 24.2 (75.6) | 28.0 (82.4) | 32.8 (91.0) | 32.8 (91.0) |
| Mean maximum °C (°F) | 28.3 (82.9) | 28.5 (83.3) | 27.2 (81.0) | 24.9 (76.8) | 21.7 (71.1) | 19.5 (67.1) | 18.2 (64.8) | 18.3 (64.9) | 20.1 (68.2) | 21.7 (71.1) | 24.0 (75.2) | 26.7 (80.1) | 29.1 (84.4) |
| Mean daily maximum °C (°F) | 24.8 (76.6) | 25.4 (77.7) | 23.8 (74.8) | 21.1 (70.0) | 18.4 (65.1) | 15.9 (60.6) | 15.2 (59.4) | 15.7 (60.3) | 17.1 (62.8) | 18.5 (65.3) | 20.4 (68.7) | 22.8 (73.0) | 19.9 (67.9) |
| Daily mean °C (°F) | 19.0 (66.2) | 19.5 (67.1) | 17.8 (64.0) | 15.5 (59.9) | 13.3 (55.9) | 11.1 (52.0) | 10.3 (50.5) | 10.7 (51.3) | 12.3 (54.1) | 13.8 (56.8) | 15.4 (59.7) | 17.7 (63.9) | 14.7 (58.5) |
| Mean daily minimum °C (°F) | 13.2 (55.8) | 13.6 (56.5) | 11.8 (53.2) | 9.9 (49.8) | 8.1 (46.6) | 6.2 (43.2) | 5.4 (41.7) | 5.7 (42.3) | 7.5 (45.5) | 9.1 (48.4) | 10.3 (50.5) | 12.6 (54.7) | 9.5 (49.0) |
| Mean minimum °C (°F) | 7.6 (45.7) | 7.6 (45.7) | 5.8 (42.4) | 2.9 (37.2) | 1.1 (34.0) | −1.1 (30.0) | −1.5 (29.3) | 0.0 (32.0) | 1.3 (34.3) | 3.2 (37.8) | 4.2 (39.6) | 6.6 (43.9) | −2.3 (27.9) |
| Record low °C (°F) | 5.1 (41.2) | 3.8 (38.8) | 0.6 (33.1) | −1.5 (29.3) | −2.9 (26.8) | −4.0 (24.8) | −4.0 (24.8) | −3.5 (25.7) | −1.9 (28.6) | −1.5 (29.3) | 1.1 (34.0) | 3.4 (38.1) | −4.0 (24.8) |
| Average rainfall mm (inches) | 68.2 (2.69) | 66.6 (2.62) | 80.3 (3.16) | 105.4 (4.15) | 123.9 (4.88) | 140.4 (5.53) | 144.0 (5.67) | 136.5 (5.37) | 113.8 (4.48) | 101.7 (4.00) | 88.6 (3.49) | 90.4 (3.56) | 1,259.8 (49.6) |
Source: NIWA (rain 1990–2016)
