= List of suburbs of Auckland =

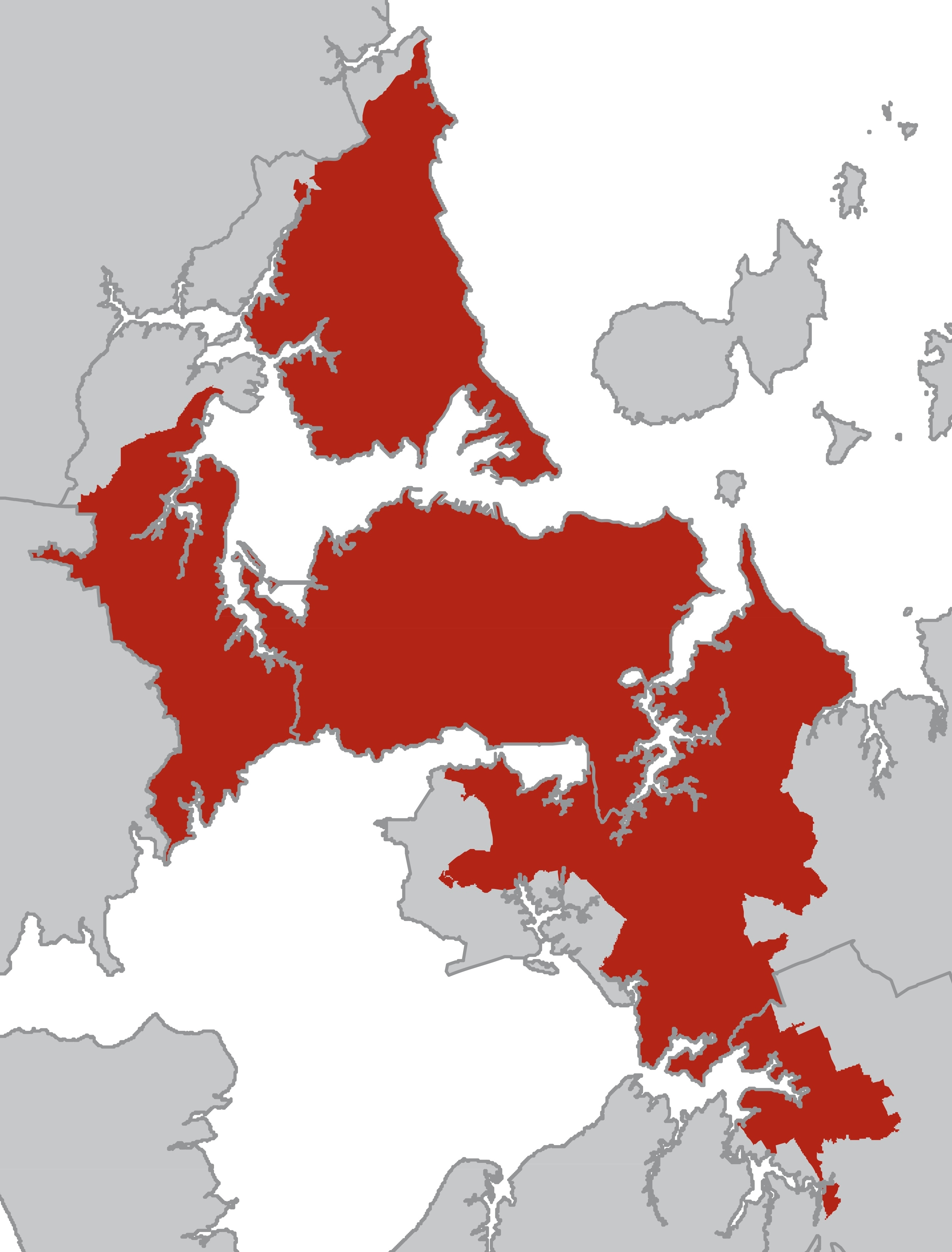
The metropolitan urban limits of Auckland in 2009

This is a list of suburbs in the Auckland metropolitan area, New Zealand, surrounding the Auckland City Centre. They are broadly grouped into their local board areas, and only include suburbs within the metropolitan urban limits of the Auckland urban area.

Suburbs began to develop in Auckland in the late 19th century, with the growth of tram, train and ferry services. By 1945, the towns of Onehunga, Ōtāhuhu, Avondale and New Lynn had merged into the wider Auckland urban area.

The 1960s and 1970s saw rapid development of suburbs on the North Shore, and by the 1980s Howick, Manurewa and Papakura had become part of the Auckland urban area. Current predictions of urban growth show new suburbs developing in northwestern Auckland near Whenuapai, and a continuous urban expansion between Papakura and Pukekohe.

Suburbs within the metropolitan urban limits of Auckland are administered by local boards, and currently split into 17 areas: Albert-Eden, Devonport-Takapuna, Henderson-Massey, Hibiscus and Bays, Howick, Kaipātiki, Māngere-Ōtāhuhu, Manurewa, Maungakiekie-Tāmaki, Ōrākei, Ōtara-Papatoetoe, Puketāpapa, Upper Harbour, Waitākere Ranges, Waitematā and Whau.

== List of suburbs ==
Rural townships and localities outside of the metropolitan urban limits of Auckland are excluded from this list, such as Waiheke Island and the Hibiscus Coast.

Name	Local board area	Ward	Former territorial authority (1989–2010)	Geographic area
Airport Oaks	Māngere-Ōtāhuhu	Manukau ward	Manukau City	South Auckland
Albany	Upper Harbour	Albany ward	North Shore City	North Shore
Alfriston	Manurewa	Manurewa-Papakura ward	Manukau City, Papakura District	South Auckland
Arch Hill	Waitematā	Waitematā and Gulf ward	Auckland City	Central Auckland
Auckland City Centre	Waitematā	Waitematā and Gulf ward	Auckland City	Central Auckland
Avondale	Whau	Whau ward	Auckland City	West Auckland, Central Auckland
Balmoral	Albert-Eden	Albert-Eden-Puketāpapa ward	Auckland City	Central Auckland
Bayswater	Devonport-Takapuna	North Shore ward	North Shore City	North Shore
Bayview	Kaipātiki	North Shore ward	North Shore City	North Shore
Beach Haven	Kaipātiki	North Shore ward	North Shore City	North Shore
Belmont	Devonport-Takapuna	North Shore ward	North Shore City	North Shore
Birkdale	Kaipātiki	North Shore ward	North Shore City	North Shore
Birkenhead	Kaipātiki	North Shore ward	North Shore City	North Shore
Blockhouse Bay	Whau	Whau ward	Auckland City	West Auckland, Central Auckland
Botany	Howick	Howick ward	Manukau City	East Auckland
Botany Downs	Howick	Howick ward	Manukau City	East Auckland
Browns Bay	Hibiscus and Bays	Albany ward	North Shore City	East Coast Bays, North Shore
Bucklands Beach	Howick	Howick ward	Manukau City	East Auckland
Burswood	Howick	Howick ward	Manukau City	East Auckland
Campbells Bay	Hibiscus and Bays	Albany ward	North Shore City	East Coast Bays, North Shore
Castor Bay	Devonport-Takapuna	North Shore ward	North Shore City	North Shore
Chatswood	Kaipātiki	North Shore ward	North Shore City	North Shore
Clendon Park	Manurewa	Manurewa-Papakura ward	Manukau City	South Auckland
Clover Park	Ōtara-Papatoetoe	Manukau ward	Manukau City	South Auckland
Cockle Bay	Howick	Howick ward	Manukau City	East Auckland
Conifer Grove	Papakura	Manurewa-Papakura ward	Papakura District	South Auckland
Chapel Downs	Howick	Howick ward	Manukau City	East Auckland
Dannemora	Howick	Howick ward	Manukau City	East Auckland
Devonport	Devonport-Takapuna	North Shore ward	North Shore City	North Shore
Drury	Papakura	Manurewa-Papakura ward	Papakura District	South Auckland
East Tāmaki	Howick	Howick ward	Manukau City	East Auckland
East Tāmaki Heights	Howick	Howick ward	Manukau City	East Auckland
Eastern Beach	Howick	Howick ward	Manukau City	East Auckland
Eden Terrace	Waitematā	Waitematā and Gulf ward	Auckland City	Central Auckland
Ellerslie	Ōrākei	Ōrākei ward	Auckland City	Central Auckland
Epsom	Albert-Eden	Albert-Eden-Puketāpapa ward	Auckland City	Central Auckland
Fairview Heights	Upper Harbour	Albany ward	North Shore City	North Shore
Farm Cove	Howick	Howick ward	Manukau City	East Auckland
Favona	Māngere-Ōtāhuhu	Manukau ward	Manukau City	South Auckland
Flat Bush	Howick	Howick ward	Manukau City	East Auckland
Forrest Hill	Devonport-Takapuna	North Shore ward	North Shore City	North Shore
Freemans Bay	Waitematā	Waitematā and Gulf ward	Auckland City	Central Auckland
Glendene	Henderson-Massey	Waitākere ward	Waitakere City	West Auckland
Glendowie	Ōrākei	Ōrākei ward	Auckland City	Central Auckland
Glen Eden	Waitākere Ranges	Waitākere ward	Waitakere City	West Auckland
Glenfield	Kaipātiki	North Shore ward	North Shore City	North Shore
Glen Innes	Maungakiekie-Tāmaki	Maungakiekie-Tāmaki ward	Auckland City	Central Auckland
Golflands	Howick	Howick ward	Manukau City	East Auckland
Goodwood Heights	Manurewa	Manurewa-Papakura ward	Manukau City	South Auckland
Grafton	Waitematā	Waitematā and Gulf ward	Auckland City	Central Auckland
Green Bay	Whau	Whau ward	Auckland City	West Auckland, Central Auckland
Greenlane	Albert-Eden	Albert-Eden-Puketāpapa ward	Auckland City	Central Auckland
Greenhithe	Upper Harbour	Albany ward	North Shore City	North Shore
Grey Lynn	Waitematā	Waitematā and Gulf ward	Auckland City	Central Auckland
Half Moon Bay	Howick	Howick ward	Manukau City	East Auckland
Hauraki	Devonport-Takapuna	North Shore ward	North Shore City	North Shore
Henderson	Henderson-Massey	Waitākere ward	Waitakere City	West Auckland
Henderson Valley	Henderson-Massey	Waitākere ward	Waitakere City	West Auckland
Herald Island	Upper Harbour	Albany ward	Waitakere City	West Auckland
Herne Bay	Waitematā	Waitematā and Gulf ward	Auckland City	Central Auckland
Highbrook	Howick	Howick ward	Manukau City	East Auckland, South Auckland
Highland Park	Howick	Howick ward	Manukau City	East Auckland
Hillcrest	Kaipātiki	North Shore ward	North Shore City	North Shore
Hillpark	Manurewa	Manurewa-Papakura ward	Manukau City	South Auckland
Hillsborough	Puketāpapa	Albert-Eden-Puketāpapa ward	Auckland City	Central Auckland
Hingaia	Papakura	Manurewa-Papakura ward	Papakura District	South Auckland
Hobsonville	Upper Harbour	Albany ward	Waitakere City	West Auckland
Homai	Manurewa	Manurewa-Papakura ward	Manukau City	South Auckland
Howick	Howick	Howick ward	Manukau City	East Auckland
Huntington Park	Howick	Howick ward	Manukau City	East Auckland
Kaurilands	Waitākere Ranges	Waitākere ward	Waitakere City	West Auckland
Kelston	Whau	Whau ward	Waitakere City	West Auckland
Kingsland	Albert-Eden	Albert-Eden-Puketāpapa ward	Auckland City	Central Auckland
Kohimarama	Ōrākei	Ōrākei ward	Auckland City	Central Auckland
Konini	Waitākere Ranges	Waitākere ward	Waitakere City	West Auckland
Laingholm	Waitākere Ranges	Waitākere ward	Waitakere City	West Auckland
Lincoln	Henderson-Massey	Waitākere ward	Waitakere City	West Auckland
Long Bay	Hibiscus and Bays	Albany ward	North Shore City	East Coast Bays, North Shore
Lynfield	Puketāpapa	Albert-Eden-Puketāpapa ward	Auckland City	Central Auckland
Mairangi Bay	Hibiscus and Bays	Albany ward	North Shore City	East Coast Bays, North Shore
Māngere	Māngere-Ōtāhuhu	Manukau ward	Manukau City	South Auckland
Māngere Bridge	Māngere-Ōtāhuhu	Manukau ward	Manukau City	South Auckland
Māngere East	Māngere-Ōtāhuhu	Manukau ward	Manukau City	South Auckland
Manukau Central	Ōtara-Papatoetoe	Manukau ward	Manukau City	South Auckland
Manurewa	Manurewa	Manurewa-Papakura ward	Manukau City	South Auckland
Massey	Henderson-Massey	Waitākere ward	Waitakere City	West Auckland
McLaren Park	Henderson-Massey	Waitākere ward	Waitakere City	West Auckland
Meadowbank	Ōrākei	Ōrākei ward	Auckland City	Central Auckland
Mellons Bay	Howick	Howick ward	Manukau City	East Auckland
Middlemore	Ōtara-Papatoetoe	Manukau ward	Manukau City	South Auckland
Milford	Devonport-Takapuna	North Shore ward	North Shore City	North Shore
Mission Bay	Ōrākei	Ōrākei ward	Auckland City	Central Auckland
Mission Heights	Howick	Howick ward	Manukau City	East Auckland
Morningside	Albert-Eden	Albert-Eden-Puketāpapa ward	Auckland City	Central Auckland
Mount Albert	Albert-Eden	Albert-Eden-Puketāpapa ward	Auckland City	Central Auckland
Mount Eden	Albert-Eden	Albert-Eden-Puketāpapa ward	Auckland City	Central Auckland
Mount Roskill	Puketāpapa	Albert-Eden-Puketāpapa ward	Auckland City	Central Auckland
Mount Wellington	Maungakiekie-Tāmaki	Maungakiekie-Tāmaki ward	Auckland City	Central Auckland
Murrays Bay	Hibiscus and Bays	Albany ward	North Shore City	East Coast Bays, North Shore
Narrow Neck	Devonport-Takapuna	North Shore ward	North Shore City	North Shore
New Lynn	Whau	Whau ward	Waitakere City	West Auckland
Newmarket	Waitematā	Waitematā and Gulf ward	Auckland City	Central Auckland
Newton	Waitematā	Waitematā and Gulf ward	Auckland City	Central Auckland
New Windsor	Whau	Whau ward	Auckland City	West Auckland, Central Auckland
Northcote	Kaipātiki	North Shore ward	North Shore City	North Shore
Northcross	Upper Harbour	Albany ward	North Shore City	North Shore
Northpark	Howick	Howick ward	Manukau City	East Auckland
Onehunga	Maungakiekie-Tāmaki	Maungakiekie-Tāmaki ward	Auckland City	Central Auckland
One Tree Hill	Maungakiekie-Tāmaki	Maungakiekie-Tāmaki ward	Auckland City	Central Auckland
Ōpaheke	Papakura	Manurewa-Papakura ward	Papakura District	South Auckland
Ōrākei	Ōrākei	Ōrākei ward	Auckland City	Central Auckland
Oranga	Maungakiekie-Tāmaki	Maungakiekie-Tāmaki ward	Auckland City	Central Auckland
Oratia	Waitākere Ranges	Waitākere ward	Waitakere City	West Auckland
Ōtāhuhu	Māngere-Ōtāhuhu	Manukau ward	Auckland City	South Auckland, Central Auckland
Ōtara	Ōtara-Papatoetoe	Manukau ward	Manukau City	South Auckland
Oteha	Upper Harbour	Albany ward	North Shore City	North Shore
Ōwairaka	Albert-Eden	Albert-Eden-Puketāpapa ward	Auckland City	Central Auckland
Pahurehure	Papakura	Manurewa-Papakura ward	Papakura District	South Auckland
Pakuranga	Howick	Howick ward	Manukau City	East Auckland
Pakuranga Heights	Howick	Howick ward	Manukau City	East Auckland
Panmure	Maungakiekie-Tāmaki	Maungakiekie-Tāmaki ward	Auckland City	Central Auckland
Papakura	Papakura	Manurewa-Papakura ward	Papakura District	South Auckland
Papatoetoe	Ōtara-Papatoetoe	Manukau ward	Manukau City	South Auckland
Parnell	Waitematā	Waitematā and Gulf ward	Auckland City	Central Auckland
Penrose	Maungakiekie-Tāmaki	Maungakiekie-Tāmaki ward	Auckland City	Central Auckland
Pinehill	Upper Harbour	Albany ward	North Shore City	North Shore
Point Chevalier	Albert-Eden	Albert-Eden-Puketāpapa ward	Auckland City	Central Auckland
Point England	Maungakiekie-Tāmaki	Maungakiekie-Tāmaki ward	Auckland City	Central Auckland
Ponsonby	Waitematā	Waitematā and Gulf ward	Auckland City	Central Auckland
Randwick Park	Manurewa	Manurewa-Papakura ward	Manukau City, Papakura District	South Auckland
Rānui	Henderson-Massey	Waitākere ward	Waitakere City	West Auckland
Red Hill	Papakura	Manurewa-Papakura ward	Papakura District	South Auckland
Remuera	Ōrākei	Ōrākei ward	Auckland City	Central Auckland
Rosebank	Whau	Whau ward	Auckland City	West Auckland, Central Auckland
Rosedale	Upper Harbour	Albany ward	North Shore City	North Shore
Rosehill	Papakura	Manurewa-Papakura ward	Papakura District	South Auckland
Rothesay Bay	Hibiscus and Bays	Albany ward	North Shore City	East Coast Bays, North Shore
Royal Heights	Henderson-Massey	Waitākere ward	Waitakere City	West Auckland
Royal Oak	Maungakiekie-Tāmaki	Maungakiekie-Tāmaki ward	Auckland City	Central Auckland
Saint Heliers	Ōrākei	Ōrākei ward	Auckland City	Central Auckland
Saint Marys Bay	Waitematā	Waitematā and Gulf ward	Auckland City	Central Auckland
Sandringham	Albert-Eden	Albert-Eden-Puketāpapa ward	Auckland City	Central Auckland
Schnapper Rock	Upper Harbour	Albany ward	North Shore City	North Shore
Shamrock Park	Howick	Howick ward	Manukau City	East Auckland
Shelly Park	Howick	Howick ward	Manukau City	East Auckland
Stanley Point	Devonport-Takapuna	North Shore ward	North Shore City	North Shore
Somerville	Howick	Howick ward	Manukau City	East Auckland
Southdown	Maungakiekie-Tāmaki	Maungakiekie-Tāmaki ward	Auckland City	Central Auckland
Sunnyhills	Howick	Howick ward	Manukau City	East Auckland
Sunnynook	Devonport-Takapuna	North Shore ward	North Shore City	North Shore
Sunnyvale	Henderson-Massey	Waitākere ward	Waitakere City	West Auckland
Swanson	Waitākere Ranges	Waitākere ward	Waitakere City	West Auckland
St Lukes	Albert-Eden	Albert-Eden-Puketāpapa ward	Auckland City	Central Auckland
St Johns	Ōrākei	Ōrākei ward	Auckland City	Central Auckland
Stonefields	Ōrākei	Ōrākei ward	Auckland City	Central Auckland
Takanini	Papakura	Manurewa-Papakura ward	Papakura District	South Auckland
Takapuna	Devonport-Takapuna	North Shore ward	North Shore City	North Shore
Tāmaki	Maungakiekie-Tāmaki	Maungakiekie-Tāmaki ward	Auckland City	Central Auckland
Te Atatū Peninsula	Henderson-Massey	Waitākere ward	Waitakere City	West Auckland
Te Atatū South	Henderson-Massey	Waitākere ward	Waitakere City	West Auckland
Te Papapa	Maungakiekie-Tāmaki	Maungakiekie-Tāmaki ward	Auckland City	Central Auckland
The Gardens	Manurewa	Manurewa-Papakura ward	Manukau City	South Auckland
Three Kings	Puketāpapa	Albert-Eden-Puketāpapa ward	Auckland City	Central Auckland
Titirangi	Waitākere Ranges	Waitākere ward	Waitakere City	West Auckland
Torbay	Hibiscus and Bays	Albany ward	North Shore City	East Coast Bays, North Shore
Totara Heights	Manurewa	Manurewa-Papakura ward	Manukau City	South Auckland
Tōtara Vale	Kaipātiki	North Shore ward	North Shore City	North Shore
Unsworth Heights	Upper Harbour	Albany ward	North Shore City	North Shore
Waiake	Hibiscus and Bays	Albany ward	North Shore City	East Coast Bays, North Shore
Waikōwhai	Puketāpapa	Albert-Eden-Puketāpapa ward	Auckland City	Central Auckland
Waima	Waitākere Ranges	Waitākere ward	Waitakere City	West Auckland
Wai o Taiki Bay	Maungakiekie-Tāmaki	Maungakiekie-Tāmaki ward	Auckland City	Central Auckland
Wairau Valley	Kaipātiki	North Shore ward	North Shore City	North Shore
Waterview	Albert-Eden	Albert-Eden-Puketāpapa ward	Auckland City	Central Auckland
Wattle Downs	Manurewa	Manurewa-Papakura ward	Manukau City	South Auckland
Wesley	Puketāpapa	Albert-Eden-Puketāpapa ward	Auckland City	Central Auckland
Western Heights	Henderson-Massey	Waitākere ward	Waitakere City	West Auckland
Western Springs	Waitematā	Waitematā and Gulf ward	Auckland City	Central Auckland
Westfield	Maungakiekie-Tāmaki	Maungakiekie-Tāmaki ward	Auckland City	Central Auckland
Westgate	Henderson-Massey	Waitākere ward	Waitakere City	West Auckland
West Harbour	Henderson-Massey, Upper Harbour	Waitākere ward, Albany ward	Waitakere City	West Auckland
Westmere	Waitematā	Waitematā and Gulf ward	Auckland City	Central Auckland
Weymouth	Manurewa	Manurewa-Papakura ward	Manukau City	South Auckland
Whenuapai	Upper Harbour	Albany ward	Waitakere City	West Auckland
Windsor Park	Upper Harbour	Albany ward	North Shore City	North Shore
Wiri	Manurewa	Manurewa-Papakura ward	Manukau City	South Auckland
Woodlands Park	Waitākere Ranges	Waitākere ward	Waitakere City	West Auckland
