= Rosehill College =

Location
- 5 Edinburgh Avenue; Papakura; New Zealand; 37.0764°S 174.9346°E

Information
- Type: State co-ed secondary (years 9–13)
- Established: 3 February 1970
- Ministry of Education Institution no.: 102
- Principal: Davida Suasua
- Enrolment: 1,772 (July 2026)
- Socio-economic decile: 5M
- Website: rosehillcollege.school.nz

Rosehill College is a New Zealand co-educational state secondary school located in the Rosehill area of Papakura in the Auckland region. The college opened on 3 February 1970, and is now the largest secondary school in the area.

Located approximately 31 km south of Auckland CBD by road, on the southern edge of the Auckland metropolitan area, the college admits students residing on the western side of the Southern Auckland Railway Line in Papakura. It caters to the Rosehill, Pahurehure, and Opaheke area as well as students from surrounding rural areas including Te Hihi, Karaka, Drury, Ponga, Runciman, Ramarama, Ararimu, Kingseat, Waiau Pa, and Clark's Beach. The campus is also situated next to Rosehill Intermediate.

== History ==
The school opened on Tuesday, 3 February 1970 with 180 students and 9 teachers. As the Papakura area was overtaken by Auckland's urban sprawl the school's roll increased exponentially.

The school was officially opened by the mayor of Papakura, Mr. A Campbell, who had previously worked as Principal of nearby Papakura High School.

The foundation principal was Eric Jerkovich, who was honoured in the 1985 Queen's Birthday Honours with an MBE for services to education, shortly after his retirement. The subsequent principal, Tom Robson, responded to criticism of South Auckland education of Pasifika by Sefulu Ioane, saying Pacific Island students chose to come from other parts of Auckland to Rosehill.

== Enrolment ==
As of July 2026, Rosehill College has a roll of 1,772 students, of which 506 (28.6%) identify as Māori.

As of 2026, the school has an Equity Index of 473, placing it amongst schools whose students have above average socioeconomic barriers to achievement (roughly equivalent to deciles 4 and 5 under the former socio-economic decile system).

== Grounds ==
The school has a number of classroom blocks, typically consisting of a series of connected buildings. A Block is surrounded by the hall, offices and staffroom, while X Block backs on to the field, split into soccer and rugby sections. Rosehill also has a library, astroturf and a heated swimming pool.

Rosehill College, like most New Zealand state secondary schools built between 1960 and 1970, was built to the Nelson Two-Storey standard plan. The Nelson Two-Storey is distinguished by its two-storey H-shaped classroom blocks, with stairwells at each end of the block and a large ground floor toilet and cloak area on one side. Rosehill has two of these blocks: C block and S block. B block was also originally built to the Nelson Two-Storey plan, however, the top level was badly damaged by fire arson circa 1995. The block underwent substantial repair and was transformed into a more modern single level technology and science block. A prefab classroom was burnt in 1998.

== Staff ==
Since its foundation in 1970, Rosehill College has had six principals. The following is a complete list:

	Name	Term
1	Eric Jerkovich	1970–1984
2	Tom Robson	1985–1995
3	Bali Haque	1995–2003
4	Graeme Macann	2003–2014
5	Sue Blakely	2014–2022
6	Davida Suasua	2022–present

Eric Jerkovich was the foundation principal of Rosehill College until retiring after 14 years in 1984. In the 1985 Queen's Birthday Honours, Jerkovich was appointed a Member of the Order of the British Empire for services to education. He died on 5 November 2017, aged 91.

Following Jerkovich's retirement, the then deputy principal, Tom Robson, became principal. He stepped down from the position in 1995 and was replaced by Bali Haque. Haque was principal for seven years, during which time the school roll grew to nearly 2000. At different times both Robson and Haque were presidents of the Secondary Principals' Association of New Zealand.

In October 2003, Graeme Macann was appointed the head of Rosehill College. He had been president of the New Zealand Post Primary Teachers' Association in 1999–2000, and has chaired the New Zealand Secondary Principals' Council. He was an inaugural member of the New Zealand Teachers' Council in 2002.

== Houses ==
Rosehill College is split up into six houses.

- Atawhai (Yellow)
- Kahurangi (Blue)
- Manutaki (Purple)
- Pounamu (Green)
- Rangatahi (Black and White)
- Taikura (Red)

== Notable alumni ==
- Keisha Castle-Hughes – actor
- Baden Kerr – rugby union player
- Kieran Read – rugby union player
- Kathryn Wilson - footwear designer
