= Papakura (local board area) =

- Local board area
- Country: New Zealand
- Region: Auckland
- Territorial authority: Auckland
- Ward: Manurewa-Papakura Ward
- Local board: Papakura Local Board

Papakura is a local government area in Auckland, in New Zealand's Auckland Region. It is governed by the Papakura Local Board and Auckland Council. It is within the council's Manurewa-Papakura Ward.

The area was known as the Papakura District until 2010.

The area extends from Drury in the south to Alfriston in the north. Other suburbs include Takanini, Hingaia, Red Hill, Pahurehure and the main Papakura town centre. The landscape includes harbour foreshore, fertile planes, at rolling hills leading to the foothills of the Hunua Ranges.

Within the local board area, there is a theatre, art gallery, athletics track, aquatic centre and other sports venues.

State Highway 1 and the North Island Main Trunk Railway run north to south through the area. Papakura is the third busiest station on Auckland's commuter rail network, and a stop for inter-regional train and bus services.
