= Rosehill, New Zealand =

Rosehill
- Suburb
- Interactive map of Rosehill
- Coordinates: 37°04′40″S 174°56′13″E
- Country: New Zealand
- City: Auckland
- Local authority: Auckland Council
- Electoral ward: Manurewa-Papakura ward
- Local board: Papakura Local Board

Area
  - Land: 155 ha (380 acres)

Population (June 2025)
  - Total: 4,840
  - Density: 3,120/km^{2} (8,090/sq mi)
- Train stations: Papakura railway station

Hingaia	Pahurehure	Papakura
Hingaia	Rosehill	Ōpaheke
	Drury	Drury

Rosehill is a suburb of Auckland, in northern New Zealand. Located to the south of Pahurehure, under authority of the Auckland Council. The suburb makes up the southernmost part of the Auckland metropolitan area, and is located in the Manurewa-Papakura ward, one of the thirteen administrative divisions of Auckland city.

== History ==
Until recently, Rosehill was not recognised as an independent suburb. The previous area was referred to as a small area of greater Papakura, but has now developed into a separate suburban area, stretching from south of Beach Road moving down to Park Estate Road, on the eastern border of the Auckland Southern Motorway and including the area to the west of Liverpool Street as well as conjoining Opaheke Road down to Graham Tagg Park inclusive.

During the major reformation of local government in 1989, the Rosehill area was included into the Papakura District boundaries.

In 2010, after a review of the Royal Commission on Auckland Governance, the entire Auckland Region was amalgamated into a single city authority. As well as the former Papakura District, all other territorial authorities were merged into a single Auckland Council. The suburb of Rosehill is part of the Manurewa-Papakura ward.

== Demographics ==
Rosehill covers 1.55 km^{2} (0.60 sq mi) and had an estimated population of 4,840 as of June 2025, with a population density of 3,123 people per km^{2}.

Historical population
Year	Pop.	±% p.a.
2006	3,303	—
2013	3,279	−0.10%
2018	4,071	+4.42%
2023	4,245	+0.84%

Rosehill had a population of 4,245 in the 2023 New Zealand census, an increase of 174 people (4.3%) since the 2018 census, and an increase of 966 people (29.5%) since the 2013 census. There were 2,115 males, 2,118 females and 12 people of other genders in 1,152 dwellings. 2.0% of people identified as LGBTIQ+. The median age was 31.7 years (compared with 38.1 years nationally). There were 1,050 people (24.7%) aged under 15 years, 951 (22.4%) aged 15 to 29, 1,860 (43.8%) aged 30 to 64, and 384 (9.0%) aged 65 or older.

People could identify as more than one ethnicity. The results were 41.6% European (Pākehā); 29.3% Māori; 21.3% Pasifika; 26.8% Asian; 1.4% Middle Eastern, Latin American and African New Zealanders (MELAA); and 2.1% other, which includes people giving their ethnicity as "New Zealander". English was spoken by 92.6%, Māori language by 5.8%, Samoan by 4.6%, and other languages by 22.7%. No language could be spoken by 2.7% (e.g. too young to talk). New Zealand Sign Language was known by 0.6%. The percentage of people born overseas was 30.2, compared with 28.8% nationally.

Religious affiliations were 32.9% Christian, 5.4% Hindu, 2.3% Islam, 3.1% Māori religious beliefs, 1.6% Buddhist, 0.4% New Age, 0.1% Jewish, and 8.6% other religions. People who answered that they had no religion were 38.2%, and 7.8% of people did not answer the census question.

Of those at least 15 years old, 519 (16.2%) people had a bachelor's or higher degree, 1,545 (48.4%) had a post-high school certificate or diploma, and 1,134 (35.5%) people exclusively held high school qualifications. The median income was $39,600, compared with $41,500 nationally. 255 people (8.0%) earned over $100,000 compared to 12.1% nationally. The employment status of those at least 15 was that 1,692 (53.0%) people were employed full-time, 303 (9.5%) were part-time, and 189 (5.9%) were unemployed.

== Facilities ==
=== Transport ===
The Auckland Southern Motorway runs off the western border of Rosehill, with the main Great South Road travelling through the centre of the suburb. Train and bus services provide the bulk of public transport in the Papakura Town Centre, just to the northwest of Rosehill.

=== Recreation ===
Rosehill has 2 skate parks, and a special education school. With a mixture or rural and urban living, the area is home to Kirk's Bush (a large forestry area), Graham Tagg Park.

== Education ==
Rosehill College is a secondary school (years 9–13) with a roll of 1659. The school was established in 1970. Rosehill Intermediate is an intermediate school (years 7–8) with a roll of 383. Rosehill School is a school for students with special needs. It has a roll of 335. The three schools are on adjoining sites.

Kererū Park Campus is a full primary school (years 1–8) with a roll of 173. The school opened as Papakura South School in 1954. The school teaches some classes in the Māori language.

Park Estate School is a contributing primary school (years 1–6) with a roll of 257.

All these schools are coeducational. Rolls are as of July 2025.
