= Papakura District =

- Former local council territory
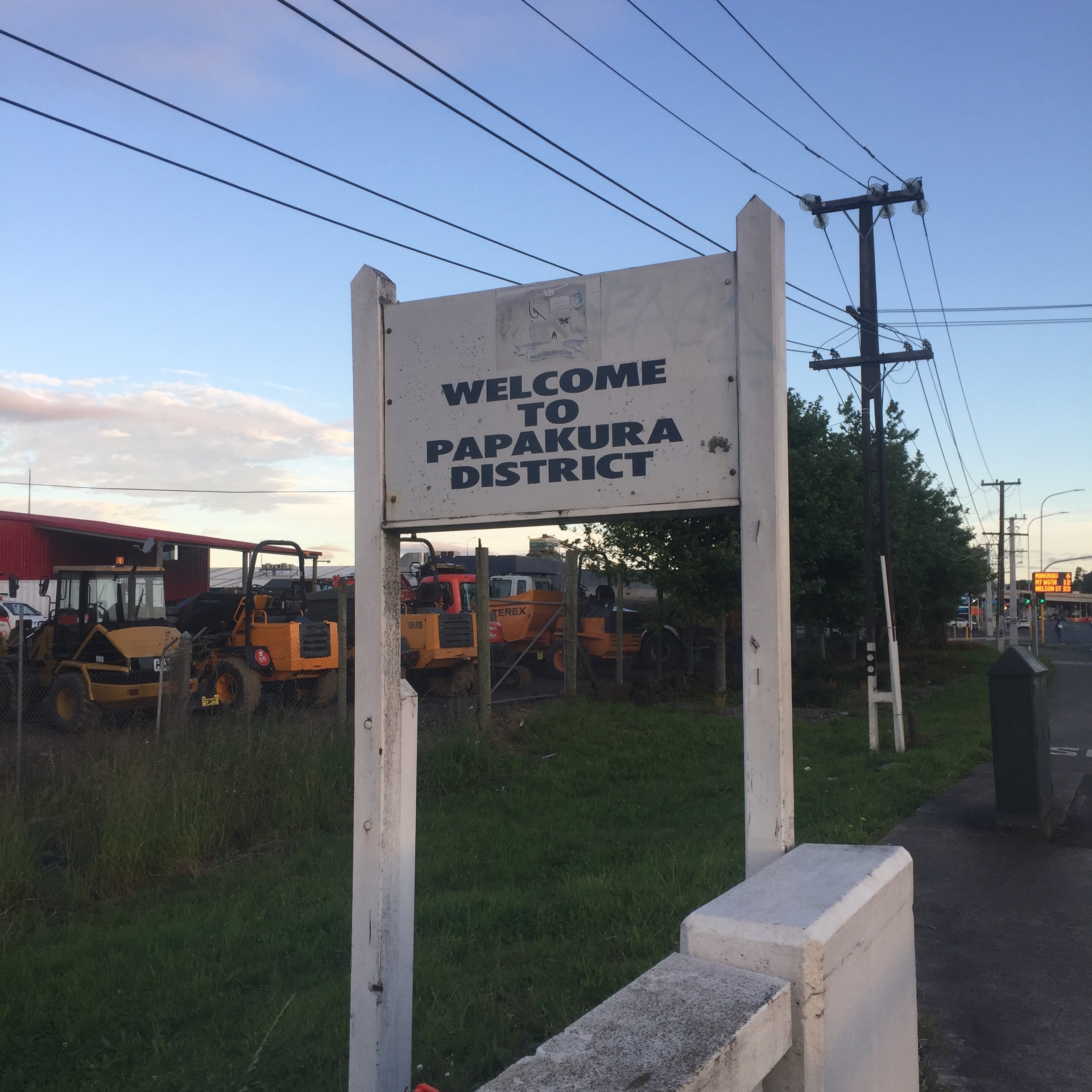
- Sign marking former Papakura District Boundary.

- Coat of arms District Council Logo

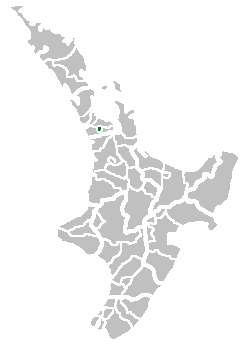
- Territorial Authority location
- Coordinates: 37°05′S 174°57′E
- Country: New Zealand
- Main town: Papakura
- Other towns: Alfriston, Drury, Pahurehure, Ardmore, Redhill, Takanini

Government
  - Mayor: Calum Penrose (final mayor at the time the position was abolished when the district was absorbed into Auckland Council in 2010)

Area (in 2010)
  - Total: 123 km^{2} (47 sq mi)
- Extent was Takanini to Drury; Pahurehure to Ardmore/Alfriston

Population (June 2018)
  - Papakura (central): 28,010
  - Takanini: 10,870
- Council address: 35 Coles Cres, Private Bag 92300, Auckland 1142
- Website: www.aucklandcouncil.govt.nz

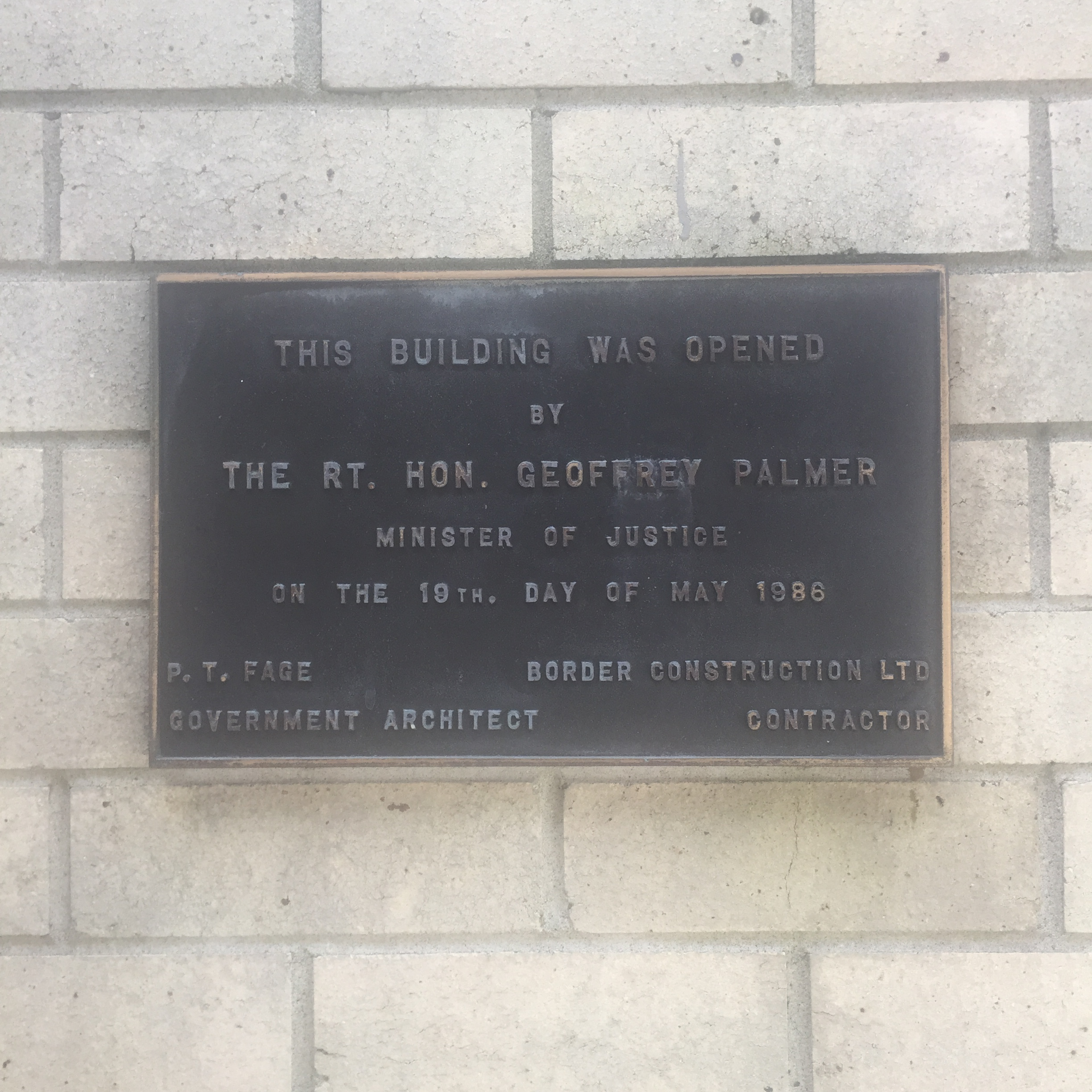
Foundation Plaque, Papakura District Court

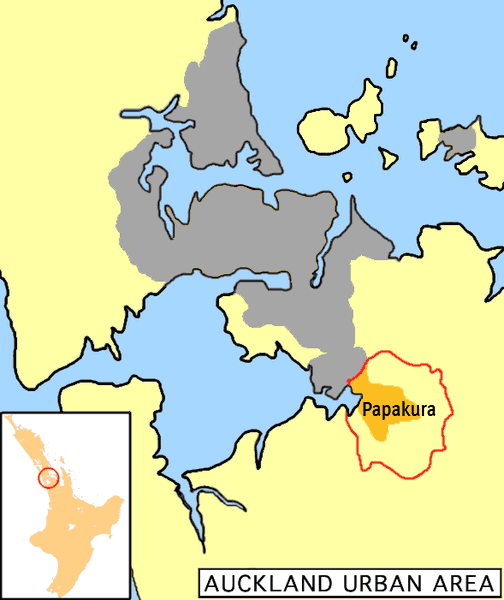
Papakura district (boundary red, urban area orange) in relation to the Auckland metropolitan area (grey)

Papakura District was a local council territory in New Zealand's Auckland Region that was governed by the Papakura District Council from 1989 until 2010. The area makes up the southernmost part of the Auckland metropolitan area.

The area was originally a small independent city, until it became Papakura District in the 1989 reorganisation of New Zealand's local governments, and has now been overtaken by Auckland's urban sprawl. The district is flanked by beaches on the Manukau Harbour to the west, Manukau City to the north and east, and had Franklin District to the south.

== Geography ==
In 2010, Papakura District boundaries covered 123 square kilometres and the centre of the district was located 32 km from downtown Auckland.

The geography of the district encompasses fertile plains, the inlets and foreshores of the Manukau Harbour, and the rolling foothills of the Hunua Range; a relatively narrow but strategically well positioned narrow span of land between the Hauraki Gulf and the Manukau Harbour. Much of the district – particularly in the west – is flat to rolling land. There is extensive peat soil in the Takanini area, which was once a vast wetland and peat bog. In the east, low-to-medium-sized foothills lead out into the Hunua range.

Keri Hill has pastoral lifestyle blocks overlooking Ardmore; Pukekiwiriki offered a strategic vantage point for the indigenous Maori people, but is now a popular suburb; Pahurehure has a harbourside setting on the eastern reaches of Manukau Harbour. Drury is the first genuine country town south of Auckland, and Takanini is Papakura's main industrial zone.

=== Suburbs ===
The district was arranged into four wards during the existence of the Papakura District Council, now the entire area makes up a Papakura Local Board in the new Auckland Council territory.

Ardmore Ward

- Ardmore
- Takanini
- Alfriston
- Keri Hill
- Papakura North
- Papakura

Pahurehure Ward

- Pahurehure
- Conifer Grove
- Longford Park
- Hingaia

Drury Ward

- Drury
- Rosehill
- Opaheke
- Park Estate
- Karaka

Red Hill Ward

- Red Hill
- Ponga
- towards the Hunua Ranges

== History ==
In the major reformation of local government in 1989, Papakura became a district. Prior to that time, a smaller area was known as Papakura City, which was a small city of New Zealand, but the new area included parts of the surrounding rural countryside that had previously been part of Manukau City. After the major change Papakura City became Papakura District, part of the Auckland Region. The whole district counted as part of the Auckland urban area for statistical purposes, forming part of its southern boundary.

On 1 November 2010, the Papakura District Council was merged into the new Auckland Council. All council facilities and services were handed over to the new council.

== People ==
Papakura District's population is estimated to be growing at three times the rate of New Zealand as a whole and is predominantly European. Over 60% residents living in Papakura District belong to the European ethnic group and 36% belong to Maori and Pacific Islander group. The city council is planning for Papakura's population to more than double by 2050.

== Local facilities ==
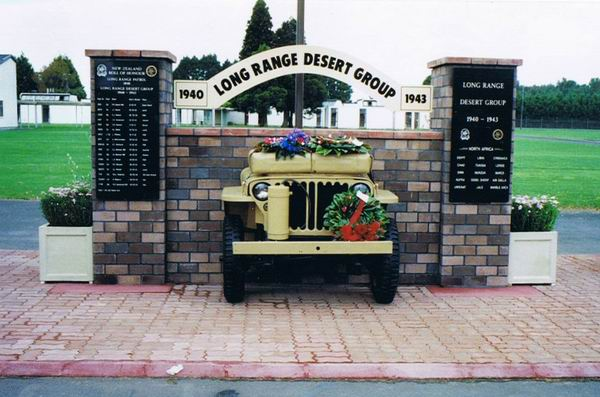
British Long Range Desert Group Memorial at Papakura Army Base.

=== Government ===
In addition to the local council chambers, Papakura is served by a large Police Department; one of Auckland's busiest stations, a District Courthouse, and a WINZ office. In 2004, the Papakura Courthouse acted as the Supreme Court for Pitcairn Island.

==== Papakura District Court ====
The Papakura District Court was opened by the Hon. Geoffrey Palmer, then Minister of Justice, on 19 May 1986. At present, it is home to two Resident District Court Judges. It has 2 main court rooms used primarily for criminal hearings, a smaller court room used for Family Court hearings, a disputes hearing room and Registrar's hearing room for all criminal first appearances. One of the criminal court rooms is fitted out to hold jury trials, but is no longer used for that purpose, with all trials arising out of local incidents being held at the much larger Manukau District Court.

=== Armed Forces ===
Papakura once served a significant military population, but now only the SAS special forces are based at Papakura. Nearby houses were originally Army Homes, but are now privately owned homes.

A significant war memorial is located on the corner of Great South Road and Opaheke Road, where Anzac Day commemorations and other commemorative occasions take place, such as the Armistice Day Centenary on Sunday 11 November 2018.

=== Transport ===
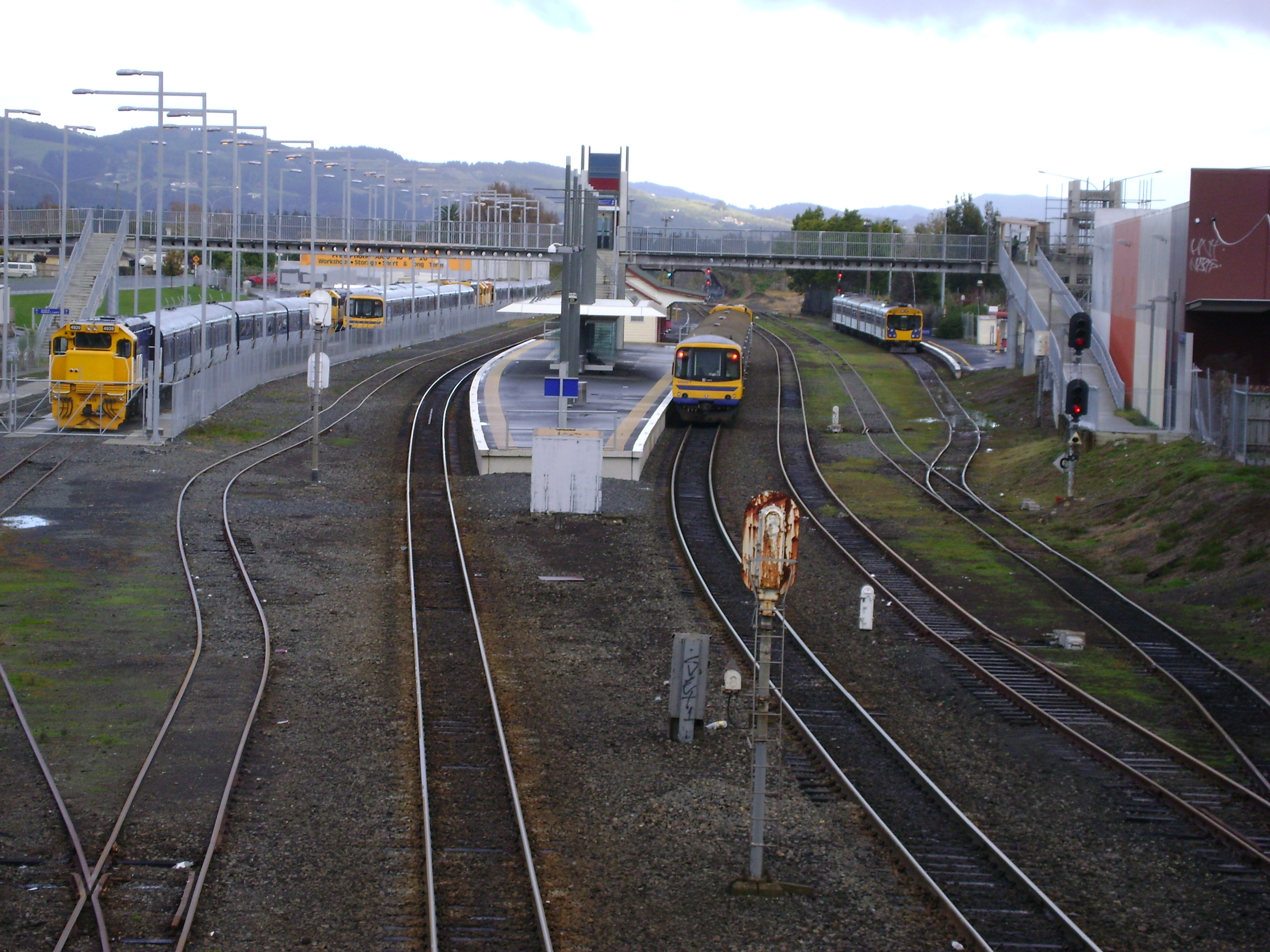
Overview of Papakura station, viewed from Clevedon Road

Auckland's southern motorway and the North Island Main Trunk railway run through the Papakura District and a large airfield is located nearby at Ardmore. Train and bus services provide the bulk of public transport, with frequent trains on the Southern Line between Papakura and the CBD (Britomart). Recent investment has focused on upgrading and refurbishing the region's trains and suburban railway stations, most recently with the opening of a modern station facility at the town centre. Papakura is the final stop for most southbound public transport in Auckland, and Papakura is the third busiest station on the rail network. Drawn by frequent services into and out of the city, rail commuters come from Papakura itself, Franklin County and the northern Waikato. Though the motorway and Great South Road flow relatively freely at peak times, road commuters are affected by the acute traffic congestion as they get closer to metropolitan Auckland.

=== Ardmore Airport ===
Ardmore Airport serves recreational aviators, private and commercial flights. It is the busiest airport in New Zealand based on aircraft movements, and is home to a wide range of innovative small to medium-sized aerospace businesses and popular among the non-commercial aviation sector.

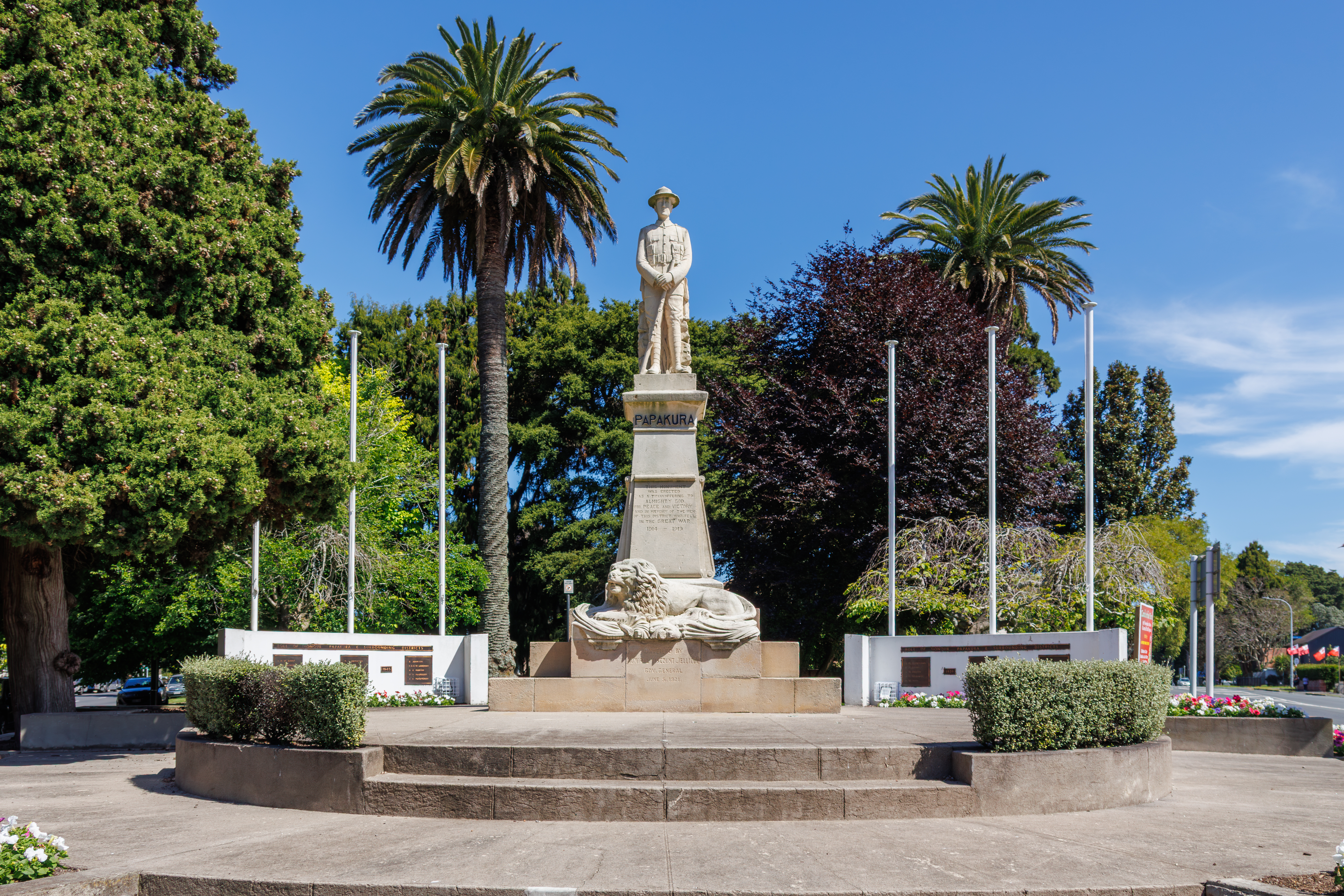
Papakura War Memorial on Great South Road.

=== Recreation ===
Some notable sports facilities include an indoor-outdoor swimming pool, an international-quality athletics track, a sports stadium, and venues for rugby, netball, golf, tennis, badminton, soccer, and many other sports. The council also operates a library and a theatre. Papakura also has a number of skate parks, a skate bowl and an extensive BMX track that regularly hosts major cycling events.
