= Daniel Newman (politician) =

New Zealand politician

Councillor Daniel Newman

Manurewa-Papakura ward Councillor
- Incumbent
- Assumed office 2016 Serving with Angela Dalton
- Preceded by: Calum Penrose

Daniel Newman (born 1976 or 1977) is a New Zealand politician who is an Auckland Councillor.

== Political career ==
Auckland Council
Years	Ward	Affiliation
2016–2019	Manurewa-Papakura	Manurewa-Papakura Action team
2019–2022	Manurewa-Papakura	Manurewa-Papakura Action team
2022–present	Manurewa-Papakura	Manurewa-Papakura Action team

Daniel Newman served one term as a Manukau City councillor, representing Manurewa from 2007 to 2010. He was originally a member of the Labour Party, but later joined the National Party.

Following the 2010 Auckland local elections, Newman became the inaugural chairperson of the Manurewa Local Board. He sought the National Party nomination for the 2011 Botany by-election, but did not make the shortlist. Jami-Lee Ross was ultimately selected.

At the 2016 Auckland elections, Newman was elected to the Manurewa-Papakura ward of Auckland Council, outpolling Cr Sir John Walker and defeating incumbent Calum Penrose. He was one of only two candidates to win election by defeating an incumbent councillor in 2016. He made his maiden council speech on 2 November 2016.

In October 2018, Newman was floated as a potential National candidate for a by-election in Botany caused by the announced resignation of Jami-Lee Ross, but he ruled himself out and Ross later rescinded his resignation.

Newman ran for and won re-election as a councillor for the Manurewa-Papakura ward in the 2025 Auckland elections.
