= Hingaia =

- Suburb
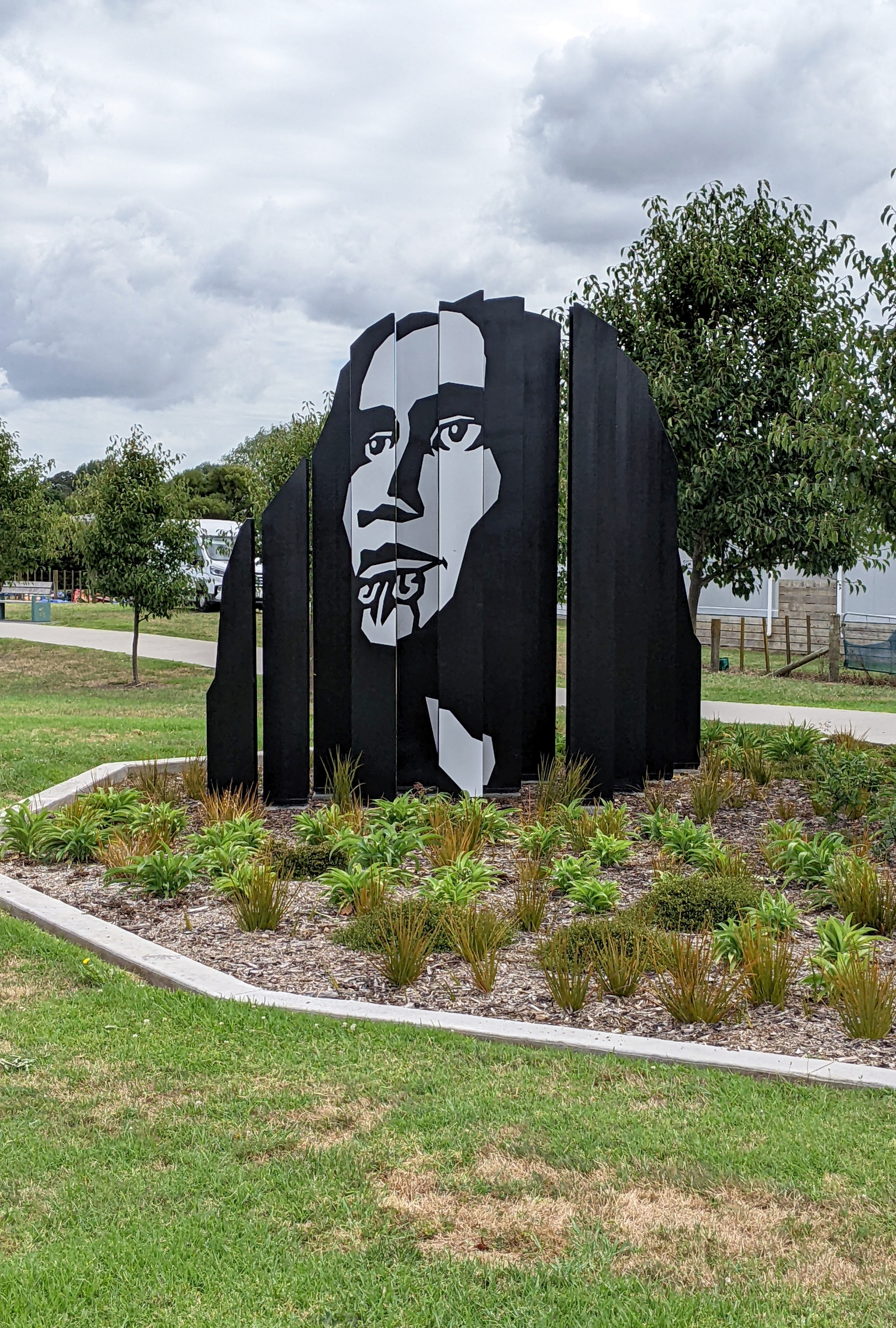
- Sculpture of the Waiohua chieftainess Hingaia at Hingaia Park
- Interactive map of Hingaia
- Coordinates: 37.0801°S 174.9136°E
- Country: New Zealand
- City: Auckland
- Local authority: Auckland Council
- Electoral ward: Manurewa-Papakura ward
- Local board: Papakura Local Board

Area
  - Land: 695 ha (1,720 acres)

Population (June 2025)
  - Total: 6,550
  - Density: 942/km^{2} (2,440/sq mi)

Wattle Downs Peninsula	towards Manukau Harbour	Pahurehure
Karaka	Hingaia	Rosehill
Karaka	closing of the Pahurehure Inlet	Drury

Hingaia is a rural coastal suburb of Auckland, New Zealand. It is located on the shores of the Pahurehure Inlet, to the southwest of the Papakura Town Centre. Hingaia is an official name. Hingaia Stream runs into the inlet south of the suburb.

Hingaia Park contains a sculpture of the Waiohua chieftainess, Hingaia.

== History ==
During the major reformation of local government in 1989, Hingaia was included into the Papakura District boundaries. In 2010, after a review of the Royal Commission on Auckland Governance, the entire Auckland Region was amalgamated into a single city authority. As well as the former Papakura District, all other territorial authorities were merged into a single Auckland Council. The suburb of Hingaia is part of the Manurewa-Papakura ward.

== Demographics ==
Hingaia covers 6.95 km^{2} (2.68 sq mi) and had an estimated population of 6,550 as of June 2025, with a population density of 942 people per km^{2}.

Historical population
Year	Pop.	±% p.a.
2006	642	—
2013	1,665	+14.58%
2018	4,368	+21.28%
2023	5,781	+5.77%

Stats NZ calls the SA3 area Karaka. It had a population of 5,781 in the 2023 New Zealand census, an increase of 1,413 people (32.3%) since the 2018 census, and an increase of 4,116 people (247.2%) since the 2013 census. There were 2,802 males, 2,967 females and 12 people of other genders in 1,884 dwellings. 1.9% of people identified as LGBTIQ+. The median age was 39.0 years (compared with 38.1 years nationally). There were 1,236 people (21.4%) aged under 15 years, 852 (14.7%) aged 15 to 29, 2,706 (46.8%) aged 30 to 64, and 990 (17.1%) aged 65 or older.

People could identify as more than one ethnicity. The results were 49.9% European (Pākehā); 9.3% Māori; 6.6% Pasifika; 41.2% Asian; 2.4% Middle Eastern, Latin American and African New Zealanders (MELAA); and 2.5% other, which includes people giving their ethnicity as "New Zealander". English was spoken by 92.0%, Māori language by 2.0%, Samoan by 1.6%, and other languages by 33.2%. No language could be spoken by 2.2% (e.g. too young to talk). New Zealand Sign Language was known by 0.3%. The percentage of people born overseas was 42.3, compared with 28.8% nationally.

Religious affiliations were 31.7% Christian, 10.2% Hindu, 2.1% Islam, 0.4% Māori religious beliefs, 1.8% Buddhist, 0.2% New Age, 0.1% Jewish, and 8.9% other religions. People who answered that they had no religion were 38.3%, and 6.4% of people did not answer the census question.

Of those at least 15 years old, 1,425 (31.4%) people had a bachelor's or higher degree, 1,968 (43.3%) had a post-high school certificate or diploma, and 1,152 (25.3%) people exclusively held high school qualifications. The median income was $52,400, compared with $41,500 nationally. 984 people (21.7%) earned over $100,000 compared to 12.1% nationally. The employment status of those at least 15 was that 2,475 (54.5%) people were employed full-time, 471 (10.4%) were part-time, and 81 (1.8%) were unemployed.

Individual statistical areas
Name	Area (km^{2})	Population	Density (per km^{2})	Dwellings	Median age	Median income
Hingaia	3.62	2,664	736	972	45.4 years	$43,300
Karaka Lakes	3.33	3,120	937	912	35.2 years	$59,000
New Zealand					38.1 years	$41,500

== Education ==
Hingaia Peninsula School is a full primary school (years 1–8) with a roll of 420. The school opened in 2012.

ACG Strathallan is a private composite school (years 1–13), with a roll of 1238. It was founded in 2001.

Both these schools are coeducational. Rolls are as of July 2025.
