= Ōpaheke =

- Suburb
- Interactive map of Ōpaheke
- Coordinates: 37.076°S 174.949°E
- Country: New Zealand
- City: Auckland
- Local authority: Auckland Council
- Electoral ward: Manurewa-Papakura ward
- Local board: Papakura Local Board

Area
  - Land: 115 ha (280 acres)

Population (June 2025)
  - Total: 3,590
  - Density: 3,120/km^{2} (8,090/sq mi)
- Train stations: Papakura railway station

Pahurehure	Papakura	Red Hill
Rosehill	Ōpaheke	Hūnua
Drury	Drury	Ponga

Ōpaheke is a suburb of Auckland, in northern New Zealand. It is located to the south of Papakura, and 32 kilometres south of the Auckland CBD. The suburb is the southernmost part of the Auckland metropolitan area.

The name was altered to include a macron in 2019.

== History ==
Ethnographer George Graham recorded that the name meant "Of Paheke", which suggests that it was named after a person called Paheke.

Opaheke was originally governed by the Opaheke North Road District Board before amalgamating with Franklin County in 1916. The Opaheke North road district was established in 1886 from part of the Hunua Road District.

== Demographics ==
Ōpaheke covers 1.15 km^{2} (0.44 sq mi) and had an estimated population of 3,590 as of June 2025, with a population density of 3,122 people per km^{2}.

Historical population
Year	Pop.	±% p.a.
2006	2,553	—
2013	2,592	+0.22%
2018	2,868	+2.04%
2023	3,237	+2.45%
The 2006 population is for a smaller area of 1.11 km^{2}. Source:

Ōpaheke had a population of 3,237 in the 2023 New Zealand census, an increase of 369 people (12.9%) since the 2018 census, and an increase of 645 people (24.9%) since the 2013 census. There were 1,614 males, 1,617 females and 9 people of other genders in 1,014 dwellings. 3.2% of people identified as LGBTIQ+. The median age was 32.5 years (compared with 38.1 years nationally). There were 750 people (23.2%) aged under 15 years, 696 (21.5%) aged 15 to 29, 1,467 (45.3%) aged 30 to 64, and 321 (9.9%) aged 65 or older.

People could identify as more than one ethnicity. The results were 55.4% European (Pākehā); 26.4% Māori; 18.0% Pasifika; 18.4% Asian; 2.2% Middle Eastern, Latin American and African New Zealanders (MELAA); and 3.2% other, which includes people giving their ethnicity as "New Zealander". English was spoken by 94.3%, Māori language by 5.1%, Samoan by 4.1%, and other languages by 18.8%. No language could be spoken by 2.9% (e.g. too young to talk). New Zealand Sign Language was known by 0.6%. The percentage of people born overseas was 28.6, compared with 28.8% nationally.

Religious affiliations were 33.2% Christian, 2.4% Hindu, 2.2% Islam, 1.9% Māori religious beliefs, 0.6% Buddhist, 0.4% New Age, 0.2% Jewish, and 6.5% other religions. People who answered that they had no religion were 46.1%, and 6.6% of people did not answer the census question.

Of those at least 15 years old, 516 (20.7%) people had a bachelor's or higher degree, 1,320 (53.1%) had a post-high school certificate or diploma, and 645 (25.9%) people exclusively held high school qualifications. The median income was $47,900, compared with $41,500 nationally. 261 people (10.5%) earned over $100,000 compared to 12.1% nationally. The employment status of those at least 15 was that 1,446 (58.1%) people were employed full-time, 285 (11.5%) were part-time, and 87 (3.5%) were unemployed.

== Education ==
Opaheke School is a coeducational full primary school (years 1–8) with a roll of 601 as of July 2025. The school was founded in 1968.

== See also ==
- Ōpaheke railway station
