= Angela Dalton =

New Zealand politician

Councillor Angela Dalton
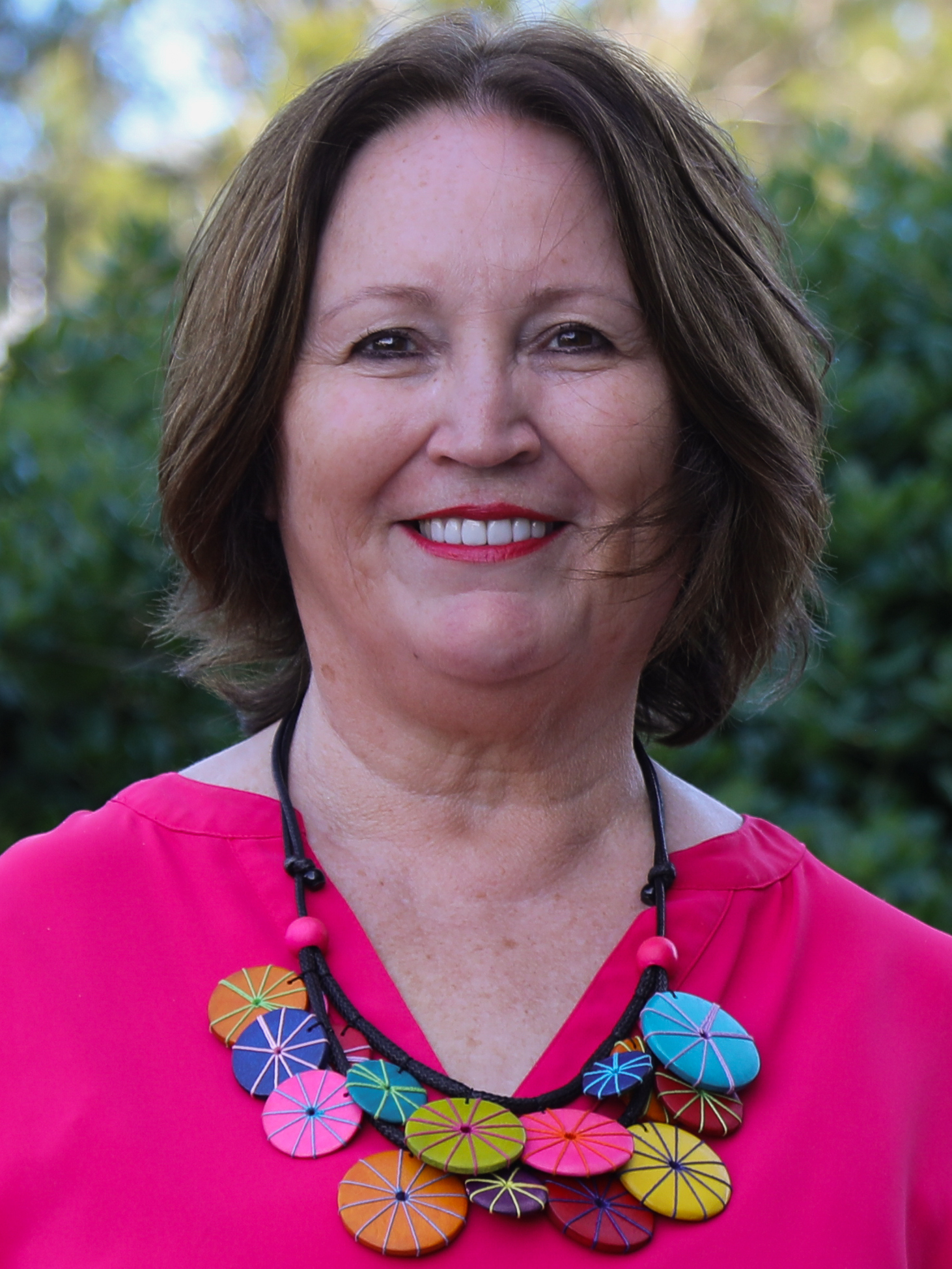
- Dalton in 2026

Manurewa-Papakura ward Councillor
- In office October 2019 – October 2025
- Preceded by: John Walker

Angela Dalton is a New Zealand politician who was an Auckland Councillor from 2019 to 2025.

== Community leadership roles ==
Dalton served on the Weymouth Primary School Board of Trustees and co-founded the Weymouth Netball Club. While living in Wattle Downs, Dalton was a member of the Manukau Enhancement Initiative (MEI) Steering Committee and the James Cook High School Board of Trustees.

== Local government career ==
Auckland Council
Years	Ward	Affiliation
2019–2022	Manurewa-Papakura	Manurewa-Papakura Action team
2022–2025	Manurewa-Papakura	Independent

In 2007, Dalton contested the Manurewa Community Board seats of the Manukau City Council, and won a seat on the board.

Dalton was a member of the Manurewa Local Board from 2010 to 2019. In the 2019 local body elections, Dalton was elected as a Manurewa-Papakura ward councillor running under the Manurewa-Papakura Action Team ticket. Dalton became an independent candidate for the 2022 Auckland local elections, winning her seat a second time.

In December 2024, Dalton announced that she would not seek re-election in 2025.

== 2026 general election ==
Dalton was announced as number 25 for the Green Party's draft list for the 2026 general election. Due to her lower party list ranking, Dalton was not elected to Parliament via the party vote.
