= Pahurehure =

- Suburb
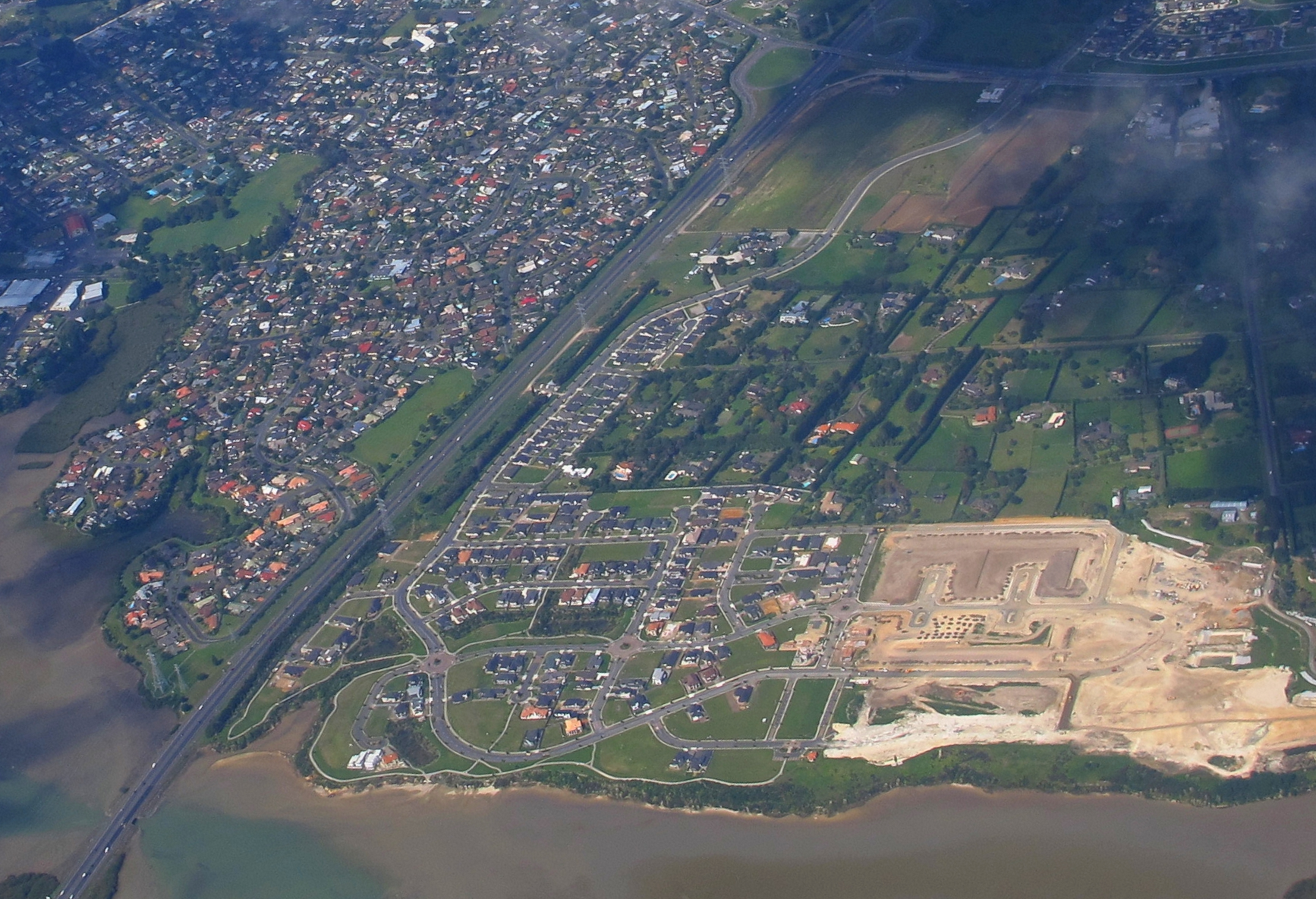
- Aerial view of Pahurehure (left) and Karaka Harbourside (right) in 2012.
- Interactive map of Pahurehure
- Coordinates: 37°04′04″S 174°55′50″E
- Country: New Zealand
- City: Auckland
- Local authority: Auckland Council
- Electoral ward: Manurewa-Papakura ward
- Local board: Papakura Local Board

Area
  - Land: 121 ha (300 acres)

Population (June 2025)
  - Total: 3,700
  - Density: 3,100/km^{2} (7,900/sq mi)

Bottle Top Bay	Towards Manukau Harbour	Papakura North
Karaka	Pahurehure	Papakura
Hingaia	Rosehill	Drury

Pahurehure is a suburb of Auckland, in northern New Zealand. It is located on the south-eastern shores of the Manukau Harbour, under the authority of the Auckland Council. The suburb makes up the southernmost part of the Auckland urban area.

== Demographics ==
Pahurehure covers 1.21 km^{2} (0.47 sq mi) and had an estimated population of 3,700 as of June 2025, with a population density of 3,058 people per km^{2}.

Historical population
Year	Pop.	±% p.a.
2006	3,033	—
2013	3,051	+0.08%
2018	3,264	+1.36%
2023	3,366	+0.62%

Pahurehure had a population of 3,366 in the 2023 New Zealand census, an increase of 102 people (3.1%) since the 2018 census, and an increase of 315 people (10.3%) since the 2013 census. There were 1,707 males, 1,650 females and 9 people of other genders in 1,068 dwellings. 2.5% of people identified as LGBTIQ+. The median age was 36.8 years (compared with 38.1 years nationally). There were 687 people (20.4%) aged under 15 years, 624 (18.5%) aged 15 to 29, 1,575 (46.8%) aged 30 to 64, and 477 (14.2%) aged 65 or older.

People could identify as more than one ethnicity. The results were 60.2% European (Pākehā); 20.5% Māori; 14.1% Pasifika; 22.8% Asian; 2.1% Middle Eastern, Latin American and African New Zealanders (MELAA); and 1.8% other, which includes people giving their ethnicity as "New Zealander". English was spoken by 94.5%, Māori language by 4.7%, Samoan by 3.7%, and other languages by 20.8%. 2.1% were too young to speak any language. New Zealand Sign Language was known by 0.4%. The percentage of people born overseas was 29.0, compared with 28.8% nationally.

Religious affiliations were 37.2% Christian, 5.0% Hindu, 0.6% Islam, 1.1% Māori religious beliefs, 0.7% Buddhist, 0.4% New Age, 0.3% Jewish, and 6.9% other religions. People who answered that they had no religion were 42.6%, and 5.5% of people did not answer the census question.

Of those at least 15 years old, 537 (20.0%) people had a bachelor's or higher degree, 1,368 (51.1%) had a post-high school certificate or diploma, and 768 (28.7%) people exclusively held high school qualifications. The median income was $47,100, compared with $41,500 nationally. 339 people (12.7%) earned over $100,000 compared to 12.1% nationally. The employment status of those at least 15 was that 1,482 (55.3%) people were employed full-time, 294 (11.0%) were part-time, and 93 (3.5%) were unemployed.

== History ==
Recently, Pahurehure became recognised as an independent suburb. The previous area was referred to as a small area within Papakura, but has now developed into a suburban area, stretching from north of Beach Road moving up to Ray Small Park on the eastern border and including the entire peninsula located on the western side of the southern motorway.

During the major reformation of local government in 1989, the Pahurehure area was included into the Papakura District boundaries.

In 2010, after a review of the Royal Commission on Auckland Governance, the entire Auckland Region was amalgamated into a single city authority. As well as the former Papakura District, all other territorial authorities were merged into a single Auckland Council. The suburb of Pahurehure is part of the Papakura Local Board within the Manurewa-Papakura ward.

== Facilities ==
=== Housing ===
Pahurehure has several modern suburban styled houses. The area is similar to the nearby suburb of Rosehill, and is known as the picturesque area of the district. The surrounding areas in Hingaia and Karaka has been heavily constructed into housing developments which has increased the local property values in Pahurehure.

=== Transport ===
Auckland's southern motorway runs straight through Pahurehure, with the main Papakura on and off ramps in the area also. Train and bus services provide the bulk of public transport in the Papakura Town Centre, a 5-minute drive away.

The Southern Path runs alongside the southern motorway which provides cycle and foot links from Takanini to Papakura and neighbouring suburbs. The shared path opened in 2021 as part of the Southern Corridor motorway upgrade.

The Te Mara O Hine footbridge extends over the southern motorway and provides a pedestrian link between Pahurehure and the Karaka Harbourside subdivision.

=== Recreation ===
Ray Small Park serves the local children and sports teams in Pahurehure and Papakura. Also the Pahurehure Peninsula is right on the Manukau Harbour, which has boat access in the local area.

== Education ==
St Mary's Catholic School is a state-integrated coeducational contributing primary school (years 1–6) with a roll of 367 as of October 2025. The school opened in 1954.
