= Red Hill, New Zealand =

Red Hill
- Suburb
- Interactive map of Red Hill
- Coordinates: 37°04′18″S 174°58′37″E
- Country: New Zealand
- City: Auckland
- Local authority: Auckland Council
- Electoral ward: Manurewa-Papakura ward
- Local board: Papakura Local Board

Area
  - Land: 99 ha (240 acres)

Population (June 2025)
  - Total: 2,860
  - Density: 2,900/km^{2} (7,500/sq mi)

| Papakura | Keri Hill | Native Forest |
| Papakura | Red Hill | Hunua Ranges |
| Ōpaheke | Ponga | Hūnua |

Red Hill is a suburb of Auckland, in northern New Zealand. Located 34 kilometres (21 mi) to the southeast of Auckland CBD, under authority of the Auckland Council. The suburban area of Red Hill makes up one of the southernmost parts of the Auckland metropolitan area, however the majority of the area is rural. The suburb is adjacent to Pukekiwiriki, an ancient volcano and Pā. Red Hill is located in the Manurewa-Papakura ward, one of the thirteen administrative divisions of Auckland city.

== History ==
Red Hill was once a sacred Pā site for local iwi in Papakura. With panoramic views of the entire Auckland Region, it once was used as a lookout point during the Māori wars to see the incoming waka from the Manukau Harbour and movements through the surrounding native forest. Also the soil on the hill was used to grow and contain the kai of the local Māori. The area is known to have rich and fertile soil ever since the community was founded as well as other rural areas throughout the Papakura District.

During the major reformation of local government in 1989, the Red Hill area was included into the Papakura District boundaries.

From October 2010, after a review of the Royal Commission on Auckland Governance, the entire Auckland Region was amalgamated into a single city authority. As well as the current Papakura District, all other territorial authorities were abolished and the entire area was dissolved into a single Auckland city council. The suburb of Red Hill was separated into the urban ward of Manurewa-Papakura, as well as the rural ward of Franklin, under the Auckland Council.

== Demographics ==
Red Hill covers 0.99 km^{2} (0.38 sq mi) and had an estimated population of 2,860 as of June 2025, with a population density of 2,889 people per km^{2}.

Historical population
| Year | Pop. | ±% p.a. |
|---|---|---|
| 2006 | 2,580 | — |
| 2013 | 2,274 | −1.79% |
| 2018 | 2,562 | +2.41% |
| 2023 | 2,655 | +0.72% |
The 2006 population is for a significantly larger area of 2.10 km^{2}. Source:

Red Hill had a population of 2,655 in the 2023 New Zealand census, an increase of 93 people (3.6%) since the 2018 census, and an increase of 381 people (16.8%) since the 2013 census. There were 1,338 males, 1,311 females and 6 people of other genders in 735 dwellings. 2.8% of people identified as LGBTIQ+. The median age was 28.9 years (compared with 38.1 years nationally). There were 699 people (26.3%) aged under 15 years, 672 (25.3%) aged 15 to 29, 1,074 (40.5%) aged 30 to 64, and 210 (7.9%) aged 65 or older.

People could identify as more than one ethnicity. The results were 40.7% European (Pākehā); 42.4% Māori; 32.4% Pasifika; 9.8% Asian; 1.1% Middle Eastern, Latin American and African New Zealanders (MELAA); and 2.7% other, which includes people giving their ethnicity as "New Zealander". English was spoken by 93.7%, Māori language by 11.9%, Samoan by 8.1%, and other languages by 11.6%. No language could be spoken by 2.9% (e.g. too young to talk). New Zealand Sign Language was known by 0.8%. The percentage of people born overseas was 21.2, compared with 28.8% nationally.

Religious affiliations were 34.7% Christian, 1.4% Hindu, 1.1% Islam, 5.5% Māori religious beliefs, 0.7% Buddhist, 0.3% New Age, and 1.5% other religions. People who answered that they had no religion were 47.7%, and 7.7% of people did not answer the census question.

Of those at least 15 years old, 234 (12.0%) people had a bachelor's or higher degree, 1,023 (52.3%) had a post-high school certificate or diploma, and 696 (35.6%) people exclusively held high school qualifications. The median income was $36,300, compared with $41,500 nationally. 150 people (7.7%) earned over $100,000 compared to 12.1% nationally. The employment status of those at least 15 was that 912 (46.6%) people were employed full-time, 195 (10.0%) were part-time, and 138 (7.1%) were unemployed.

== Education ==
Redhill School is a coeducational full primary school (years 1–8) with a roll of 217 as of July 2025. The school was founded in 1978.
