= Drury, New Zealand =

Drury
- Suburb
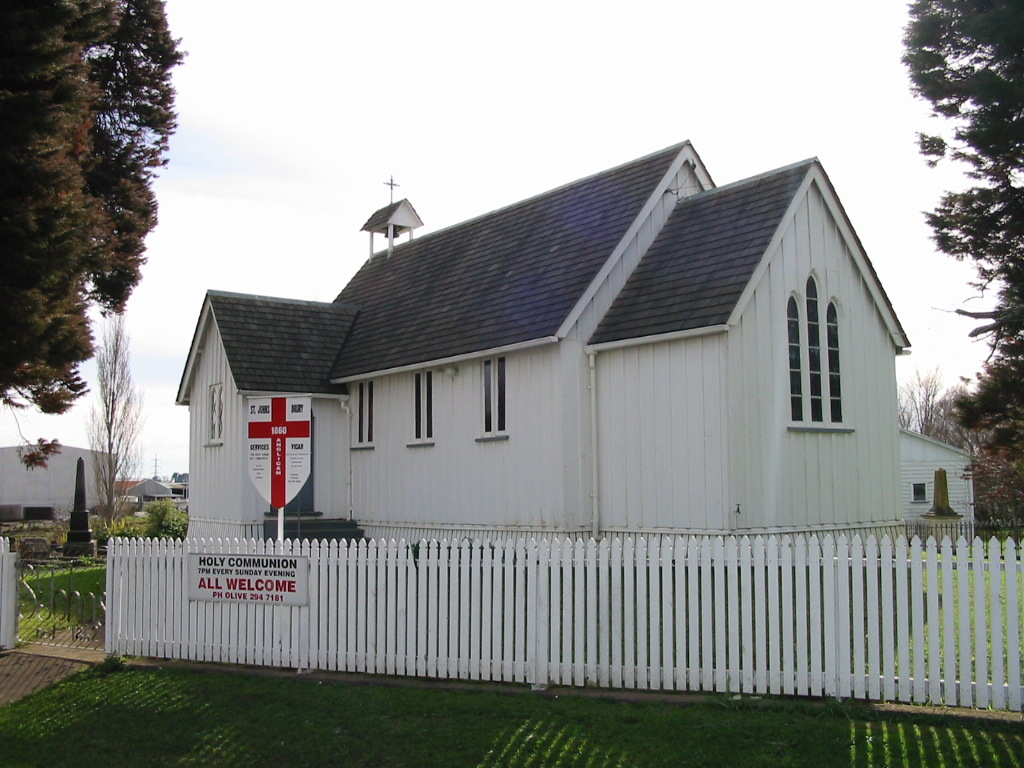
- St John's Church, Drury
- Interactive map of Drury
- Coordinates: 37°06′S 174°57′E
- Country: New Zealand
- City: Auckland
- Local authority: Auckland Council
- Electoral ward: Manurewa-Papakura ward
- Local board: Papakura Local Board

Area
  - Land: 591 ha (1,460 acres)

Population (June 2025)
  - Total: 2,350
  - Density: 398/km^{2} (1,030/sq mi)
- Train stations: Drury railway station Ngakoroa/Drury West station (under construction)

Hingaia	Rosehill	Ōpaheke
Karaka	Drury	Hūnua
Ramarama	Ramarama	Ararimu

Drury is a rural town near Auckland, in northern New Zealand. Located 36 kilometres to the south of Auckland CBD, under authority of the Auckland Council. Drury lies at the southern border of the Auckland metropolitan area, 12 kilometres to the northeast of Pukekohe, close to the Papakura Channel, an arm of the Manukau Harbour.

== Name ==
Drury is named after Commander Byron Drury, captain of HMS Pandora, who surveyed the Manukau Harbour in 1853.

== History ==
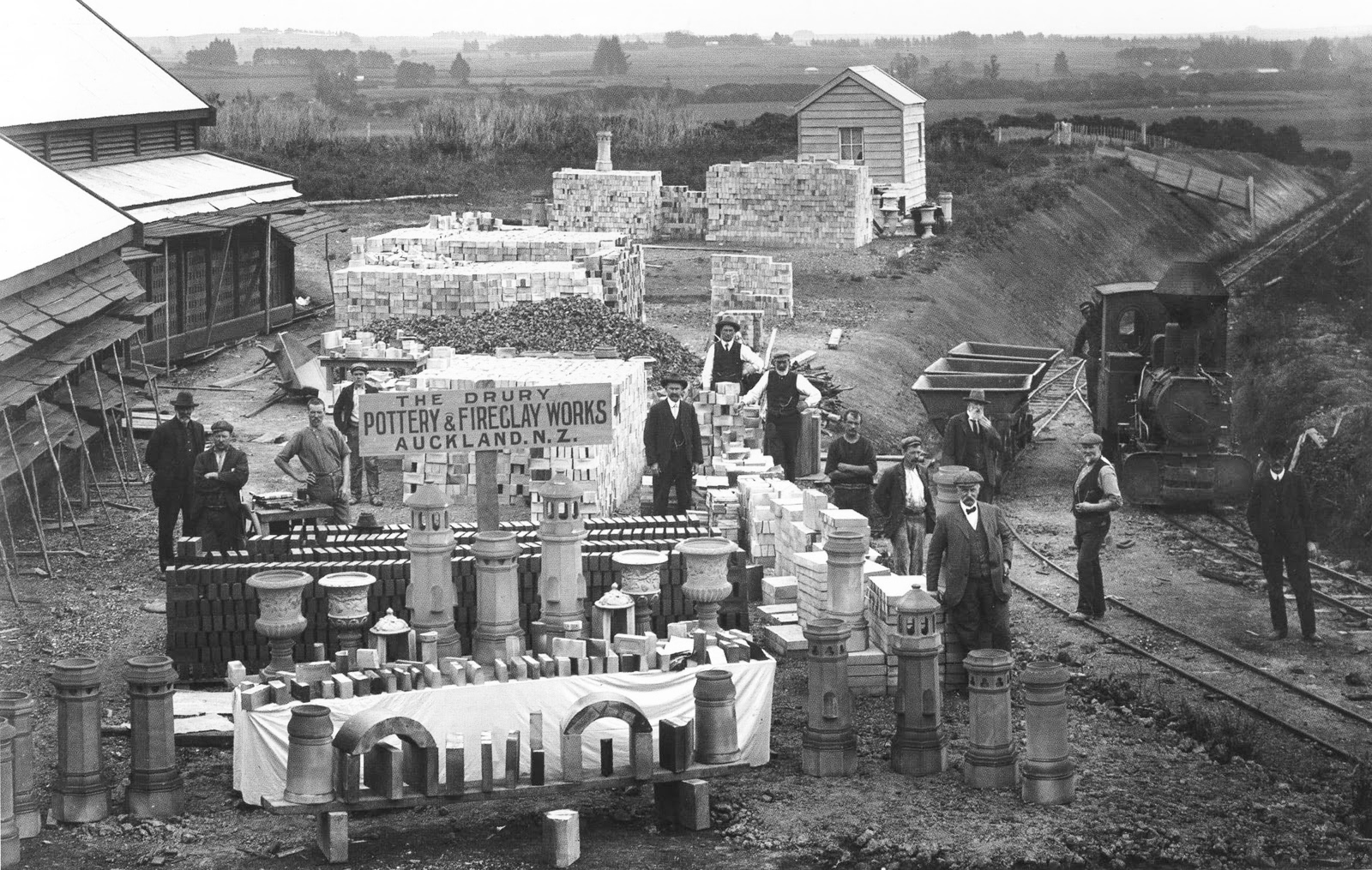
Drury Pottery & Fireclay Works in 1906

Coal mining was a significant early industry established in Drury during the 1850s, and saw the formation of the Waihoihoi Mining and Coal Company in 1859. Continued success with coal mining led to the opening of one of New Zealand's earliest tramways by the company in 1862, consisting of 4ft 8in gauge track with a length of 5.2km, whereby coal was transported to Slippery Creek for shipment to Onehunga. Another early industry seen in Drury was that of an extensive brick and pottery works, linked to a nearby quarry by a tram line at the foot of the Drury Hills. The brick and pottery industry in Drury appears to have operated until at least 1928.

Drury was a significant staging area for British soldiers during the New Zealand Wars, who established a camp in the village under the command of General Duncan Cameron. These soldiers also helped to construct an extension to the Great South Road south to the Mangatawhiri Stream.

During the major reform of local government in 1989, Drury was included in the Auckland Region and made up the southern edge of the Papakura District, along with a certain extent of the eastern surrounding rural areas, previously known as Franklin County. Drury was until recently a relatively small semi-rural area nestling at the foot of the low-lying Bombay Hills. Urban spread of Auckland has rendered it an extreme southern suburb, close to the junction between State Highways 1 and 22, both of which head south towards the Waikato region.

After a review of the Royal Commission on Auckland Governance, the entire Auckland Region was amalgamated into a single city authority, the Auckland Council, in 2010. The Papakura District and Franklin District, and all other territorial authorities in the region were abolished and incorporated into the new council. The town of Drury was included in the Franklin ward, one of the thirteen wards of the council.

== Future growth ==
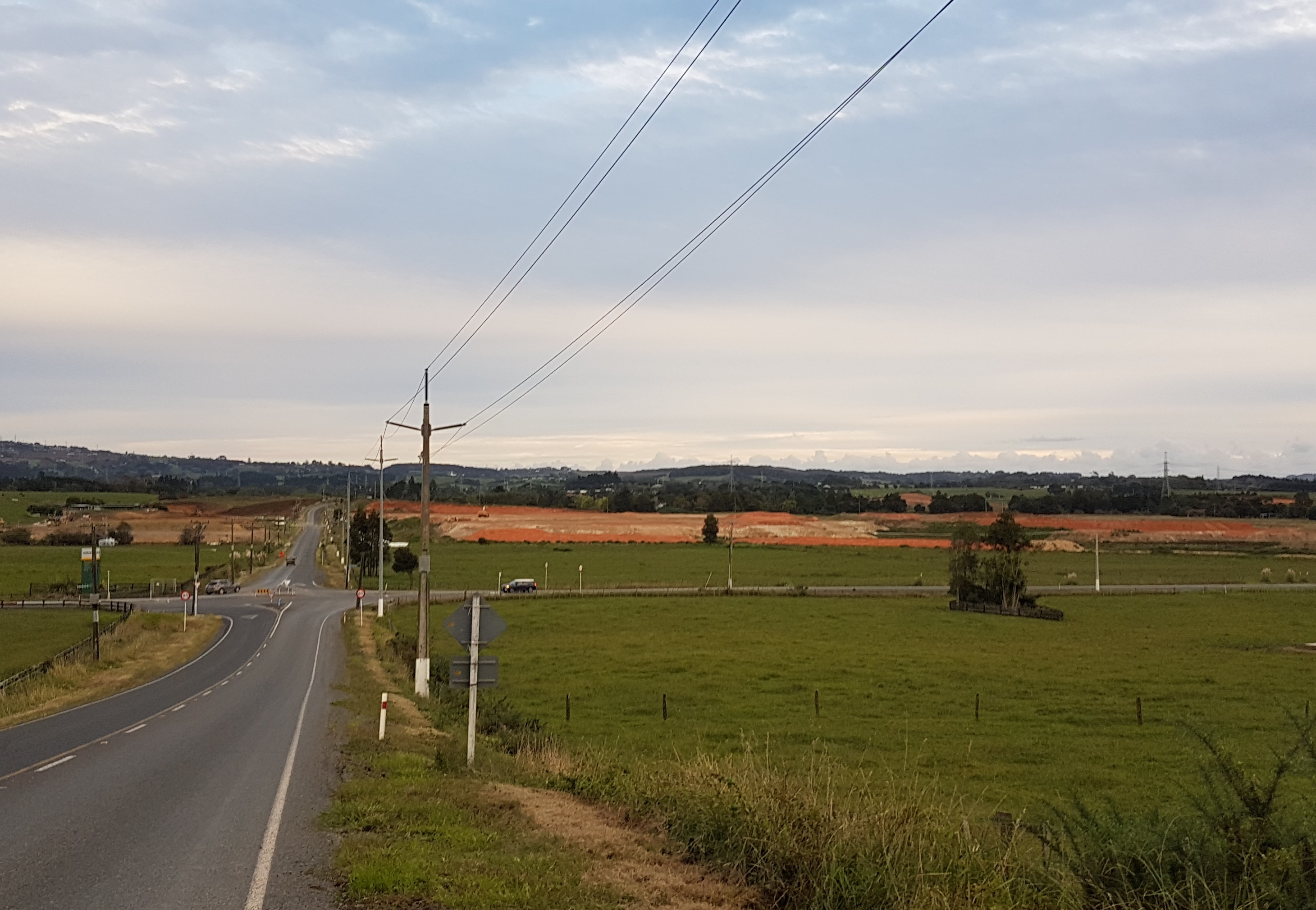
Excavation works at Drury South Crossing, March 2018

Auckland's largest business park, expected to employ 6900 people, is currently under development in the south of Drury. An estimated 2500 homes are also set to be built in the west of Drury, with development already well underway. Two train stations are set to open from 2026 onwards: Drury railway station and Ngākōroa railway station.

In 2020, the size of the developments and of the Auckland Council contribution was under consideration.

== Government ==
The Maketu Highway District was formed 26 September 1867, it was recorded in 1866 but not 1868 and likely became the Opaheke Highway District, which renamed to Drury in 1886. The Drury Road District Board amalgamated with Franklin County in 1915. Drury was one of eight ridings of Franklin County.

== Demographics ==
Drury covers 5.91 km^{2} (2.28 sq mi) and had an estimated population of 2,350 as of June 2025, with a population density of 398 people per km^{2}.

Historical population
Year	Pop.	±% p.a.
2006	1,248	—
2013	831	−5.64%
2018	915	+1.94%
2023	1,662	+12.68%
The 2006 population is for a significantly larger area of 10.39 km^{2}. Source:

Drury had a population of 1,662 in the 2023 New Zealand census, an increase of 747 people (81.6%) since the 2018 census, and an increase of 831 people (100.0%) since the 2013 census. There were 804 males, 852 females and 3 people of other genders in 591 dwellings. 2.7% of people identified as LGBTIQ+. The median age was 32.4 years (compared with 38.1 years nationally). There were 381 people (22.9%) aged under 15 years, 357 (21.5%) aged 15 to 29, 726 (43.7%) aged 30 to 64, and 201 (12.1%) aged 65 or older.

People could identify as more than one ethnicity. The results were 54.3% European (Pākehā); 24.7% Māori; 15.7% Pasifika; 25.5% Asian; 1.3% Middle Eastern, Latin American and African New Zealanders (MELAA); and 1.8% other, which includes people giving their ethnicity as "New Zealander". English was spoken by 93.0%, Māori language by 4.7%, Samoan by 3.2%, and other languages by 20.0%. No language could be spoken by 3.1% (e.g. too young to talk). New Zealand Sign Language was known by 0.9%. The percentage of people born overseas was 31.9, compared with 28.8% nationally.

Religious affiliations were 33.6% Christian, 5.6% Hindu, 1.6% Islam, 2.0% Māori religious beliefs, 1.1% Buddhist, 0.4% New Age, and 5.6% other religions. People who answered that they had no religion were 44.9%, and 5.2% of people did not answer the census question.

Of those at least 15 years old, 324 (25.3%) people had a bachelor's or higher degree, 612 (47.8%) had a post-high school certificate or diploma, and 345 (26.9%) people exclusively held high school qualifications. The median income was $47,000, compared with $41,500 nationally. 144 people (11.2%) earned over $100,000 compared to 12.1% nationally. The employment status of those at least 15 was that 723 (56.4%) people were employed full-time, 132 (10.3%) were part-time, and 48 (3.7%) were unemployed.

Individual statistical areas
Name	Area (km^{2})	Population	Density (per km^{2})	Dwellings	Median age	Median income
Drury West	2.85	891	313	324	31.6 years	$49,500
Drury East	3.06	768	251	267	34.4 years	$44,100
New Zealand					38.1 years	$41,500

=== Drury Rural ===
The area south and southeast of Drury, called Drury Rural by Statistics New Zealand prior to 2023, was enlarged and divided into three statistical areas. They cover 43.45 km^{2} (16.78 sq mi) and had an estimated population of 3,910 as of June 2025, with a population density of 90 people per km^{2}.

Historical population for Drury Rural
Year	Pop.	±% p.a.
2006	2,484	—
2013	3,102	+3.22%
2018	3,231	+0.82%
2023	3,513	+1.69%
The 2006 population is for a smaller area of 36.01 km^{2}. Source: source=

Drury Rural areas had a population of 3,513 in the 2023 New Zealand census, an increase of 282 people (8.7%) since the 2018 census, and an increase of 411 people (13.2%) since the 2013 census. There were 1,821 males, 1,680 females and 15 people of other genders in 1,137 dwellings. 2.7% of people identified as LGBTIQ+. There were 636 people (18.1%) aged under 15 years, 663 (18.9%) aged 15 to 29, 1,713 (48.8%) aged 30 to 64, and 501 (14.3%) aged 65 or older.

People could identify as more than one ethnicity. The results were 70.5% European (Pākehā); 18.8% Māori; 8.4% Pasifika; 19.1% Asian; 1.6% Middle Eastern, Latin American and African New Zealanders (MELAA); and 2.0% other, which includes people giving their ethnicity as "New Zealander". English was spoken by 94.8%, Māori language by 3.1%, Samoan by 0.9%, and other languages by 17.6%. No language could be spoken by 1.8% (e.g. too young to talk). New Zealand Sign Language was known by 0.3%. The percentage of people born overseas was 25.9, compared with 28.8% nationally.

Religious affiliations were 31.0% Christian, 1.4% Hindu, 2.9% Islam, 0.8% Māori religious beliefs, 1.3% Buddhist, 0.3% New Age, and 3.4% other religions. People who answered that they had no religion were 52.1%, and 7.1% of people did not answer the census question.

Of those at least 15 years old, 666 (23.1%) people had a bachelor's or higher degree, 1,539 (53.5%) had a post-high school certificate or diploma, and 672 (23.4%) people exclusively held high school qualifications. 516 people (17.9%) earned over $100,000 compared to 12.1% nationally. The employment status of those at least 15 was that 1,677 (58.3%) people were employed full-time, 363 (12.6%) were part-time, and 78 (2.7%) were unemployed.

Individual statistical areas
Name	Area (km^{2})	Population	Density (per km^{2})	Dwellings	Median age	Median income
Runciman	12.51	741	59	240	41.2 years	$49,100
Drury South Crossing	8.04	693	86	243	31.6 years	$60,700
Waihoehoe	22.90	2,079	91	654	43.2 years	$51,100
New Zealand					38.1 years	$41,500

== Education ==
Drury School is a full primary school (years 1–8) with a roll of 337. The school opened in 1857. Drury Christian School is a private composite school (years 1–13) with a roll of 33. Both these schools are coeducational. Rolls are as of July 2026.

St Ignatius of Loyola Catholic College is a state-integrated coeducational secondary school that opened in 2024 in Drury. It is the 15th Catholic College in Auckland. A significant housing development will also accompany the construction of the college.

== Notable buildings ==
- St Johns' Church (Anglican)

== See also ==
- Drury railway station
- Runciman railway station
