= Keri Hill =

- Suburb
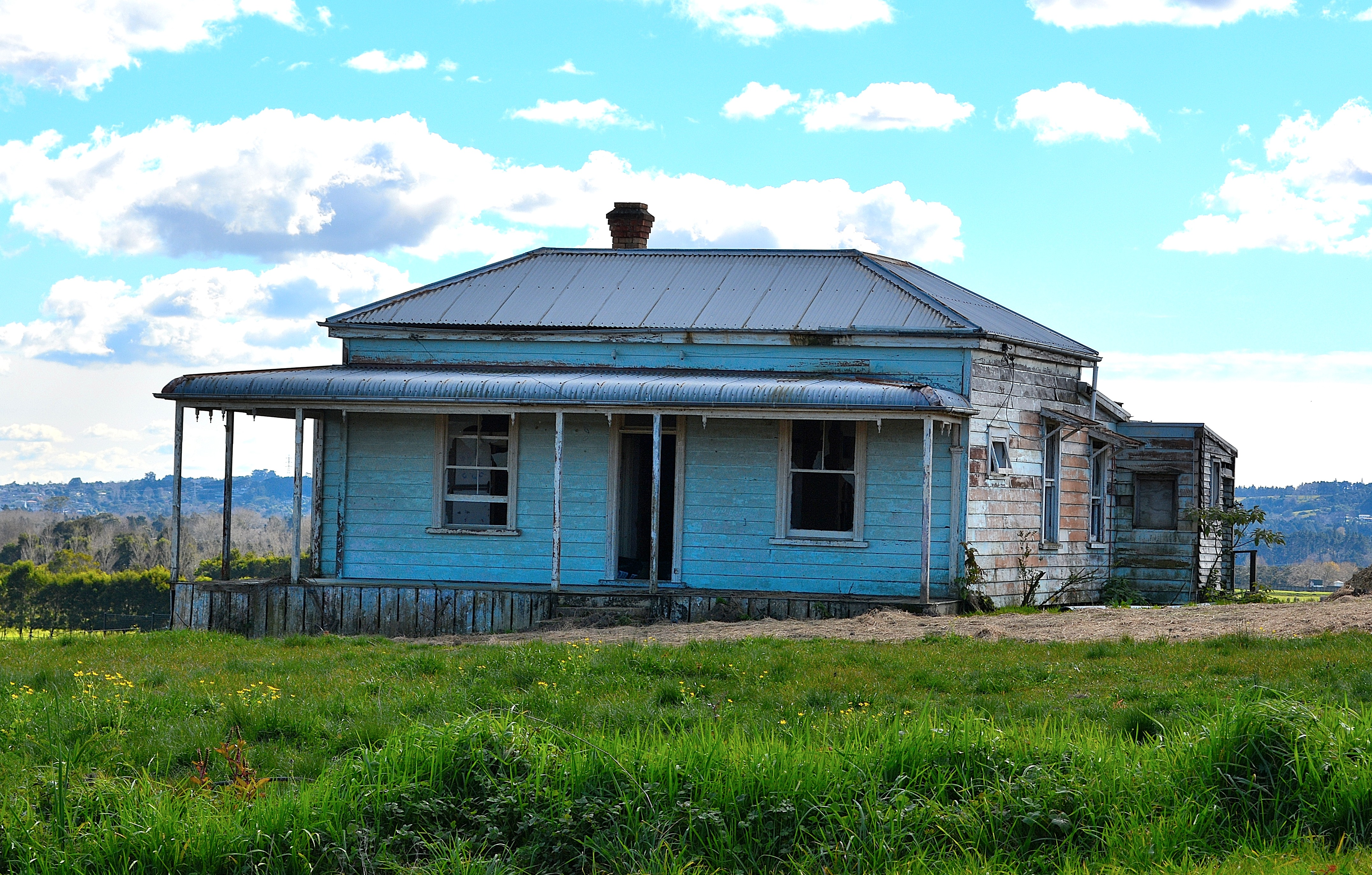
- An old farmhouse in Keri Hill
- Interactive map of Keri Hill
- Coordinates: 37°03′30″S 174°58′19″E
- Country: New Zealand
- City: Auckland Council
- Electoral ward: Manurewa-Papakura ward

Papakura North	Ardmore	to Clevedon
Papakura East	Keri Hill	Native Forest
Papakura	Red Hill	Red Hill

Keri Hill is a suburb of Auckland, in northern New Zealand. Located 32 kilometres to the southwest of Auckland CBD, under authority of the Auckland Council. The suburban area of Keri Hill pastoral lifestyle blocks overlooking Ardmore, Ardmore Airport, and Manukau Heights. The suburb is located between Red Hill and Ardmore incorporating a small residential and rural area.
