= Papakura Local Board =

Coordinates: 37.0608976°S 174.939831°E

Papakura Local Board Te Poari ā-Rohe o Papakura
- Local board of Papakura
- Country: New Zealand
- Region: Auckland
- Territorial authority: Auckland
- Ward: Manurewa-Papakura ward
- Legislated: 2010

Area
  - Land: 40.25 km^{2} (15.54 sq mi)

Population (June 2025)
  - Total: 84,200
  - Density: 2,090/km^{2} (5,420/sq mi)

Local Board Members

Leadership
- Chairperson: Kelvin Hieatt, Papakura Action Team
- Deputy chairperson: Brent Catchpole, Papakura Action Team

Structure
- Seats: 6
- Political groups: Papakura Action Team (6)
- Length of term: 3 years

Elections
- Last election: 2025
- Next election: 2028

Meeting place
- 35 Coles Crescent, Papakura

The Papakura Local Board is one of the 21 local boards of the Auckland Council. It is overseen by the Manurewa-Papakura ward councillor.

The local board area extends between Alfriston and Drury, and includes Takanini, Hingaia, Red Hill, Pahurehure and the Papakura town centre.

== Demographics ==
Papakura Local Board Area covers 40.25 km^{2} (15.54 sq mi) and had an estimated population of 84,200 as of June 2025, with a population density of 2,092 people per km^{2}.

Historical population
| Year | Pop. | ±% p.a. |
|---|---|---|
| 2006 | 41,559 | — |
| 2013 | 45,636 | +1.35% |
| 2018 | 57,636 | +4.78% |
| 2023 | 72,318 | +4.64% |

Papakura Local Board Area had a population of 72,318 in the 2023 New Zealand census, an increase of 14,682 people (25.5%) since the 2018 census, and an increase of 26,682 people (58.5%) since the 2013 census. There were 36,096 males, 36,057 females and 168 people of other genders in 21,669 dwellings. 2.4% of people identified as LGBTIQ+. The median age was 32.3 years (compared with 38.1 years nationally). There were 17,130 people (23.7%) aged under 15 years, 15,429 (21.3%) aged 15 to 29, 32,829 (45.4%) aged 30 to 64, and 6,933 (9.6%) aged 65 or older.

People could identify as more than one ethnicity. The results were 36.7% European (Pākehā); 24.6% Māori; 20.5% Pasifika; 34.2% Asian; 1.7% Middle Eastern, Latin American and African New Zealanders (MELAA); and 1.8% other, which includes people giving their ethnicity as "New Zealander". English was spoken by 90.8%, Māori language by 5.5%, Samoan by 5.3%, and other languages by 27.4%. No language could be spoken by 3.3% (e.g. too young to talk). New Zealand Sign Language was known by 0.5%. The percentage of people born overseas was 37.3, compared with 28.8% nationally.

Religious affiliations were 33.9% Christian, 8.4% Hindu, 2.5% Islam, 2.1% Māori religious beliefs, 1.4% Buddhist, 0.3% New Age, 0.1% Jewish, and 9.9% other religions. People who answered that they had no religion were 35.6%, and 6.1% of people did not answer the census question.

Of those at least 15 years old, 12,252 (22.2%) people had a bachelor's or higher degree, 25,218 (45.7%) had a post-high school certificate or diploma, and 17,721 (32.1%) people exclusively held high school qualifications. The median income was $44,000, compared with $41,500 nationally. 5,292 people (9.6%) earned over $100,000 compared to 12.1% nationally. The employment status of those at least 15 was that 30,144 (54.6%) people were employed full-time, 5,229 (9.5%) were part-time, and 2,544 (4.6%) were unemployed.

== 2025-2028 term ==
The current board members for the 2025-2028 term, elected at the 2025 local elections, are:

| Name | Affiliation | Position |
|---|---|---|
| Kelvin Hieatt | Papakura Action Team | Chairperson |
| Brent Catchpole | Papakura Action Team | Deputy Chairperson |
| Jan Robinson | Papakura Action Team | Board member |
| Felicity Auva'a | Papakura Action Team | Board member |
| George Hawkins | Papakura Action Team | Board member |
| Andrew Webster | Papakura Action Team | Board member |

== 2022-2025 term ==
The board members for the 2022-2025 term, elected at the 2022 local elections, were:

| Name | Ticket (if any) | Position |
|---|---|---|
| Brent Catchpole | Papakura Action Team | Chairperson |
| Jan Robinson JP | Papakura Action Team | Deputy Chairperson |
| Felicity Auva'a | Papakura Action Team | Board member |
| George Hawkins | Papakura Action Team | Board member |
| Andrew Webster | Papakura Action Team | Board member |
| Kelvin Hieatt | Papakura Action Team | Board member |

== 2019–2022 term ==
The members of the board, elected at the 2019 local body elections, were:

- Keven Mealamu, Papakura First – (6079 votes)
- Brent Catchpole, Papakura Action Team – (5247 votes)
- George Hawkins, Papakura Action Team – (4549 votes)
- Jan Robinson, Papakura Action Team – (4030 votes)
- Felicity Auva'a, Papakura First – (3699 votes)
- Sue Smurthwaite, Papakura Action Team – (3666 votes)

== 2016–2019 term ==
The board members who served from the 2016 local body elections to the 2019 elections were:

- Brent Catchpole (Chair)
- Felicity Auva'a (Deputy chair)
- George Hawkins
- Bill McEntee
- Michael Turner
- Katrina Winn
