= Ramarama, New Zealand =

Ramarama
- Interactive map of Ramarama
- Coordinates: 37.142°S 174.972°E
- Country: New Zealand
- Region: Auckland Region
- Ward: Franklin ward
- Board: Franklin Local Board
- Electorates: Papakura; Hauraki-Waikato (Māori)

Government
  - Territorial Authority: Auckland Council
  - Mayor of Auckland: Wayne Brown
  - Papakura MP: Vacant
  - Hauraki-Waikato MP: Hana-Rawhiti Maipi-Clarke

Area
  - Total: 39.69 km^{2} (15.32 sq mi)

Population (June 2025)
  - Total: 3,300
  - Density: 83/km^{2} (220/sq mi)

Ramarama, previously known as Sheppards Bush, is a small community at the far south of the Auckland Region in New Zealand's North Island, located just to the north of the Bombay Hills (a point commonly regarded as the most southern part of the Auckland region). Ramarama has an off-ramp at exit 466 on the motorway south of Auckland. The suburb is effectively sliced in two by the motorway, this section of which was constructed in 1978.

The main settlement of Ramarama contains a convenience store and several small businesses. Most of the land in the area is made up of market gardens, farms and lifestyle blocks as would be expected from the entirely rural region in which it is located. There are several floral/garden/nursery businesses with large glasshouses and a number of poultry/egg producing farms in the surrounding area.

Ramarama is named after ramarama, a small tree with leaves that can cure bruises if crushed.

== History ==
Ramarama was originally only bushland and also there was a pā site inhabited by the Ngāti Pou tribe of the Māori. It also hid pathways between Tamaki, Hauraki and the Waikato.

In the 1850s, the British built the Great South Road through the land. At the time of the Waikato War, the area was known as Sheppards Bush.

Reverend McDonald, a famed priest at the time, decided to build a church, where the Pratts Road Cemetery stands now. The church was called Saint Brigids and also functioned as a school. The church itself was moved to Selwyn Oaks, but the school was called Maketu School and henceforth Ramarama School.

The Te Maketu Waterfall is hidden behind the Pratts Road Cemetery. Reverend McDonald wrote a book on it called The Well Known Secret of the Waterfall.

- Country Women's Institute

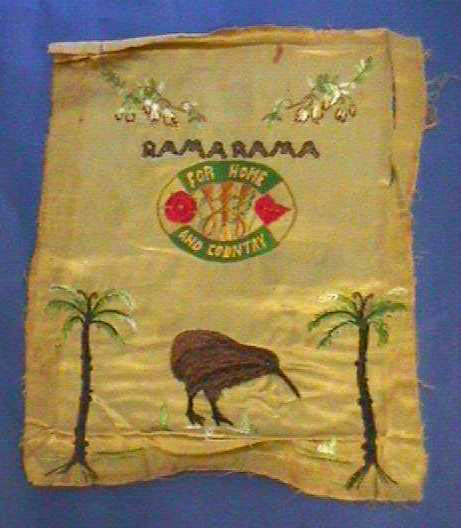
Country Women's Institute (CWI), Ramarama branch banner

The Ramarama branch of the Country Women's Institute, like many women's CWI groups across New Zealand supported the women and their families in the area. First formed in Ramarama on 10 May 1933, it took a very active part in raising money for the building of the Ramarama Hall. They held a Queen Carnival and took an active part in all other fund raising for the project.

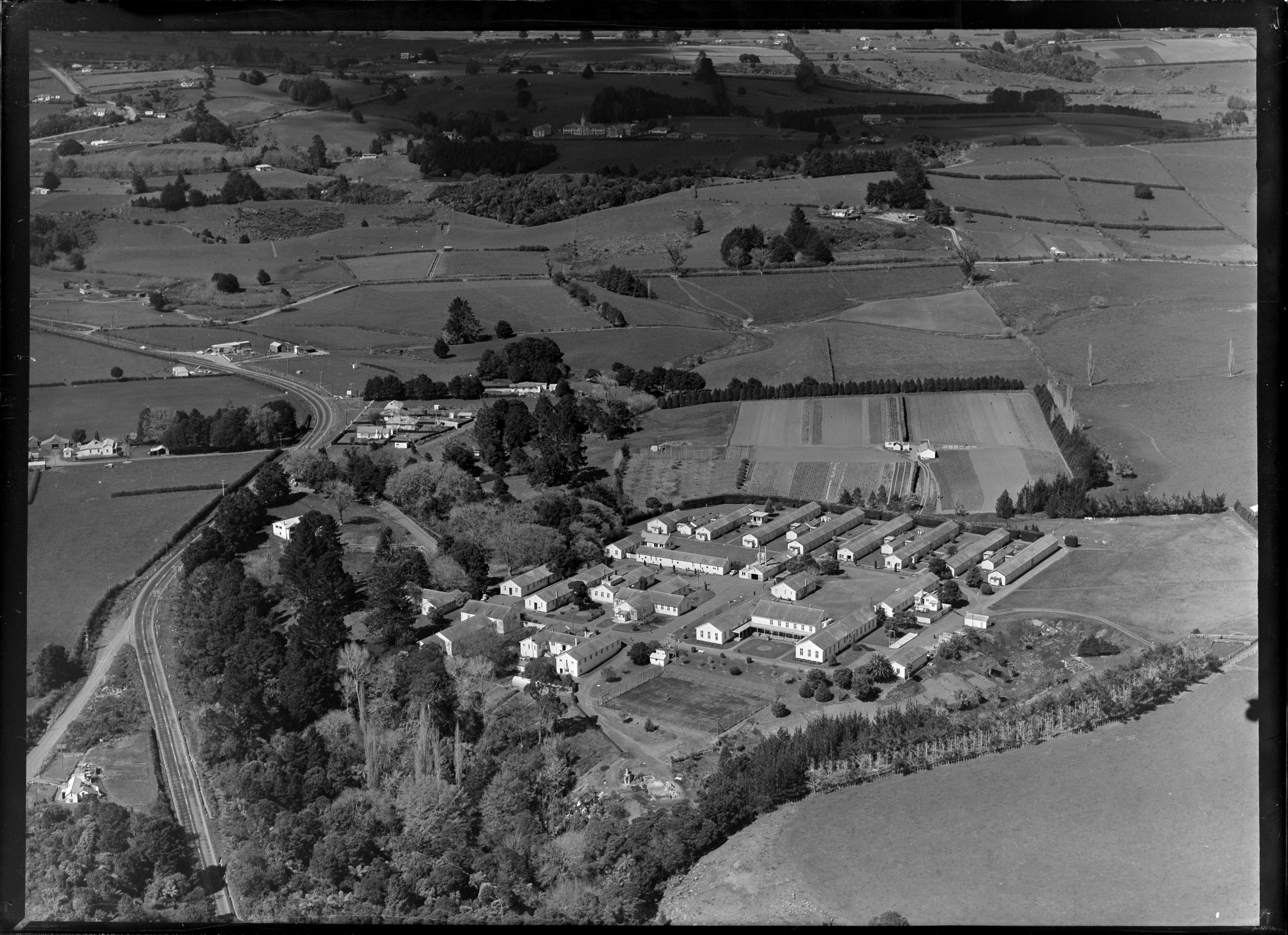
Raventhorpe hospital in 1962

The Northern Military District Convalescent Depot, opened in December 1942 as a place for troops to recover. It was between Ramarama and Bombay. In late 1945, ash from Ruapehu polluted the water supply of The Grand Chateau and patients who had been housed there were evacuated to what then became Raventhorpe psychiatric hospital. At the 1951 Census 278 people were living at the hospital. The hospital closed about 1991 and the land was sold, to become what is now Martyn Farm Estate.

== Demographics ==
Ramarama statistical area, which also includes Paerata, covers 39.69 km^{2} (15.32 sq mi) and had an estimated population of 3,300 as of June 2025, with a population density of 83 people per km^{2}.

Historical population
| Year | Pop. | ±% p.a. |
|---|---|---|
| 2006 | 1,917 | — |
| 2013 | 1,788 | −0.99% |
| 2018 | 1,812 | +0.27% |
| 2023 | 2,931 | +10.10% |
The 2006 population is for a larger area of 43.62 km^{2}. Source:

Ramarama had a population of 2,931 in the 2023 New Zealand census, an increase of 1,119 people (61.8%) since the 2018 census, and an increase of 1,143 people (63.9%) since the 2013 census. There were 1,509 males, 1,416 females and 9 people of other genders in 1,008 dwellings. 1.9% of people identified as LGBTIQ+. The median age was 39.0 years (compared with 38.1 years nationally). There were 558 people (19.0%) aged under 15 years, 510 (17.4%) aged 15 to 29, 1,428 (48.7%) aged 30 to 64, and 435 (14.8%) aged 65 or older.

People could identify as more than one ethnicity. The results were 75.8% European (Pākehā); 10.4% Māori; 8.4% Pasifika; 14.2% Asian; 1.3% Middle Eastern, Latin American and African New Zealanders (MELAA); and 2.3% other, which includes people giving their ethnicity as "New Zealander". English was spoken by 96.3%, Māori language by 1.7%, Samoan by 1.2%, and other languages by 16.7%. No language could be spoken by 2.0% (e.g. too young to talk). New Zealand Sign Language was known by 0.4%. The percentage of people born overseas was 27.6, compared with 28.8% nationally.

Religious affiliations were 34.8% Christian, 3.6% Hindu, 0.9% Islam, 0.4% Māori religious beliefs, 0.7% Buddhist, 0.2% New Age, 0.1% Jewish, and 2.3% other religions. People who answered that they had no religion were 51.7%, and 5.6% of people did not answer the census question.

Of those at least 15 years old, 693 (29.2%) people had a bachelor's or higher degree, 1,200 (50.6%) had a post-high school certificate or diploma, and 486 (20.5%) people exclusively held high school qualifications. The median income was $58,000, compared with $41,500 nationally. 537 people (22.6%) earned over $100,000 compared to 12.1% nationally. The employment status of those at least 15 was that 1,389 (58.5%) people were employed full-time, 321 (13.5%) were part-time, and 66 (2.8%) were unemployed.

== Education ==
Ramarama School is a coeducational full primary school (years 1–8) with a roll of 218 as of July 2026. The school was founded in 1867.

== Places of interest ==
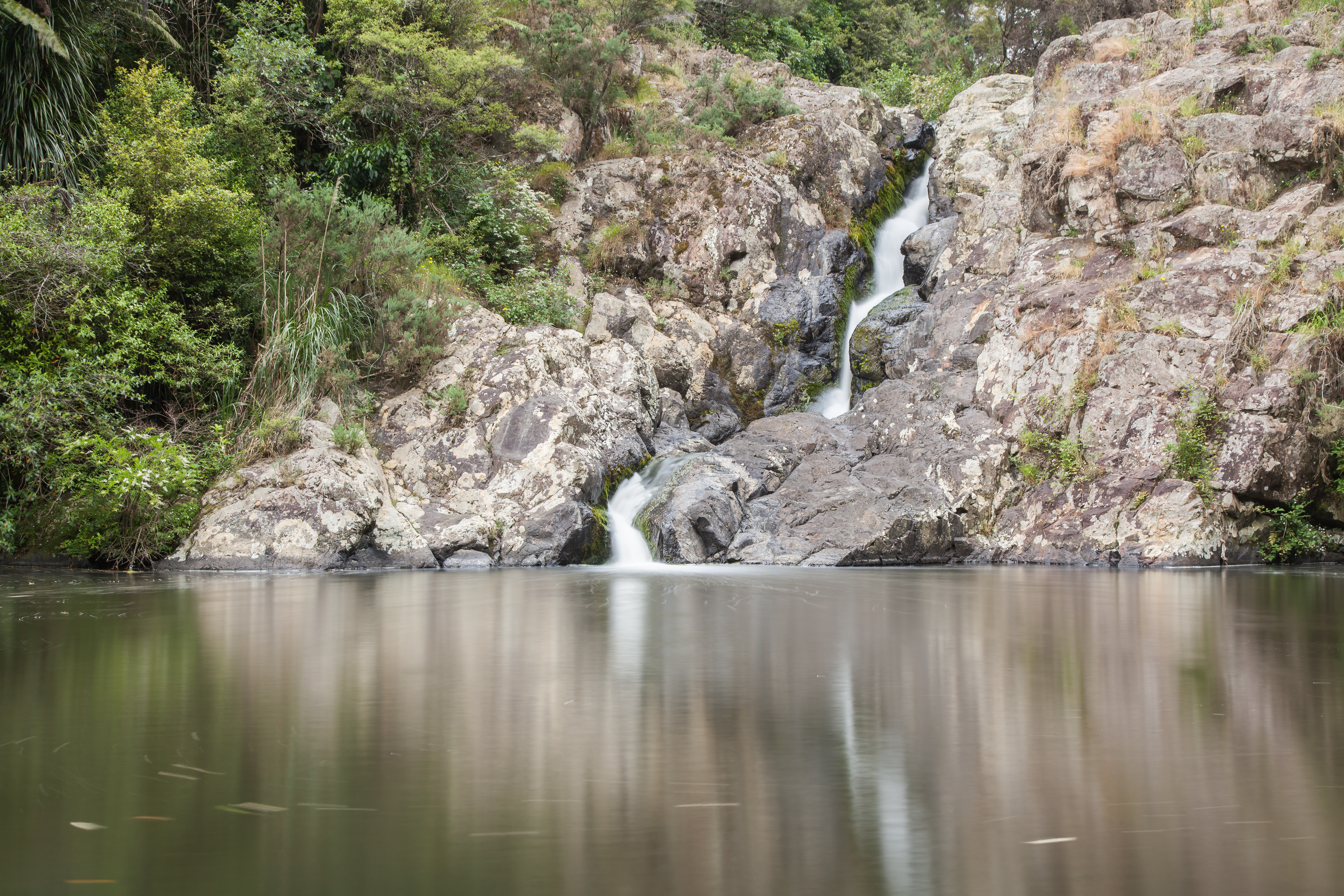
Maketu Stream

Te Maketu Falls – This is a waterfall about five minutes' walk from Pratts Rd Cemetery. With a large swimming hole at the base of the waterfall, it is a place to walk to, have a swim or photograph.

Pratts Road Cemetery – A place to remember the dead, especially soldiers who fought in the war

== Notable people ==
- Jane Mander, novelist, was born in Ramarama on 9 April 1877.
