= Karaka, New Zealand =

Karaka
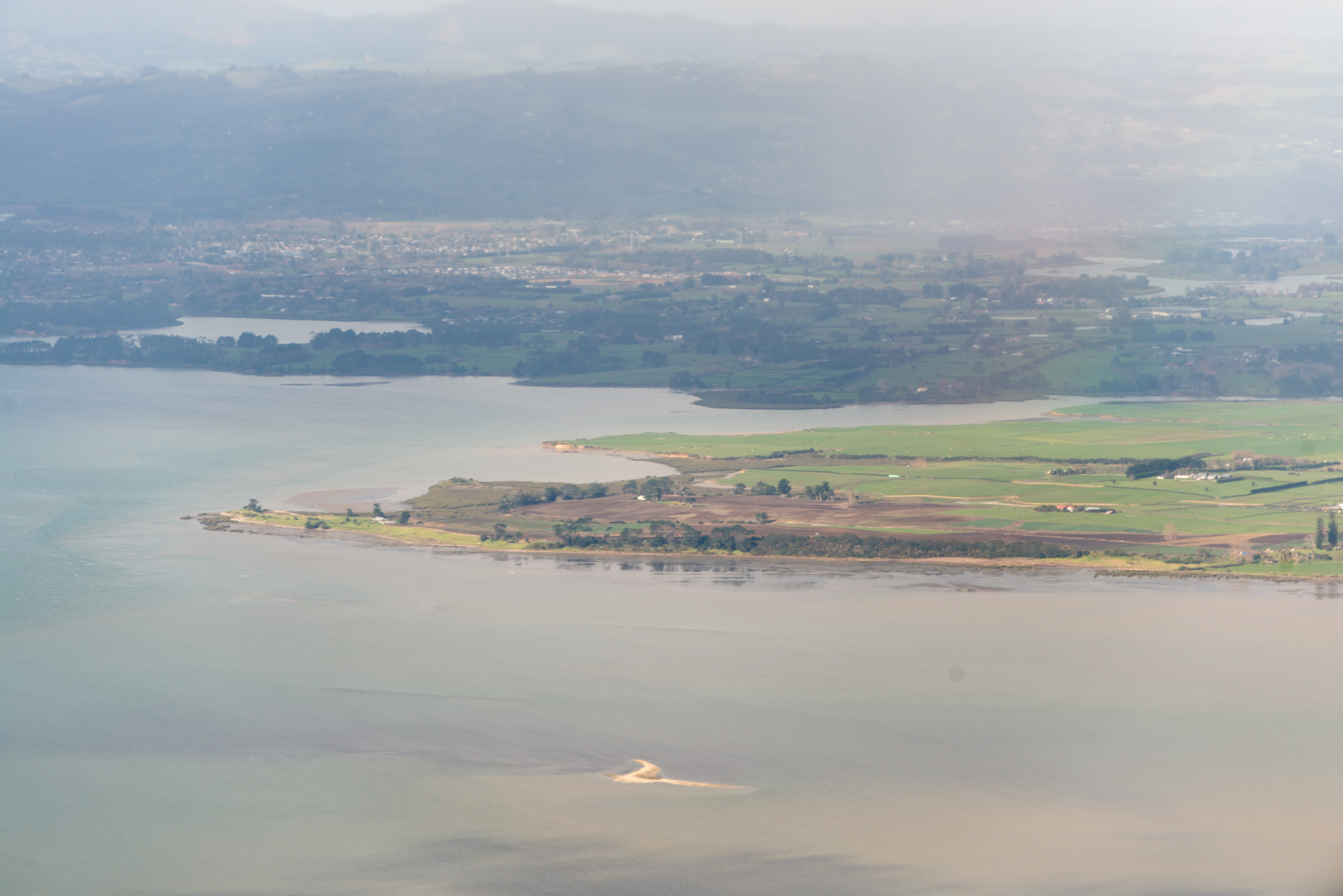
- Aerial view of northern Karaka, with Papakura and the Hunua Ranges in the background.
- Interactive map of Karaka
- Coordinates: 37°6′S 174°52′E
- Country: New Zealand
- Region: Auckland Region
- Territorial authority: Auckland Council
- Ward: Franklin ward
- Board: Franklin Local Board
- Electorates: Papakura; Hauraki-Waikato (Māori)

Government
  - Territorial Authority: Auckland Council
  - Mayor of Auckland: Wayne Brown
  - Papakura MP: Vacant
  - Hauraki-Waikato MP: Hana-Rawhiti Maipi-Clarke

Area
  - Total: 86.68 km^{2} (33.47 sq mi)

Population (June 2025)
  - Total: 3,150
  - Density: 36.3/km^{2} (94.1/sq mi)
- Postcode: 2120
- Area code: 09

Karaka is a small rural area in the south of Auckland, New Zealand. Formerly part of Franklin District and under the authority of the Franklin District Council, it is now part of Auckland Council (under the Franklin Local Board) following the amalgamation of the Auckland region's councils.

The area includes Karaka Lakes and Karaka Harbourside Estate.

== History ==
Between 1870 and 1900, Karaka, Waiuku and the Āwhitu Peninsula were major centres for the kauri gum industry.

== Government ==
Karaka was originally governed by the Karaka Road District Board, formed 26 September 1867, before amalgamating with Franklin County in 1918.

== Demographics ==
Kingseat-Karaka statistical area covers 86.68 km^{2} (33.47 sq mi) and had an estimated population of 3,150 as of June 2025, with a population density of 36 people per km^{2}.

Historical population
Year	Pop.	±% p.a.
2006	2,496	—
2013	2,550	+0.31%
2018	2,904	+2.63%
2023	2,994	+0.61%

Kingseat-Karaka had a population of 2,994 in the 2023 New Zealand census, an increase of 90 people (3.1%) since the 2018 census, and an increase of 444 people (17.4%) since the 2013 census. There were 1,509 males, 1,470 females and 15 people of other genders in 1,017 dwellings. 2.7% of people identified as LGBTIQ+. The median age was 43.2 years (compared with 38.1 years nationally). There were 588 people (19.6%) aged under 15 years, 465 (15.5%) aged 15 to 29, 1,440 (48.1%) aged 30 to 64, and 498 (16.6%) aged 65 or older.

People could identify as more than one ethnicity. The results were 80.3% European (Pākehā); 16.5% Māori; 4.0% Pasifika; 12.2% Asian; 1.1% Middle Eastern, Latin American and African New Zealanders (MELAA); and 2.1% other, which includes people giving their ethnicity as "New Zealander". English was spoken by 96.0%, Māori language by 2.4%, Samoan by 0.6%, and other languages by 12.4%. No language could be spoken by 1.8% (e.g. too young to talk). New Zealand Sign Language was known by 0.3%. The percentage of people born overseas was 20.1, compared with 28.8% nationally.

Religious affiliations were 30.5% Christian, 0.9% Hindu, 0.6% Islam, 1.3% Māori religious beliefs, 0.5% Buddhist, 0.3% New Age, and 2.8% other religions. People who answered that they had no religion were 54.8%, and 8.6% of people did not answer the census question.

Of those at least 15 years old, 591 (24.6%) people had a bachelor's or higher degree, 1,275 (53.0%) had a post-high school certificate or diploma, and 546 (22.7%) people exclusively held high school qualifications. The median income was $49,600, compared with $41,500 nationally. 504 people (20.9%) earned over $100,000 compared to 12.1% nationally. The employment status of those at least 15 was that 1,287 (53.5%) people were employed full-time, 378 (15.7%) were part-time, and 60 (2.5%) were unemployed.

== Economy ==
Karaka is now primarily a rural town associated with thoroughbred horse studs, dairy farming and sheep farming. Karaka is the location of the thoroughbred yearling sales at New Zealand Bloodstock Karaka Sales Complex which is associated with the Karaka Million race meeting at Ellerslie Racecourse. Westbury Stud and Haunui Farm are both located in Karaka.

== Education ==
Karaka School and Te Hihi School are coeducational full primary schools (years 1–8) with rolls of 242 and 139 students, respectively. Karaka School celebrated its 75th jubilee in 1978. Te Hihi School opened in 1914.

Rolls are as of July 2026.

Public secondary education is provided in the nearby towns of Papakura and Pukekohe.
