= Manurewa-Papakura ward =

- Ward of Auckland
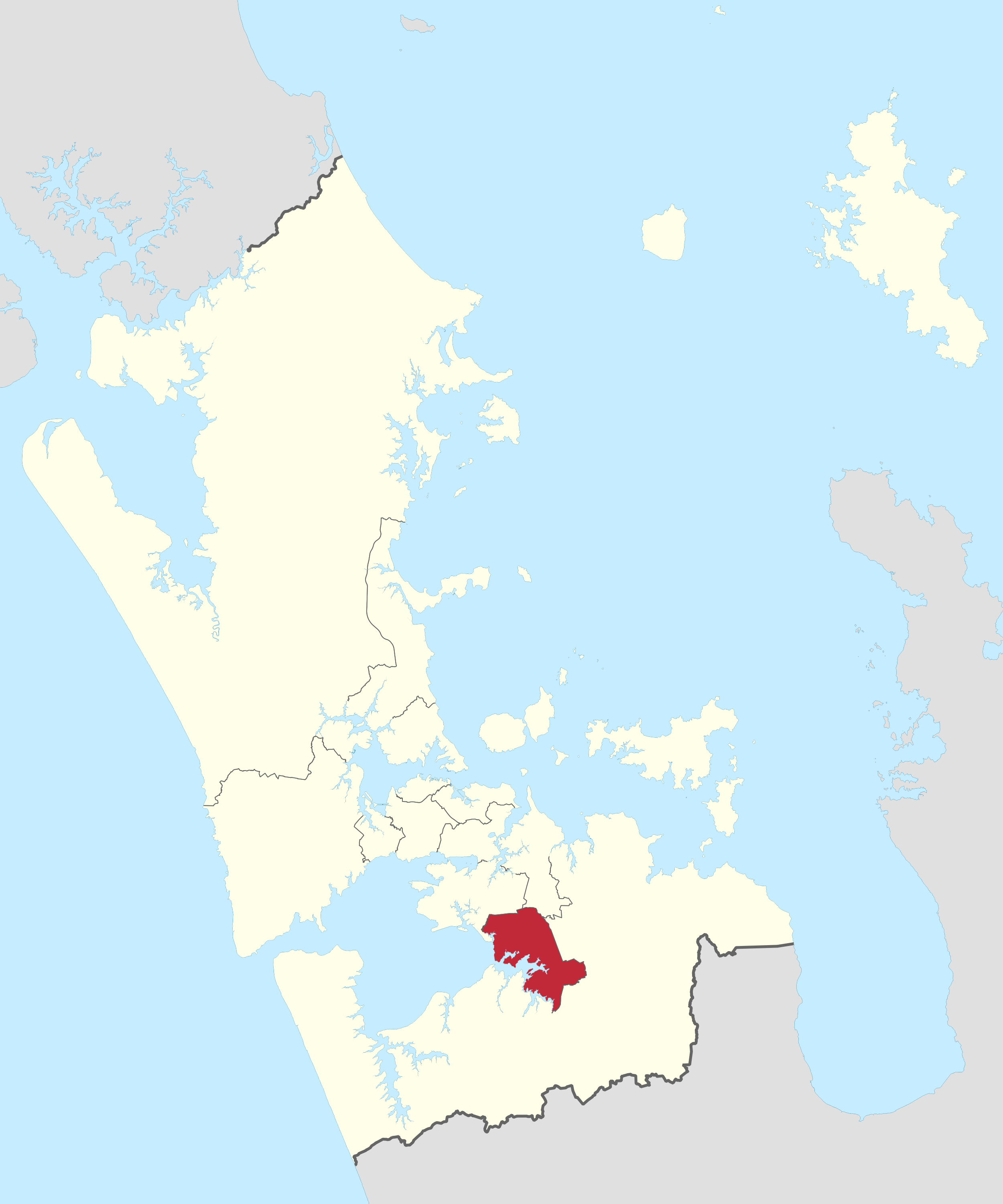
- Country: New Zealand
- Island: North Island
- Region: Auckland Region

Area
  - Land: 77.35 km^{2} (29.87 sq mi)

Population (June 2025)
  - Total: 194,600
  - Density: 2,516/km^{2} (6,516/sq mi)

The Manurewa-Papakura ward is an Auckland Council ward which elects two councillors and covers the Manurewa and Papakura Local Boards. The two councillors are currently Daniel Newman and Matt Winiata.

== Demographics ==
Manurewa-Papakura ward covers 77.35 km^{2} (29.87 sq mi) and had an estimated population of 194,600 as of June 2025, with a population density of 2,516 people per km^{2}.

Historical population
Year	Pop.	±% p.a.
2006	118,752	—
2013	127,875	+1.06%
2018	153,303	+3.69%
2023	171,105	+2.22%

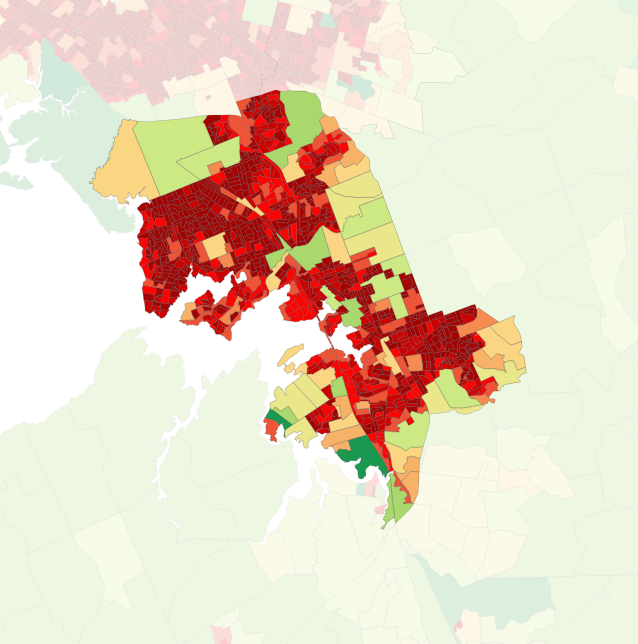
Population density in the 2023 census

Manurewa-Papakura ward had a population of 171,105 in the 2023 New Zealand census, an increase of 17,802 people (11.6%) since the 2018 census, and an increase of 43,230 people (33.8%) since the 2013 census. There were 85,398 males, 85,290 females and 417 people of other genders in 47,604 dwellings. 2.3% of people identified as LGBTIQ+. The median age was 31.6 years (compared with 38.1 years nationally). There were 41,130 people (24.0%) aged under 15 years, 39,114 (22.9%) aged 15 to 29, 74,820 (43.7%) aged 30 to 64, and 16,035 (9.4%) aged 65 or older.

People could identify as more than one ethnicity. The results were 29.7% European (Pākehā); 24.9% Māori; 31.7% Pasifika; 30.4% Asian; 2.0% Middle Eastern, Latin American and African New Zealanders (MELAA); and 1.4% other, which includes people giving their ethnicity as "New Zealander". English was spoken by 90.7%, Māori language by 6.0%, Samoan by 9.9%, and other languages by 25.9%. No language could be spoken by 3.1% (e.g. too young to talk). New Zealand Sign Language was known by 0.5%. The percentage of people born overseas was 38.0, compared with 28.8% nationally.

Religious affiliations were 39.7% Christian, 8.2% Hindu, 2.9% Islam, 2.4% Māori religious beliefs, 1.5% Buddhist, 0.2% New Age, 0.1% Jewish, and 7.1% other religions. People who answered that they had no religion were 31.9%, and 6.4% of people did not answer the census question.

Of those at least 15 years old, 23,970 (18.4%) people had a bachelor's or higher degree, 60,903 (46.9%) had a post-high school certificate or diploma, and 45,099 (34.7%) people exclusively held high school qualifications. The median income was $39,900, compared with $41,500 nationally. 9,921 people (7.6%) earned over $100,000 compared to 12.1% nationally. The employment status of those at least 15 was that 67,923 (52.3%) people were employed full-time, 12,015 (9.2%) were part-time, and 6,411 (4.9%) were unemployed.

== Councillors ==
Manurewa-Papakura Ward councillors of Auckland
- Incumbent; Daniel Newman; Matt Winiata
- Term length: Three years
- Inaugural holder: John Walker; Calum Penrose
- Formation: 1 November 2010
- Website: www.aucklandcouncil.govt.nz

Election		Councillors elected	Affiliation	Votes	Notes
2010	1	John Walker	Independent	20996	
2010	2	Calum Penrose	Manurewa-Papakura First Action	17266	
2013	1	John Walker	Independent for Manurewa-Papakura	15577	
2013	2	Calum Penrose	Independent for Manurewa-Papakura	13696	
2016	1	Daniel Newman	Manurewa-Papakura Action Team	15423	
2016	2	John Walker	Independent	14794	Retired at the 2019 elections.
2019	1	Angela Dalton	Manurewa-Papakura Action Team	17362	
2019	2	Daniel Newman	Manurewa-Papakura Action Team	15904	
2022	1	Daniel Newman	Manurewa-Papakura Action Team	15,214	
2022	2	Angela Dalton		12,055	
2025	1	Daniel Newman	Manurewa-Papakura Action Team		
2025	2	Matt Winiata	Manurewa-Papakura Action Team		

== Election results ==
Election results for the Manurewa-Papakura ward:

=== 2025 election results ===
Manurewa-Papakura ward
Affiliation	Candidate	Votes	%
Manurewa-Papakura Action Team	Daniel Newman^{†}	15,661	
Manurewa-Papakura Action Team	Matt Winiata	13,270	
#LoveManurewaPapakura	Joseph Allan	7,605	
#LoveManurewaPapakura	Angela Cunningham-Marino	7,388	
Independent	Karin Kerr	2,754	
Independent	Glenn Archibald	1,982	
Independent	Tofa Winterstein	1,741	
Informal		45	
Blank		596	
Turnout			
Registered		112,853	
Manurewa-Papakura Action Team hold			
Manurewa-Papakura Action Team gain from Independent			
^{†} incumbent

=== 2022 election results ===
	Name	Affiliation	Votes
1	Daniel Newman	Manurewa-Papakura Action Team	15214
2	Angela Dalton		12055
	Rangi McLean	Manurewa-Papakura Action Team	7948
	Sago Feagaiga	Labour	6315
	Ilango Krishnamoorthy	Labour	4049
	Karin Kerr		3046
Blank			924
Informal			42

=== 2016 election results ===
	Name	Affiliation	Votes	%
1	Daniel Newman	Manurewa-Papakura Action Team	15,423	33.9%
2	John Walker		14,794	32.6%
	Calum Penrose		13,790	30.3%
Blank			1,414	3.1%
Informal			17	0.0%
Turnout			45,438	
