= Homai School =

School in Manurewa, New Zealand

Location
- 89 Browns Road, Manurewa, Auckland 2102; 37.01243°S 174.880252°E

Information
- Type: State Co-Ed Contributing (Year 1-6)
- Ministry of Education Institution no.: 1317
- Principal: Christina Patea
- Enrolment: 396 (July 2026)
- Website: www.homai.school.nz

Homai School is a Primary School (years 1–6) in Homai, a suburb of the Manurewa area in South Auckland, New Zealand.

== History ==
During the large population growth in Manurewa in the 1950s, Manurewa Central School struggled to provide places for all of the students who needed places. Because of this, a number of new schools were established in the area. Homai School was the third, after St Anne's Catholic School.

Plans for the development of the school began in 1951. The Education Board chose a site on Browns Road, formerly the farm of H. T. and J. J. Smyth was chosen as a suitable place for a primary school. The school opened with six classrooms in April 1955, originally with the name Manurewa North School.

In 1960, Manurewa High School was built on land adjacent to Homai School. A row of trees was planted between the sites, to create a defined boundary between the two.

The school changed its name to Browns Road School, and later chose the name Homai School.
