= Southmall Manurewa =

Shopping centre in Auckland, New Zealand

- Location: Manurewa, Auckland, New Zealand
- Coordinates: 37°01′21″S 174°53′49″E
- Opened: 22 November 1967; 58 years ago
- Developer: Hammerson Property & Investment Trust
- Manager: Livingstones Ltd
- Owner: Livingstones Ltd
- Num. of stores: 49
- Num. of anchor tenants: 3
- Floor area: 36,323 m^{2} (390,978 sq ft)
- Floors: 1
- Website: www.southmall.co.nz

Southmall Manurewa is a shopping centre located in Manurewa, a suburb of Auckland, New Zealand, located 24.7 kilometres (15.3 mi) south of the Auckland CBD.

== History ==
The large Norfolk Pine tree which still stands outside the main entrance of the mall was planted circa 1911 (115 years ago). Its removal was proposed during the development of the mall. Manurewa Borough Council first illuminated the tree as a Christmas attraction in 1950; a responsibility later taken over by the local business association. A cross was first placed at the top of the tree in 1953, during the first visit to New Zealand of Queen Elizabeth II.

Plans for an American-style shopping centre in Manurewa began in the early 1960s. Manurewa was chosen due to its increasing population, and its proximity to the industrial areas in Wiri. The centre was developed by London based Hammerson Property & Investment Trust, who had developed the first mall in Auckland, LynnMall. It was Auckland's third major mall after LynnMall and the Pakuranga Town Centre.

The project was confirmed in May 1964 and the foundation stone was laid on 18 March 1965. When it was opened on 22 February 1967, the complex included over 100,000 square feet of retail space, with Farmers taking up a fifth of the retail space, along with Woolworths, New World, Bond & Bond, and several other major retail chains represented, as well as a variety of speciality shops. The Maple Home Furnishing Centre was developed in 1970 at Southmall’s southern end.

Southmall faced stiff competition after the larger and more glamorous Manukau City Centre mall opened less than five kilometres away in October 1976. The Southmall creche was closed down in 1985 because of lack of support from the retailers. In 1987 the centre was extensively remodeled and extended, becoming an enclosed mall. Southmall began Sunday trading on 7 July 1991.

In 1992 the mall was put on the market, boasting four major retailers, 38 speciality shops and a 99% occupancy rate. In 1994 the then owners, Ladstone Properties, divided the mall into twenty strata-title properties which were auctioned individually.

On 20 July 2006 the Manurewa railway station moved to a site behind the mall. The Manurewa interchange opened on the same day next to the station, providing interconnection with Auckland's bus network.

By the early 1990s chain stores had begun to leave. In 2008 a bar in the mall introduced topless waitresses. In 2016, Southmall Manurewa was nominated as one of the 'saddest' malls in New Zealand, citing a lack of development, an "uninviting and dangerous" vibe and Westfield Manukau in the nearby vicinity attracting more appeal from shoppers.

== See also ==
- List of shopping centres in New Zealand
