= Nathan Homestead =

Historic house in Auckland, New Zealand

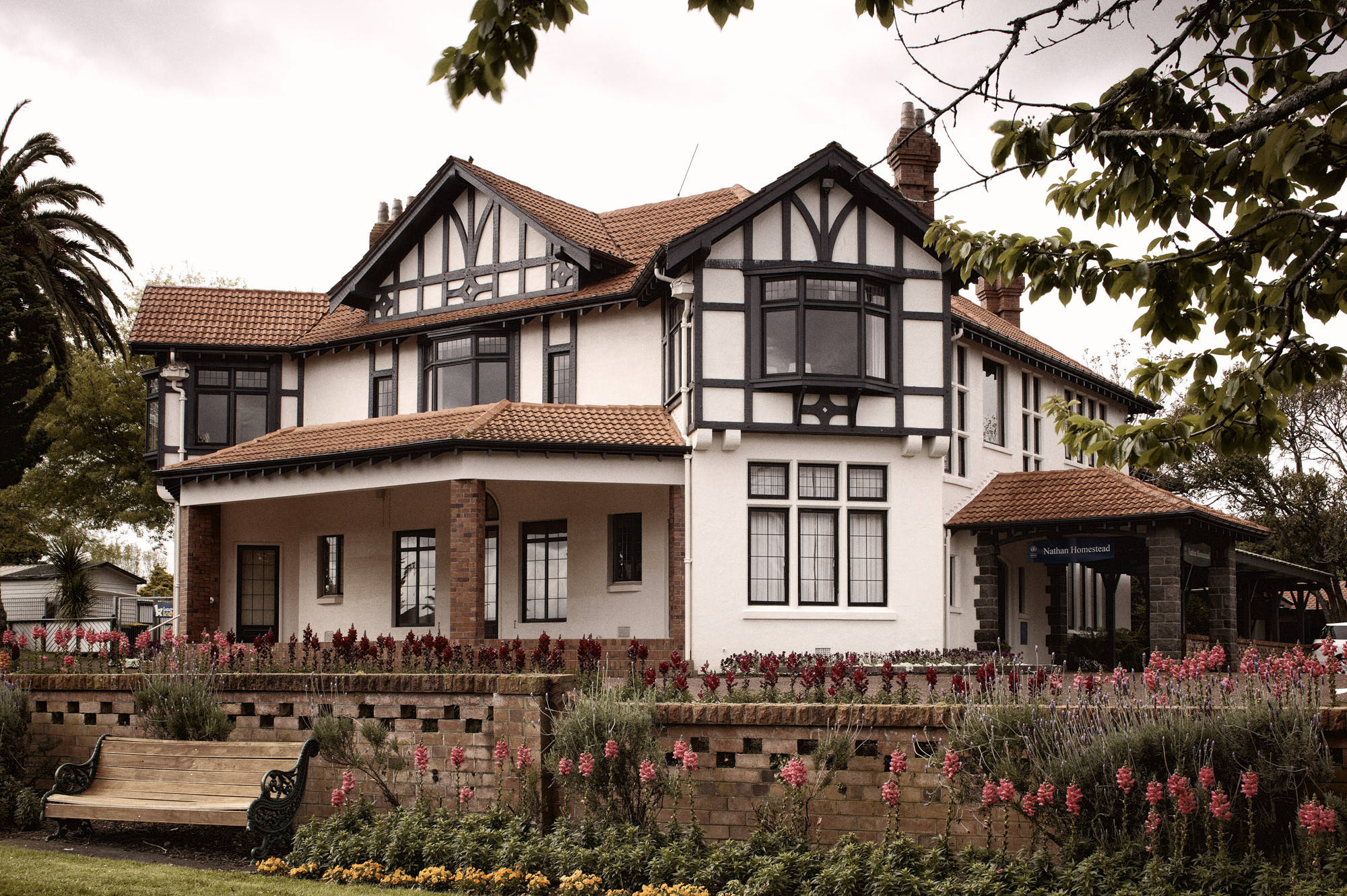
- Exterior view of Nathan Homestead, November 2013. In the foreground flowers adorn the brick wall that lines the driveway
- Interactive map of the Nathan Homestead area

General information
- Architectural style: Tudor Revival
- Location: 68R Hill Road, Manurewa,, Auckland, New Zealand
- Coordinates: 37°00′55″S 174°54′09″E
- Year built: 1923-1925
- Opened: 14 October 1978
- Owner: Auckland Council

Design and construction
- Architect: Daniel B Patterson

Website
- Auckland Council - Park Details

Nathan Homestead (Māori: Pukepuke) is a historic site located in Manurewa, Auckland, New Zealand. Developed from the remnants of the Nathan family farm, the Homestead and its surrounding park spans 3.7 hectares and features community buildings, playgrounds, landscaped gardens, a totara-kahikatea forest, and the aforementioned Nathan Homestead, a brick mansion built in 1925 for the Nathan Family.

Owned by the Nathan family since 1910, the site was transferred to the Manurewa Borough Council in 1961 as part of the development of the Hillpark subdivision.

The homestead served as council offices until 1976, after which it was repurposed as a community arts and cultural center. Owned and operated by Auckland Council, it continues to function as a venue for arts activities, exhibitions, childcare, and events. The property is recognized as a Category A Historic Heritage Place in the Auckland Unitary Plan for its historical, architectural, and ecological significance.

== History ==
=== Early Ownership and Land Acquisition (1842-1910) ===
The land on which David Nathan Park and Homestead are situated holds significant cultural and historical importance to Te Ākitai Waiohua, the iwi whose ancestral lands include the Manurewa and Manukau regions. The park lies at the outer boundary of the Papakura Block, the site of the first land transaction between Te Ākitai Waiohua and the Crown in 1842.

Manurewa itself was part of a vast land purchase by William Thomas Fairburn of the Church Missionary Society made prior to 1840. Fairburn's purchase spanned nearly all the land from Otahuhu to Papakura. While Fairburn initially estimated his holdings at 40,000 acres (162 km^{2}), later surveys revealed they exceeded 82,000 acres (332 km^{2}). Amid criticism over the size of his land holdings, Fairburn resigned from the Church Missionary Society in November 1841, after which the Crown acquired all surplus land to be allocated for use by other European settlers, leaving Fairburn with 5,494 acres.

10,000 acres of Fairburn's purchase was gifted to James Reddy Clendon in compensation for land taken in Russell for use by the Crown as the new capital of New Zealand. Clendon sold portions of this land to settlers, and over several decades, ownership changed hands multiple times. By 1910, farmer Godwyn Dalrymple Smith sold 100 acres of the land to David Laurence Nathan for £3000.

=== The Nathan Family Home at The Hill (1910-1923) ===
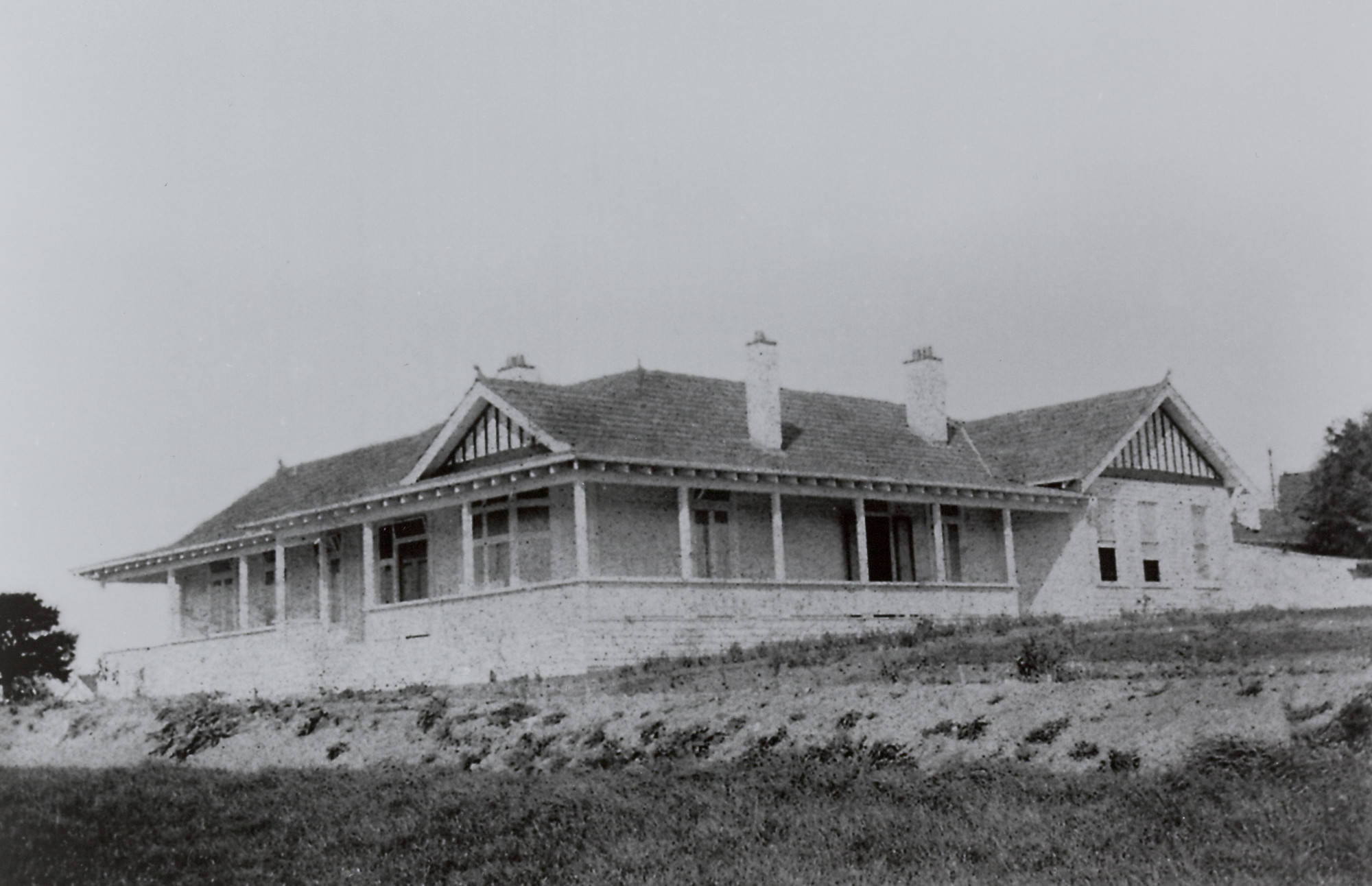
The Hill, the large villa in Hill Road, Manurewa, which served as the Nathan family's summer residence, circa 1912.

David Laurence Nathan (1882–1944) initially purchased the Manurewa property as a summer retreat for his family, spending winters at their primary residence, St Kevens, on Karangahape Road. Nathan, being an alumnus of Harrow School, named the summer home The Hill, as a reminder of his years spent at the boarding school.

By 1919, the Nathan household had expanded significantly with the births of four children: Lawrence David Jose (1910), Jacqueline (1911), Dennis Raoul Hillel (1912), and Frank (1918). That year, Nathan also acquired an additional 120 acres adjoining the northern boundary, enlarging the farm to stretch from Hill Road to Orams Road.

The growing family's needs, coupled with rising maintenance costs and increasing commercial encroachment around St Kevens, led to the decision to make their Manurewa property, known as The Hill, their permanent home in 1920. To accommodate the family, they expanded the house, adding a second floor and enlarging the ground floor.

On 22 December 1923, a fire broke out at 5 a.m. and quickly consumed the house. Without a local fire brigade, the timber structure was destroyed in 30 minutes. Although some belongings were salvaged, the fire resulted in the loss of priceless heirlooms passed down from Nathan's grandfather David Nathan, as well as works of art and antiques collected by the Nathans over the years

=== Creation of the Nathan Homestead (1924-1961) ===
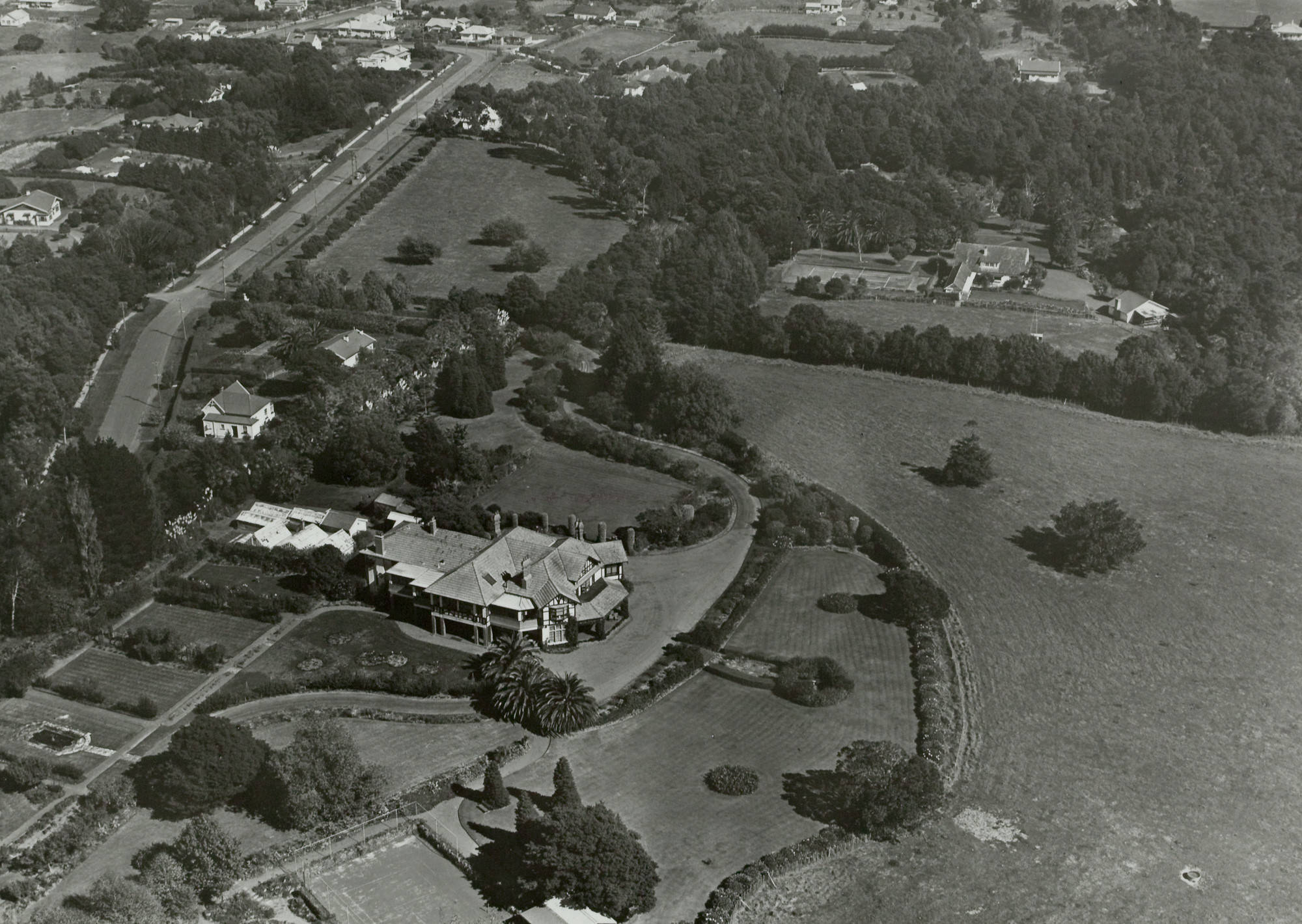
Aerial view of The Hill, the Nathan family's residence in Hill Road, Manurewa, April, 1949.

Following the loss of their home in 1923, the Nathan family temporarily moved to Longford, the home of Mrs. Alfred Nathan in Kohimarama. However, David Laurence Nathan's attachment to his garden and his children's preference to stay at The Hill prompted the decision to rebuild on the original site. Architect Daniel Boys Patterson designed the new house and water tower, and Thomas Clements of Otahuhu was contracted for construction.

Construction was completed in 1925, and in 1932, Nathan expanded the property further by purchasing an additional 100 acres from the Auckland Hospital Board, bringing the estate to 300 acres.

During the Second World War, the Manurewa area, including parts of the Nathan estate, became a base for United States military personnel. Camps were established in several locations, including near The Hill. These camps supported Pacific Theatre operations and strengthened New Zealand's defences.

From 1942, Manurewa hosted several camps for United States military personnel. These included five camps in the area: one on Grande Vue Road, two near Manurewa House (now Orford Lodge), and two off Hill Road. The latter were known as Manurewa No. 1, situated near the current site of the Botanic Gardens carpark, and Manurewa No. 2, which spanned several ridges in the fields between Hill Road and the Puhinui Stream.

On July 7, 1944, David Laurence Nathan suffered a cerebral haemorrhage at the Hamilton Hotel and died in Waikato Hospital. Nathan left the family property, The Hill, to his wife, Simone, and the remainder of his estate to his four sons. Wartime challenges and labour shortages made maintaining the estate difficult. After the war, Frank Nathan took over farm management.

Over time, the Nathan family dispersed, and Simone, who had been interested in the Zionist cause for years, decided to immigrate to Israel to live with her son John in 1959, where she died in Jerusalem in 1974.

=== Subdivision and Use by Council (1961 - 1978) ===
The construction of the Southern Motorway in the 1960s split the Nathan farm along the boundary between Manurewa Borough and Manukau County. Rising rates on the Manurewa side made farming increasingly unviable, leading the Nathan brothers to subdivide that portion of the land, which was developed into the suburb of Hillpark.

Although none of the Nathan brothers residing in Auckland wished to live at The Hill, they were determined to preserve their father's cherished garden and native bush. To this end, they granted the homestead and surrounding land to the Manurewa Borough Council in lieu of a reserve contribution. The Council named the area David Nathan Park and formally assumed responsibility for the homestead on 14 March 1962.

In 1964, the Borough Council leased the homestead, now known as Nathan Homestead, to the Manukau County Council for use as administrative offices. The building's larger rooms were partitioned to create office spaces, with the drawing room serving as the Mayor's office and other spaces accommodating city officials and staff.

In May 1967, Manukau City Council joined with the Auckland Regional Authority to purchase the remaining 209-acres (84.6 ha) of the Nathan farm, with transfers made early in 1968. Frank Nathan, who had farmed the land since 1945, decided to retire, prompting the family to sell part of the farm to the Auckland Regional Authority for the creation of the Auckland Botanic Gardens, while the remainder was given to the Manukau City Council for recreational use.

=== Transition to Cultural Arts Centre (1977 - present) ===
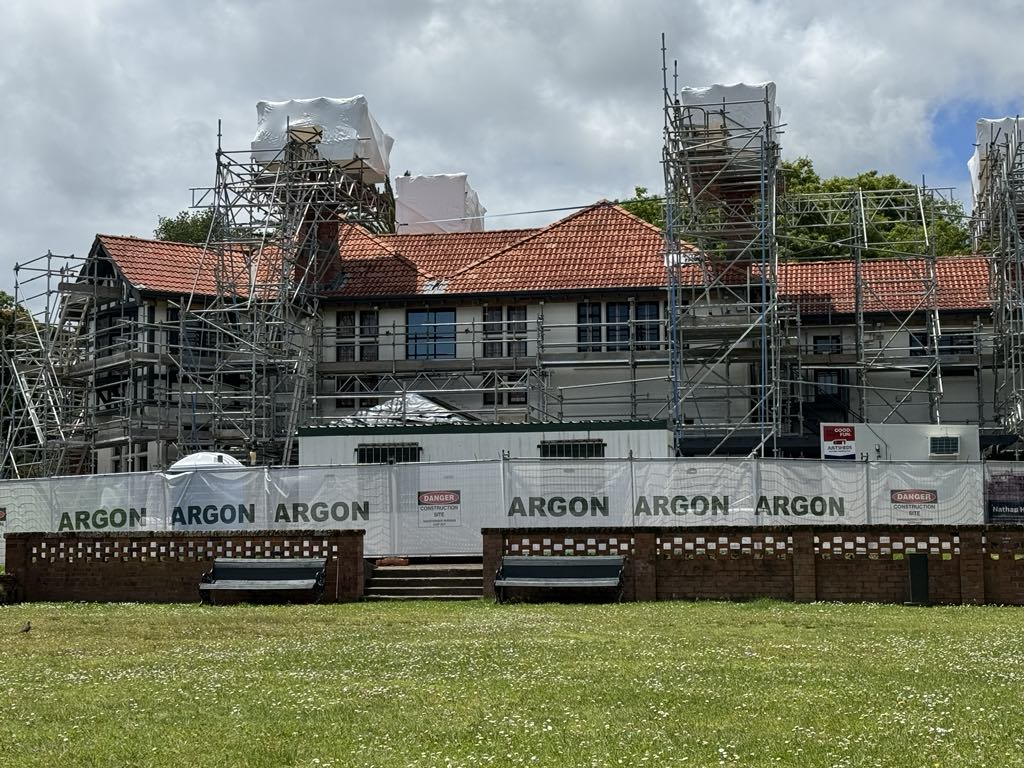
Exterior view of Nathan Homestead undergoing renovations, 24 November 2024

Nathan Homestead served as council offices until 1977 when a new purpose-built council building opened in Wiri. In 1978, the homestead underwent extensive restoration costing $140,000, led by architect Brian Northcott. This work included removing office partitions, restoring oak paneling in the foyer and staircase, and adding leaded lattice window panes and antique door handles to enhance the building's historic character.

On 14 October 1978, the homestead was officially reopened by Arts Minister David Allan Highet as the Manurewa Community and Cultural Centre. Since then, it has hosted a wide range of activities, exhibitions, events, and cultural displays, becoming a hub for community engagement.

As of July 2024, Nathan Homestead is undergoing significant renovations under Auckland Council's renewals programme, with renovations scheduled to finish in July 2025. The upgrades include fire safety and emergency lighting improvements, better accessibility features, seismic strengthening, and the installation of an interior lift to ensure the building meets modern standards while preserving its historical significance.

== Architecture and Design ==
=== The Homestead ===
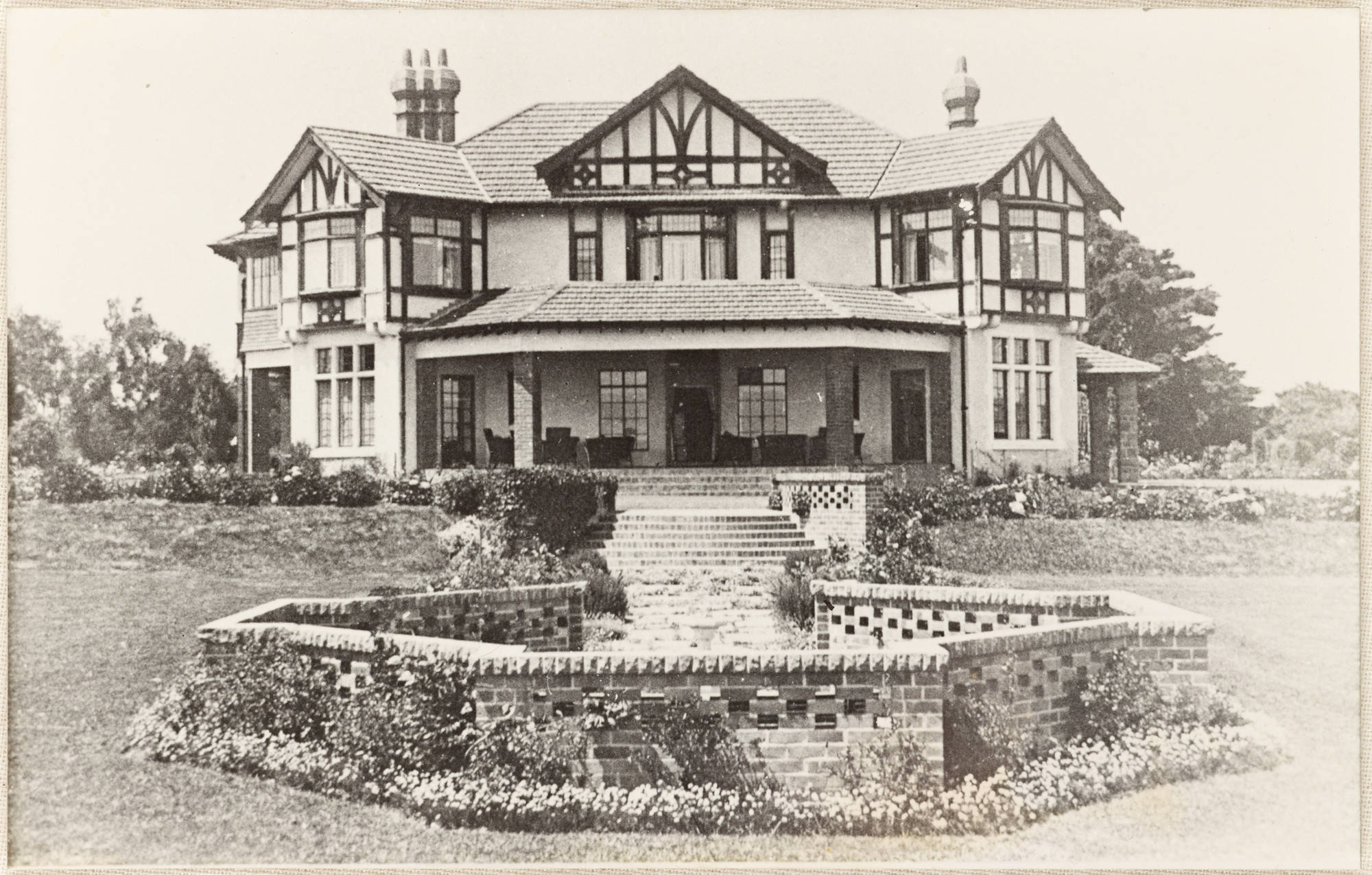
This circa 1935 view of The Hill, the Nathan family's residence in Manurewa, shows the front of the house. The covered terrace, with its northern exposure, overlooks the lawns

Nathan Homestead, designed by Auckland architect Daniel B. Patterson and constructed between 1923 and 1925, is an architecturally significant residence blending Tudor, Arts and Crafts, and Bungalow influences. The structure incorporates hallmark features such as half-timbered gables, tall brick chimneys, and faceted bay windows with lead-lights. The interior reflects the bungalow style, with panelled timberwork, exposed beams, and sleeping balconies.

To prevent a recurrence of the 1923 fire, the house was constructed using cavity brickwork with a brushed render finish. It also emphasizes harmony with its surrounding garden, including features like deep terraces and balconies with scenic views. The formal walled garden aligns with the north façade, further integrating the home with its environment.

Key architectural details include a hipped and gabled terracotta tile roof with four prominent brick chimneys and half-timbered bays on the north and east sides. The east-facing bay features enclosed sleeping balconies clad in terracotta shingles. Verandahs on the north and east sides have tiled concrete floors and brick piers, while a stone-supported portico shelters the main entrance. The southern service wing is simpler, with a recessed porch providing access.

The house is oriented to maximize northern sunlight and eastern shelter. The ground floor is constructed of brick, while the first floor features timber-framed, plaster-lined walls. Timber floors and roof framing complete the structure. The main reception areas open to a north-facing verandah, while secondary rooms connect to an east-facing colonnade-style verandah.

=== The Water Tower ===
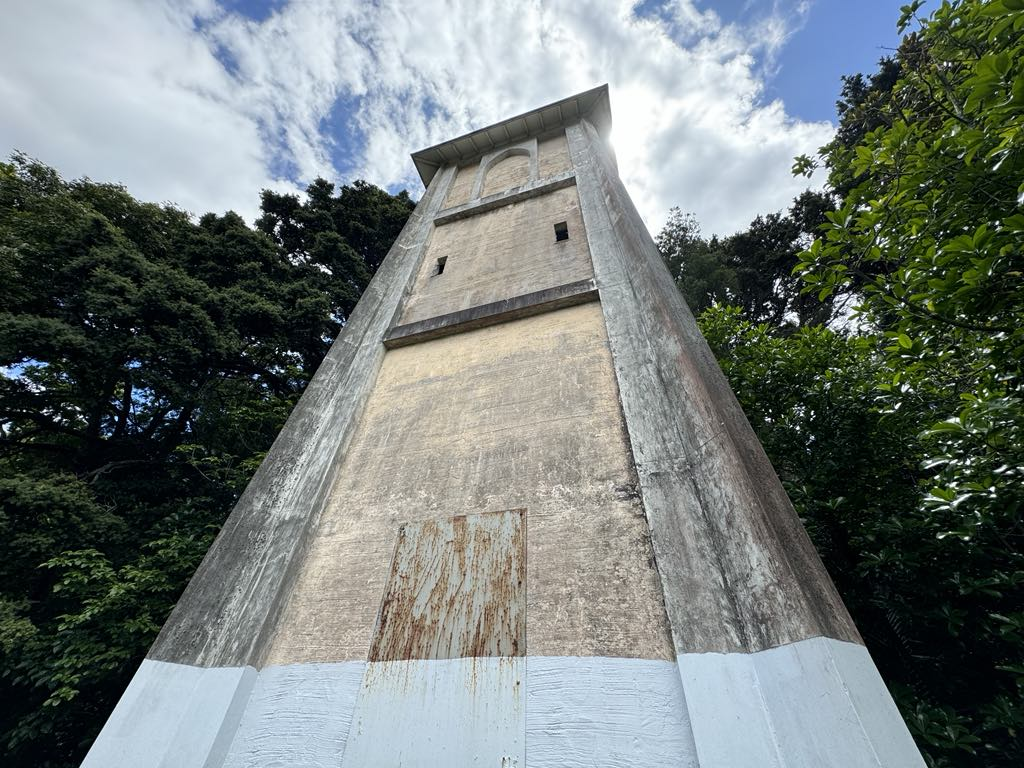
A view of the exterior of the Nathan Homestead Water Tower from its base, 24 November 2024

The Water Tower, designed by Daniel B. Patterson and constructed alongside Nathan Homestead, was inspired by a postcard image of a Norman church tower. The structure is a square measuring 4.5 meters per side and standing 14.8 meters high. Its architectural features include buttressed piers at each corner and decorative concrete bands on all four faces. The upper band has pointed arch panels, while the middle band includes small ventilation openings. At the base, a door on the south side and louvered vents on the other sides provide ventilation, though these have been sealed to prevent entry.

The tower is finished with terracotta-colored plaster, with contrasting light grey plaster highlighting the corner buttresses, horizontal bands, and arch panels. It is capped by a hipped roof with flared eaves and exposed rafters, topped with a weathervane in the shape of a kiwi.

=== The Garden and Landscape ===
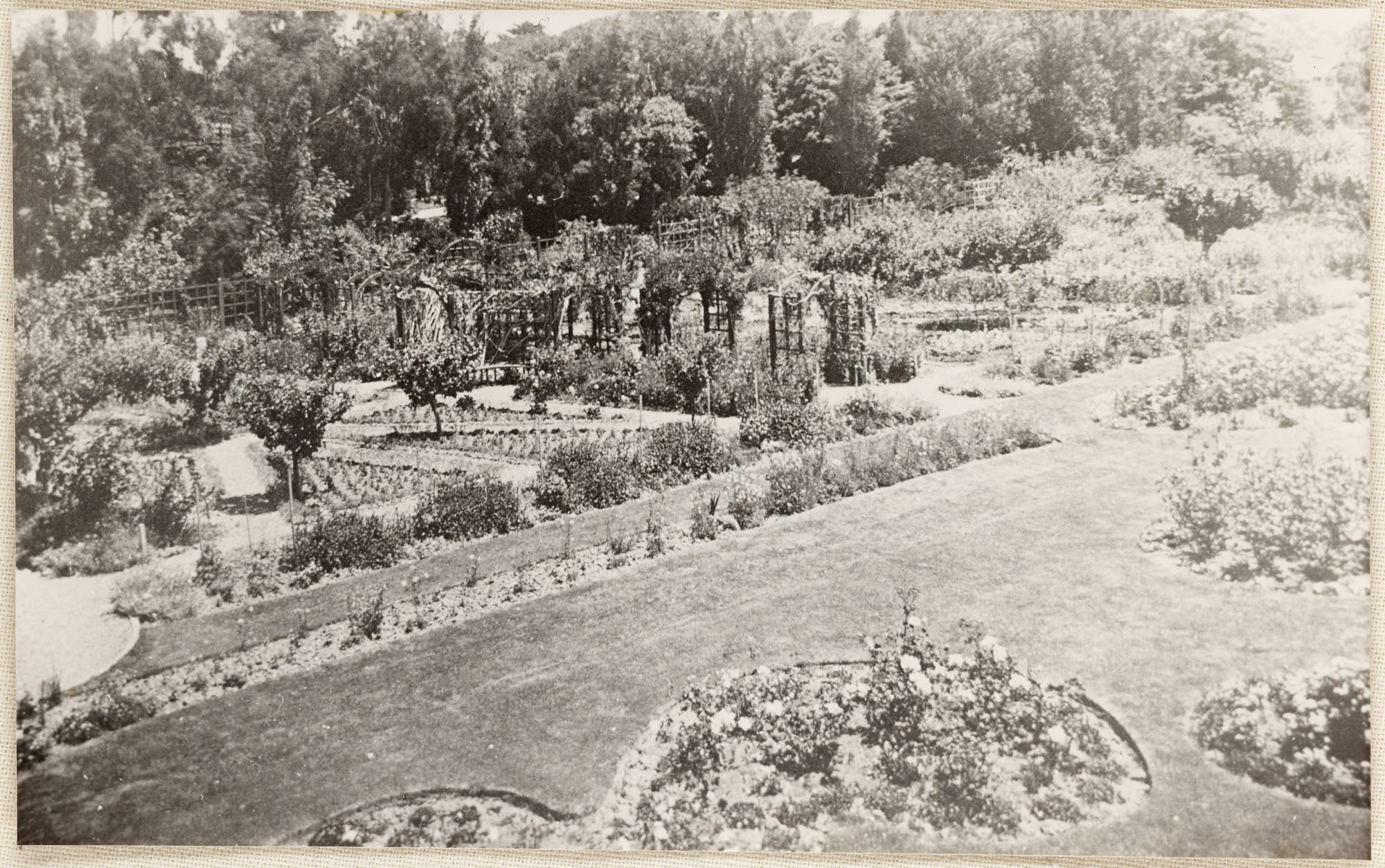
View of the gardens at The Hill, circa 1935. This is the view from the window on the eastern side of the house, overlooking the carefully planned rose and formal gardens.

The garden surrounding Nathan Homestead, developed from 1910 by David Laurence Nathan, was originally a blend of Edwardian, Arts and Crafts, Gardenesque, and Tudor influences. Situated on a portion of Nathan's extensive farm, the garden integrated pastoral and bush settings, offering expansive views across the farmland. The landscape design incorporated open spaces and dense plantings, evoking the style of an English park.

In the early 1960s, as part of the subdivision of land surrounding the homestead, the Nathan family decided to offer the house and eight acres of its gardens and bush to the Manurewa Borough Council. The gardens at that time included a variety of plantings, with notable features such as a rock garden, ponds, and formal garden beds.

However, over the years, the gardens underwent significant changes. In the 1960s and 1970s, with the development of the surrounding area and the repurposing of the homestead for council use, many elements of the garden were altered or removed. Key features such as the rock garden, pond, and sections of the formal garden were filled in or replaced with lawns, in line with the changing needs of the property.

By the 1980s, the homestead became part of the David Nathan Park Community Centre, and additional alterations to the garden space occurred. New buildings and infrastructure were added, and parts of the garden were redesigned for community use.

== Gallery ==
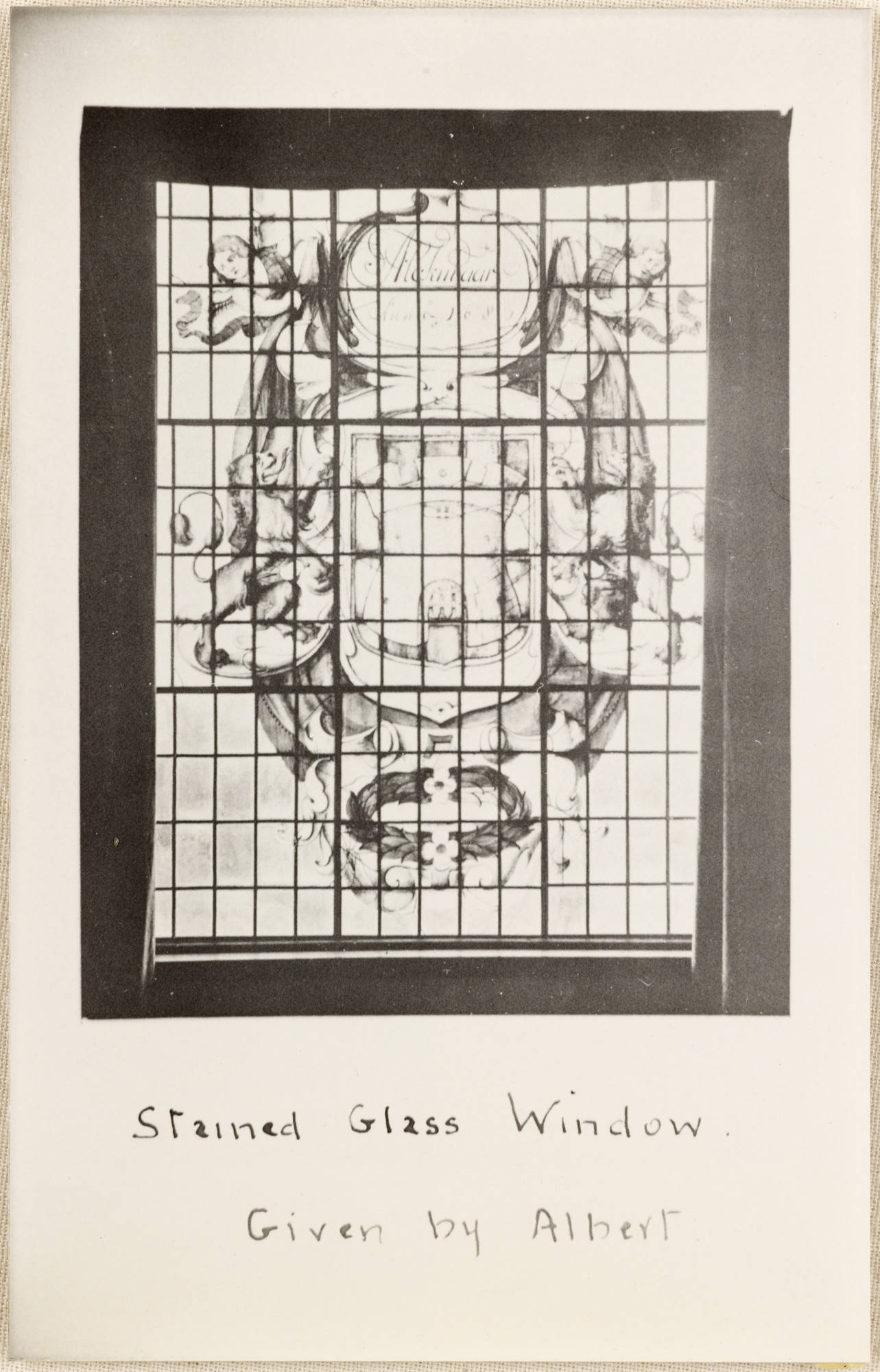
Stained glass window, The Hill, Manurewa, 1930s

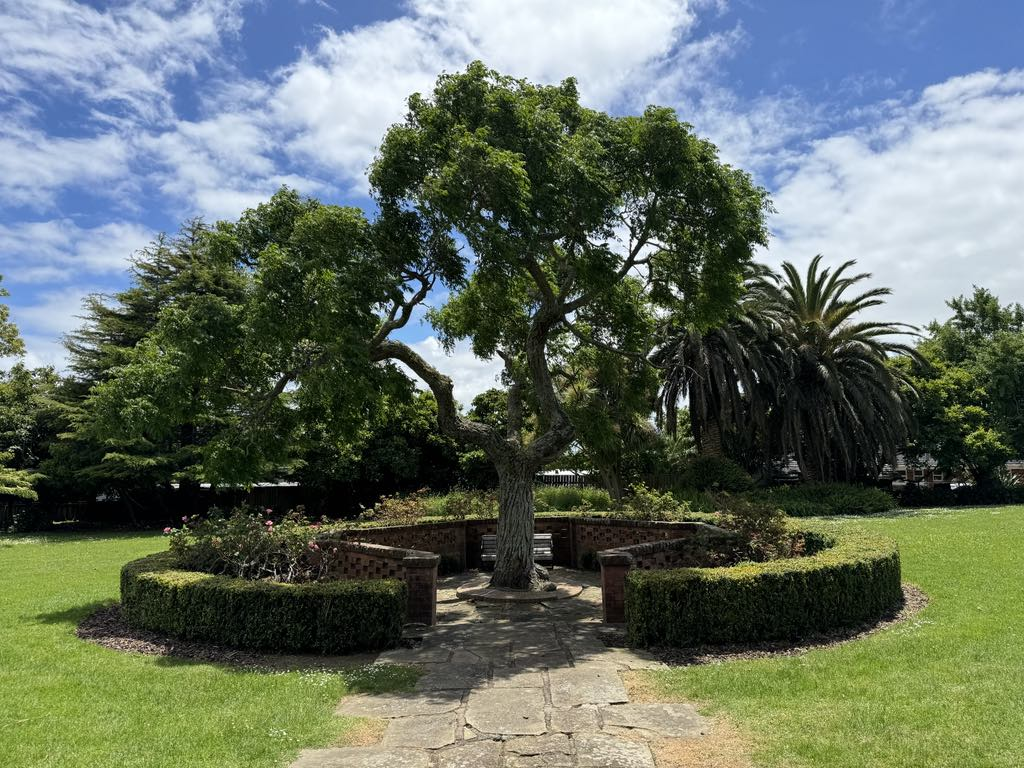
A view of the Octagonal garden at Nathan Homestead, 24 November 2024

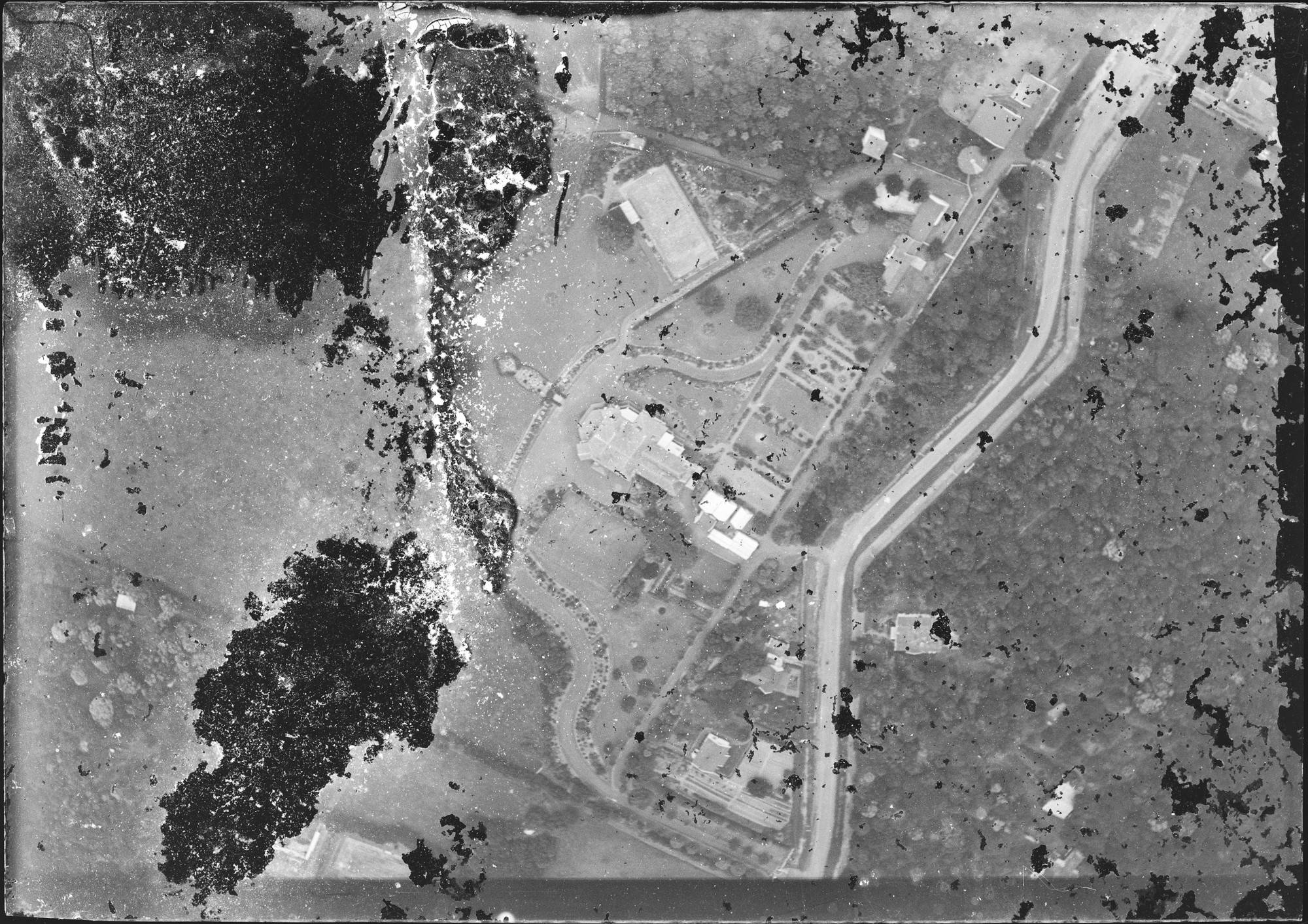
Aerial view of The Hill, Manurewa, circa 1930's

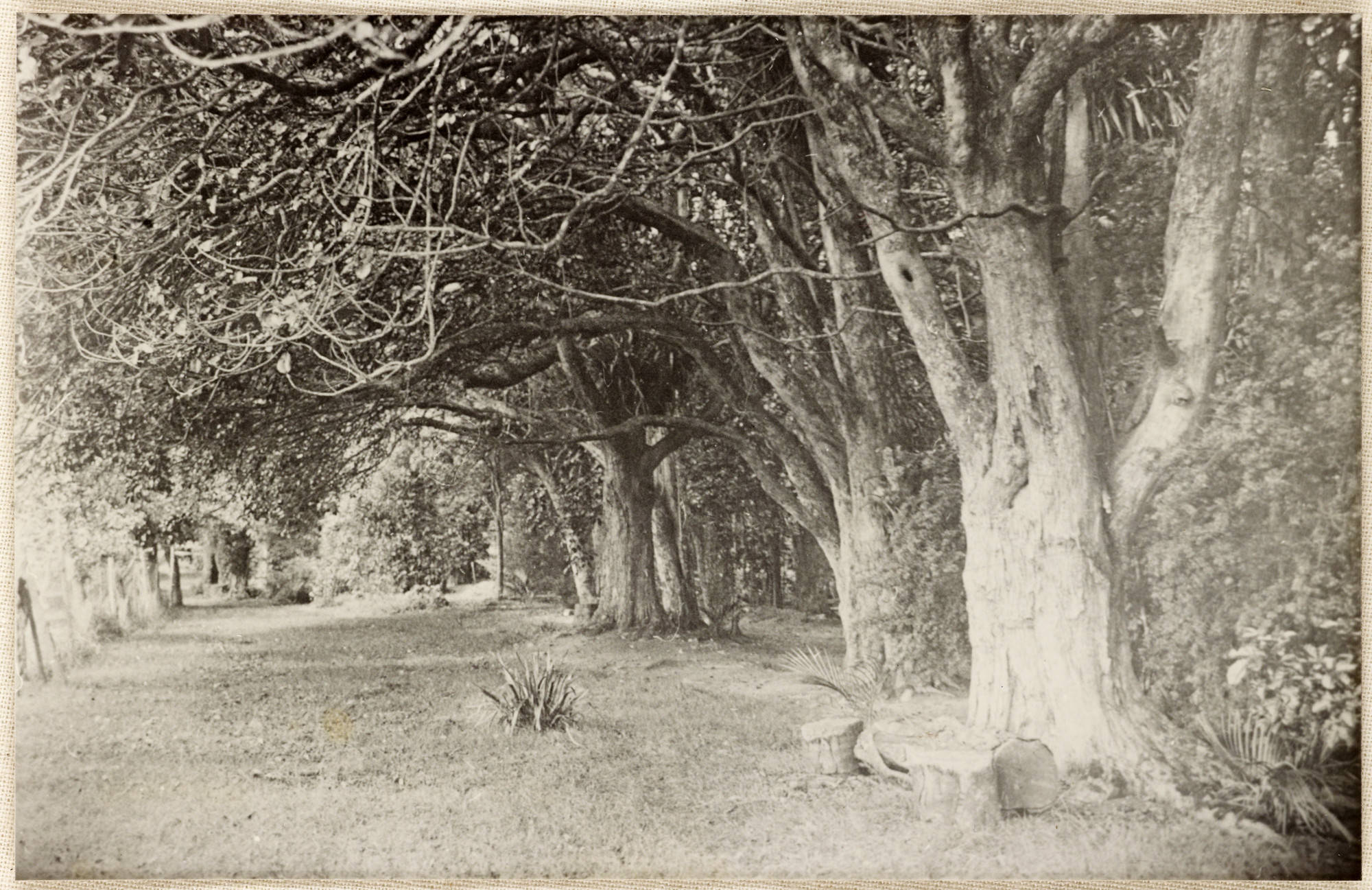
Grass walk under old puriri trees in the grounds of The Hill, Manurewa, circa 1935

== Bibliography ==
- Matthews & Matthews Architects Ltd. (2019). David Nathan Park and Homestead Conservation Plan. Prepared for Auckland Council and Manurewa Local Board, July 2019. PDF.
- Auckland Council – Community Services Division. (2016). David Nathan Park and Homestead Strategic Business Plan 2016–2026. Prepared for Auckland Council, March 2016. Retrieved 26 November 2024. PDF.
- Nathan, Lawrence D. (1984). As old as Auckland: the history of L.D. Nathan & Co. Ltd. and of the David Nathan family, 1840-1980. Takapuna, N.Z.: Benton Ross. ISBN 0908636903 (hbk.).
- Nathan, David Lawrence (1982). Nathan Homestead, 1925-1982: Reminiscences by Lawrence David Nathan. Manurewa: Manurewa Historical Society.
- Ringer, Bruce (2012). Countryside in the City - A History of Totara Park Manurewa. Papatoetoe, Auckland: Auckland Communities Foundation. ISBN 978-0-473-19493-2.
- Ringer, Bruce (2021). Naming Manurewa - Place and Street Names in Manurewa, Weymouth and Wiri. Manurewa, Auckland: Manurewa Historical Society. ISBN 978-0-473-59363-6.
- Watkin, Jocelyn (2010). From Paddocks to People: Manukau City Council 1965-2010. Manukau, Auckland: Manukau City Council. ISBN 978-0-473-17402-6.
- Wichman, Gwen. (2001). Soaring Bird: A History of Manurewa to 1965. ISBN 0-473-07114-2.
- New Zealand Government; Te Ākitai Waiohua. (12 November 2021). Te Ākitai Waiohua and Te Ākitai Waiohua Settlement Trust and the Crown: Deed of Settlement of Historical Claims. Retrieved 26 November 2024. PDF.
- Moore, D., Rigby, B., & Russell, M. (1997). Rangahaua Whānui National Theme A: Old Land Claims. First release, July 1997. Waitangi Tribunal, Rangahaua Whānui Series. Retrieved 26 November 2024. PDF.
