= Manurewa High School =

- Te Kura Tuarua o Manurewa

Location
- 67 Browns Road; Manurewa; Auckland 2102; New Zealand; 37.0099°S 174.8825°E

Information
- Type: State co-ed secondary (year 9–13)
- Motto: Māori: Piki Atu ki te Rangi (English: Aim High, Strive for Excellence, lit. 'Climb away, towards the Heavens')
- Established: 1960
- Ministry of Education Institution no.: 99
- Principal: Pete Jones
- Enrolment: 2,384 (July 2026)
- Socio-economic decile: 1C
- Website: manurewa.school.nz

Manurewa High School is a secondary school in Manurewa, South Auckland, New Zealand. It is a large multi-cultural school, with an enrolment of over 2,300 students.

== History ==
Manurewa High School was opened on 2 February 1960. Prior to this, students in Manurewa needed to travel to schools outside the area, such as Otahuhu College. The high school was opened next to Homai School (then known as Manurewa North School), and a row of trees was planted between the two campuses to create a boundary. The school buildings were built to the linear school building plan, a plan only adopted by three schools (including Onehunga High School).

The school began with a roll of 126 students, but due to the growth in the area the school needed to add seven classrooms to the school by 1963. Night classes for adults were also held at the school, and were so popular that in 1960 there were more adult students attending night classes than students in the daytime. The school began holding large-scale school fairs from 1961, in order to fundraise for the school.

== Demographics ==
Manurewa High School is a multi-cultural school. In 2025, 51% of its students were Pasifika, 33% were Māori and 13% were Asian.

As of July 2026, Manurewa High School has a roll of 2,384 students, of which 674 (28.3%) identify as Māori.

As of 2026, the school has an Equity Index of 508, placing it amongst schools whose students have many socioeconomic barriers to achievement (roughly equivalent to deciles 2 and 3 under the former socio-economic decile system).

The Homai College for the Blind which is within walking distance of Manurewa High School. Blind and Visually Impaired students are placed in normal classroom environments and are assisted through the provisioning of specialised equipment and resources (such as Braille versions of textbooks), and staff trained to meet their special needs are available. This allows the students to participate fully in the school curriculum without any significant segregation.

== Notable alumni ==
- Bundee Aki – Counties Manukau Steelers, Waikato Chiefs and the Ireland National Rugby Team
- Kelsey Bevan – Olympic Rowing Silver Medalist, World Champion and World Record Holder in the Women's Coxless Four
- Mark Cooksley – All Black
- Greg Eastwood – rugby league player
- Henry Fa'afili – rugby league player
- Tim Nanai-Williams – NZ Secondary Schools Rugby, NZ Sevens, Counties Manukau Steelers, Waikato Chiefs and Samoa Sevens
- Wendy Petrie – TV newsreader
- Jim Richards (racing driver) – three times Australian Touring Car Champion, seven times Bathurst winner
- Jocelyn Lees – New Zealand shooter, Olympian, Commonwealth Games Medallist
- Daryl Tuffey – New Zealand fast bowler
- John Walker – athlete, Olympic gold medalist
- Erin Clark – Rugby League player, Warriors, Canberra Raiders, Samoan Rugby League Team, Gold Coast Titans
- Aroha Savage – New Zealand Black Ferns
- Jawsh 685 – music producer
- Ata Mariota - Rugby League player, Canberra Raiders
