= Manurewa =

- Suburb
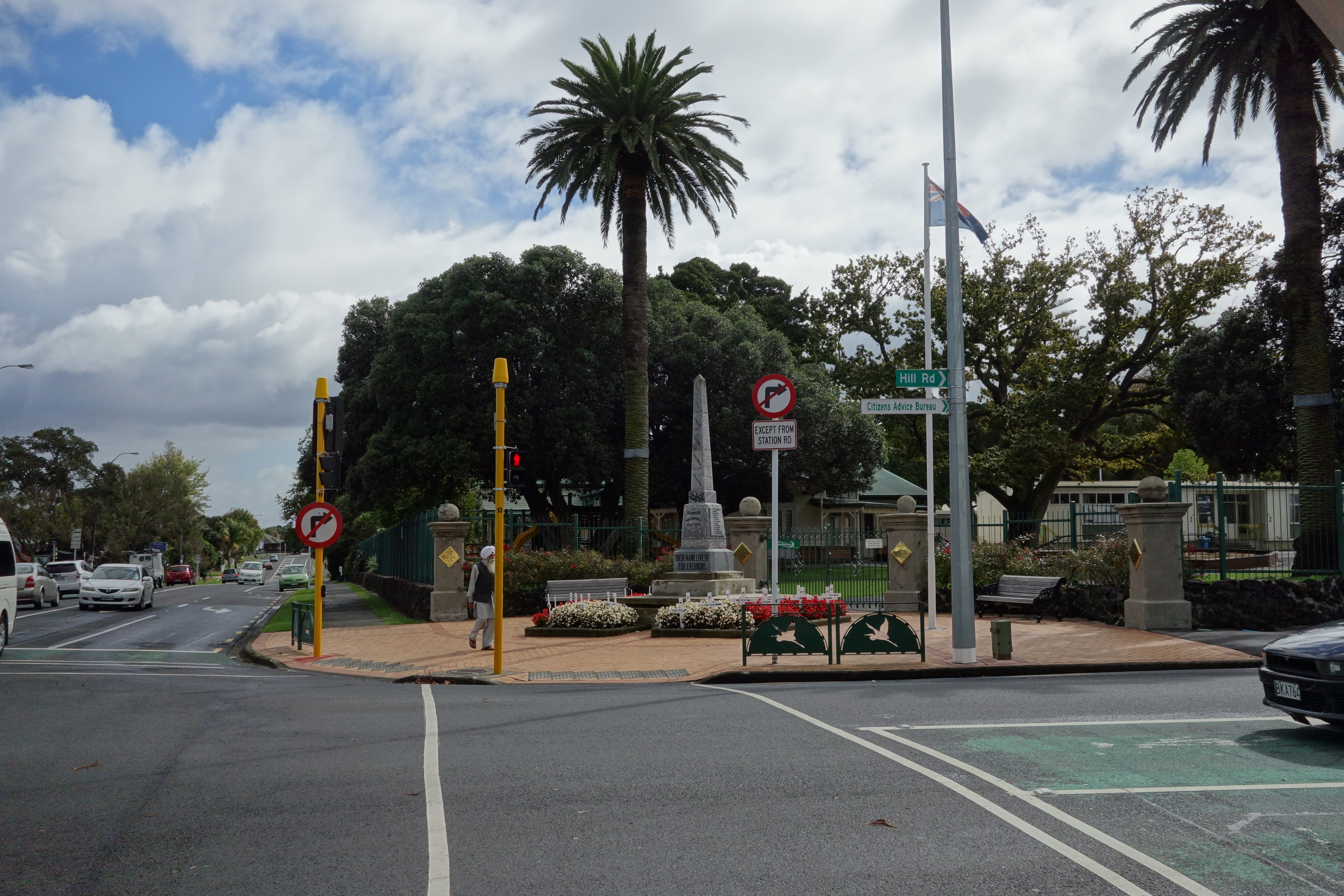
- The Manurewa First World War Memorial
- Interactive map of Manurewa
- Coordinates: 37°01′25″S 174°53′56″E
- Country: New Zealand
- City: Auckland
- Local authority: Auckland Council
- Electoral ward: Manurewa-Papakura ward
- Local board: Manurewa Local Board

Area
  - Land: 841 ha (2,080 acres)

Population (June 2025)
  - Total: 40,820
  - Density: 4,850/km^{2} (12,600/sq mi)
- Train stations: Manurewa Train Station; Te Mahia Railway Station

Homai	Hillpark, Manukau Central	The Gardens
Clendon Park	Manurewa	Randwick Park
Weymouth	Wattle Downs	Takanini

Manurewa (Māori pronunciation: [manʉɾɛwa]) is a suburb in South Auckland, New Zealand, located 6 km (3.7 mi) south of Manukau Central, and 26 km (16 mi) southeast of the Auckland City Centre. It is home to the Auckland Botanic Gardens, which receives over a million visitors a year. Manurewa has a high proportion of non-European ethnicities, making it one of the most multi-cultural suburbs in New Zealand. Employment for many is at the many companies of nearby Wiri, Papakura, and at the steel mill at Glenbrook.

The area has been inhabited since at least the 13th century, and has cultural significance for Ngāti Te Ata Waiohua. Manurewa developed as a rural community after the Manurewa railway station opened in 1875, becoming a borough in 1937. The area saw suburban growth in the 1950s and 1960s, and became a shopping hub when Southmall Manurewa opened in 1967.

== Etymology ==
The name Manurewa is a variant of the Māori word for "kite", manu aute, used by in local Waiohua dialect. The translation "soaring bird" gained popularity in the 1920s among English speakers. The name is a shortened form of Te Manurewa o Tamapahore ("The Drifted-away Kite of Tamapahore"), a name which recalls a story involving Waiohua ancestor Tamapahore. One day the men who lived at Matukutūruru and Matukutūreia decided to fly kites, and Tamapahore's was the kite that flew the highest. His brother Tamapahure caused the chord of Tamapahore's kite to break. Tamapahore left the area in search of his valuable kite, eventually finding it at Whenuakite on the Coromandel Peninsula.

== Geography ==
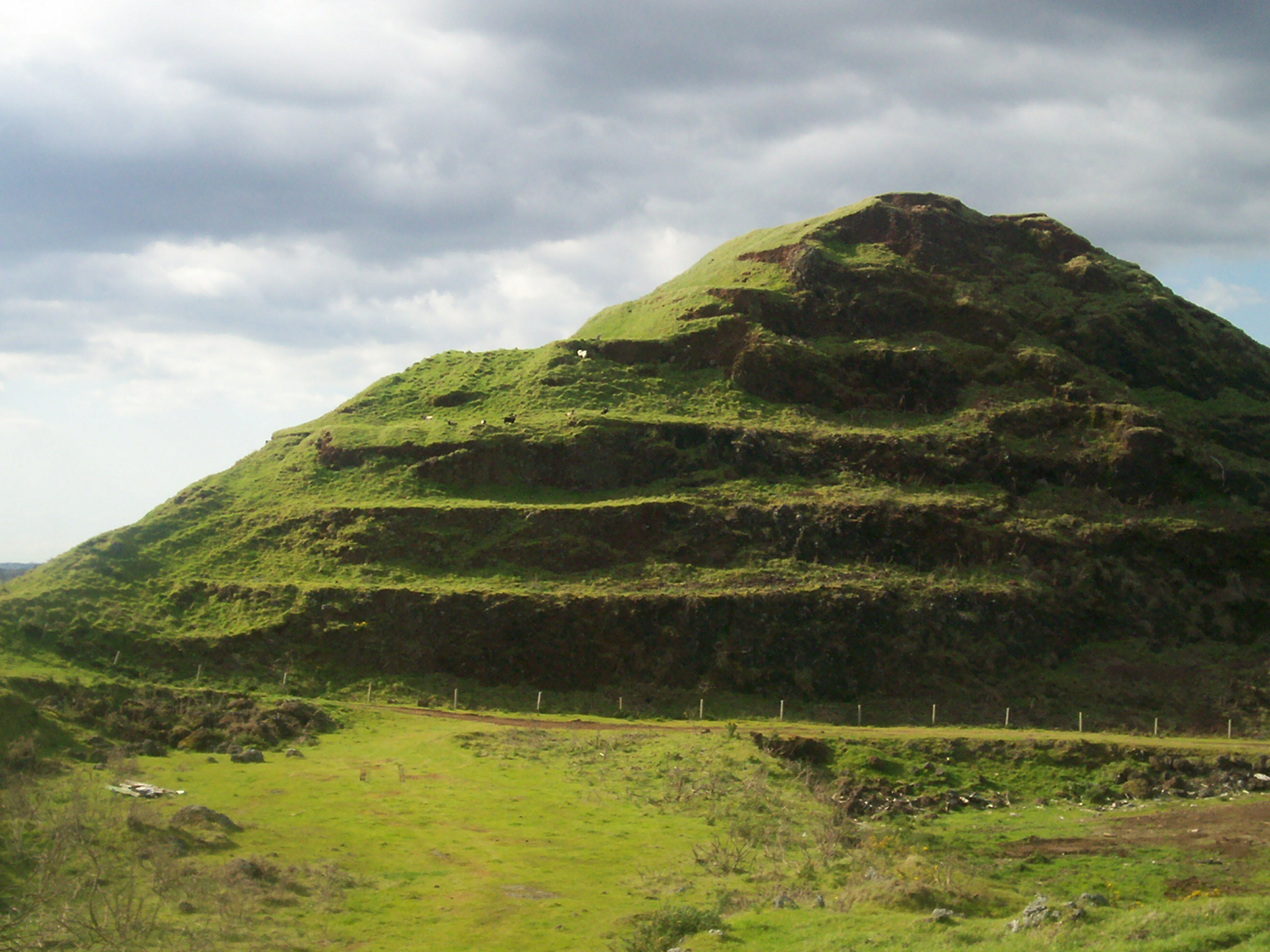
Terraces on Matukutūreia

Manurewa is located in South Auckland, inland from the south-eastern Manukau Harbour, north of the Pahurehure Inlet. Manurewa is south of the Puhinui Creek, and north of the Papakura Stream. Manurewa is at the southern border of the Auckland volcanic field. Two volcanoes are located to the north in Wiri: Matukutūreia (also known as McLaughlins Mountain), which erupted an estimated 48,000 years ago, and Matukutūruru (Wiri Mountain), which erupted an estimated 30,000 years ago. Matukutūruru was quarried, primarily by the New Zealand Railways Corporation.

== History ==
=== Māori history ===
Matukutūreia and Matukutūruru were home to two hilltop pā, collectively known as Matukurua. The names of the mountains commemorate a story of two chiefs. The chief of Matukutūruru ("the bittern standing at ease") was captured while eel fishing. The chief of Matukutūreia ("the vigilant bittern") saved the pā and the people of Matukutūruru. Over 8,000 hectares of stonefield gardens were tended by Tāmaki Māori peoples on the lower slopes of the volcanoes, where crops such as kūmara and bracken fern root were grown.

The Manurewa area was settled by Ngā Riki, who were one of the three Tāmaki Māori groups who joined to form the Waiohua in the 17th and 18th-centuries. During this time, the two pā were home to the Ngāi Huatau hapū of Waiohua, settled by Huatau, daughter of Huakaiwaka. The chief Huarangi was based at Matukutūruru with his wife Takawai of Ngāi Tahuhu. After her death, he married Kohe, a high ranking woman from Ngāti Pāoa, a union that was widely disapproved by the hapū. This dissent eventually led to a division in the family, with the children of Takawai settling at Matukutūruru, and Huarangi moving with Kohe to Matukutūreia.

Around the year 1740, a conflict between Ngāti Whātua and Waiohua led to the death of paramount chief Kiwi Tāmaki, who became the main occupants of the Tāmaki isthmus and Māngere to the north. Ngāti Whātua was significantly smaller than the Waiohua confederation and chose to focus life at Onehunga, Māngere and Ōrākei, meaning that Waiohua were able to re-establish a presence in South Auckland.

The Manurewa area has significance for Waiohua iwi, especially Ngāti Te Ata Waiohua, who descent from Te Ata i Rehia, the daughter of Huatau who was born on Matukutūreia, and Te Ākitai Waiohua.

=== Colonial era ===
Clendon's Grant. Granted to James Reddy Clendon Extent of the Fairburn Purchase

In January 1836 missionary William Thomas Fairburn brokered a land sale between Tāmaki Māori chiefs, Pōtatau Te Wherowhero and Turia of Ngāti Te Rau, covering the majority of modern-day South Auckland between Ōtāhuhu and Papakura. The sale was envisioned as a way to end hostilities in the area, but it is unclear what the chiefs understood or consented to. Māori continued to live in South Auckland, unchanged by this sale.

Fairburn was criticised for the sheer size of the purchase, and in 1842 the Crown significantly reduced the size of his land holdings, and the Crown partitioned much of the land for European settlers.

10,000 acres of the Fairburn purchase was granted to James Reddy Clendon in return for land at Russell where the new capital of New Zealand was established. Clendon never lived or visited the area, but sold 2,000 acres to the Martin brothers, who subdivided the land in the mid-1900s. Much of the Martin brothers' land became modern-day Manurewa.

=== Early development ===
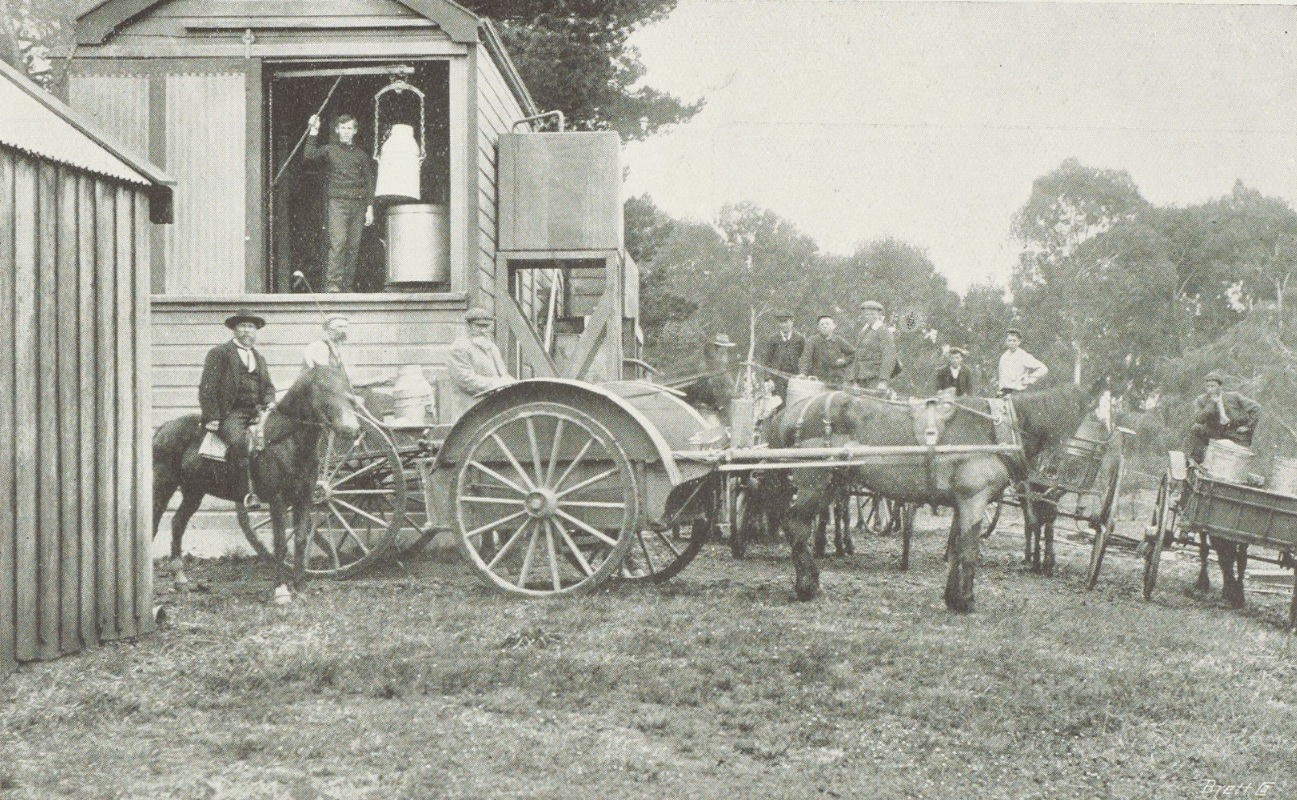
Opening of the Manurewa Creamery in 1905

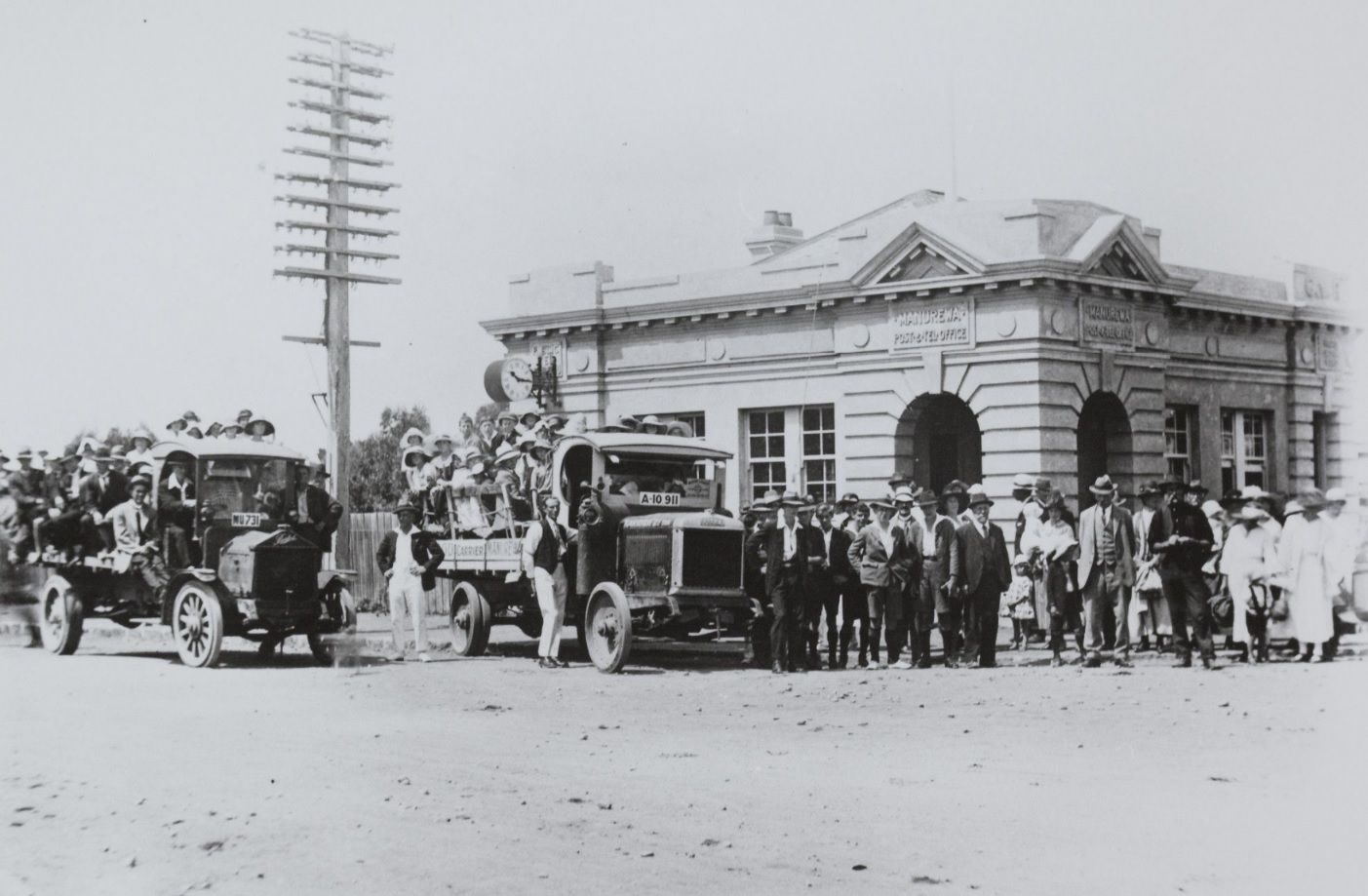
A day-trip excursion leaving from the Manurewa Post Office in the 1920s

Work on the Great South Road began in 1843, reaching as far south as Drury in 1855. In the early 1860s, Great South Road was used as a military supply route between Auckland and the frontier of the Invasion of the Waikato.

Manurewa was only sparsely populated in the 1860s and 1870s. The main stop on the Great South Road for coach services was the Raglan Hotel at Woodside (modern-day Wiri).

The Manurewa Highway District was formed in 1867, and in 1875 the first Manurewa railway station opened located behind what is now the Russell Road Reserve. Initially opened as a flag station, in 1884 a booking office opened at the site. The station led to growth in the area; 81 people lived in Manurewa by 1879, and a post office opened in 1884.

By the 1900s, much of Woodside village (modern-day Wiri) had moved to Manurewa. After years of debate, the school now known as Manurewa Central School moved from the corner of Kerrs Road and Great South Road to its current site, and opened on 8 September 1906 with 63 pupils. It was joined by the Methodist Church in 1909.

Manurewa became a centre for the local dairy industry in the early 20th century, with the first creamery opening in 1905.

=== Suburban development ===
By 1915, Manurewa had grown large enough to become a town district, created from parts of the former Manurewa and Papakura road districts. The area was promoted as a commuter suburb for Auckland in the early 1920s. Local farmer Charles Henry Lupton was instrumental in developing the Manurewa community, serving on the town board, school and church committees, and became known as "The Father of Manurewa". By 1937, the population of Manurewa had increased to over 1,500 people, allowing Manurewa to become a borough.

The second railway station in the area opened on 15 August 1924. The developer John Dreadon donated £500 and land for the station and the bridge, which replaced a level crossing. Three other landowners also contributed. As a result, it was decided to name the station using the Māori word for 'gift', homai, rather than Browns Rd, as it was initially referred to.

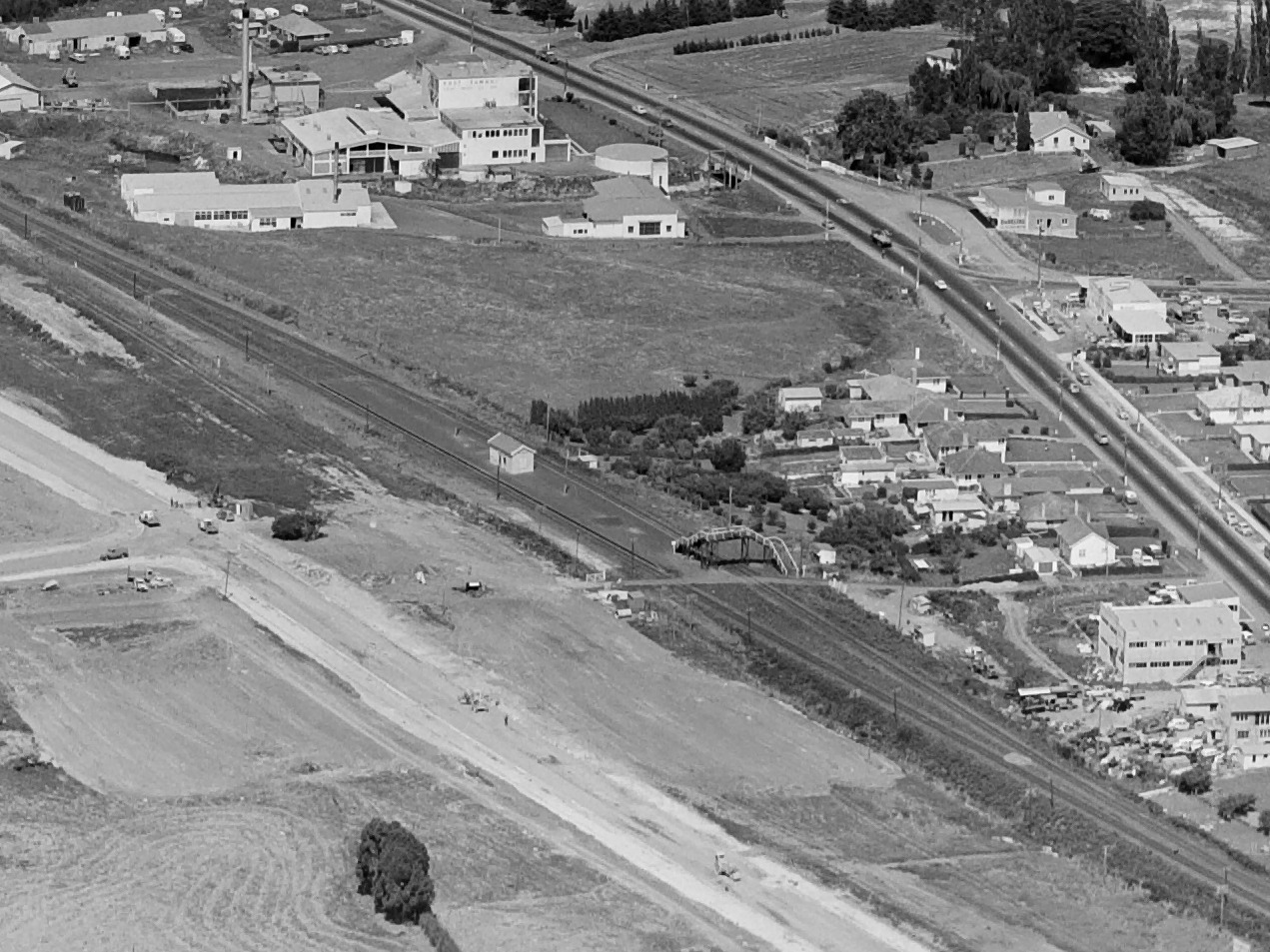
Oblique aerial photograph of Te Mahia railway station, 1963

A third railway station, Mahia, was opened on 16 August 1926. It was renamed from Mahia to Te Mahia from 9 February 1951 by a decision of the New Zealand Geographic Board.

Duplication of the tracks between Papatoetoe and Papakura, through Manurewa, started in 1929 as an employment relief scheme and was completed on 29 March 1931.

In 1939, a fire destroyed the Manurewa Picture Theatre, and the adjoining shops and boarding house. In 1941 a fire engine was obtained and a new fire station was built by volunteers of the Manurewa Fire Brigade.

During World War II, parts of Manurewa were used as military camps for United States Army soldiers bound for the Pacific.

=== Urban development ===
The development of the Auckland Southern Motorway in the 1950s and 1960s led to suburban development in Manurewa.

During the large population growth in the 1950s, Manurewa Central School struggled to provide places for all of the students who needed places. Because of this, a number of new schools were established in the area. St Anne's Catholic School opened in 1952; initially with two classrooms and a teachers' room, but by April 1955 additional buildings were added to cope with the growth in students. Homai School opened with six classrooms in April 1955 under the name Manurewa North School.

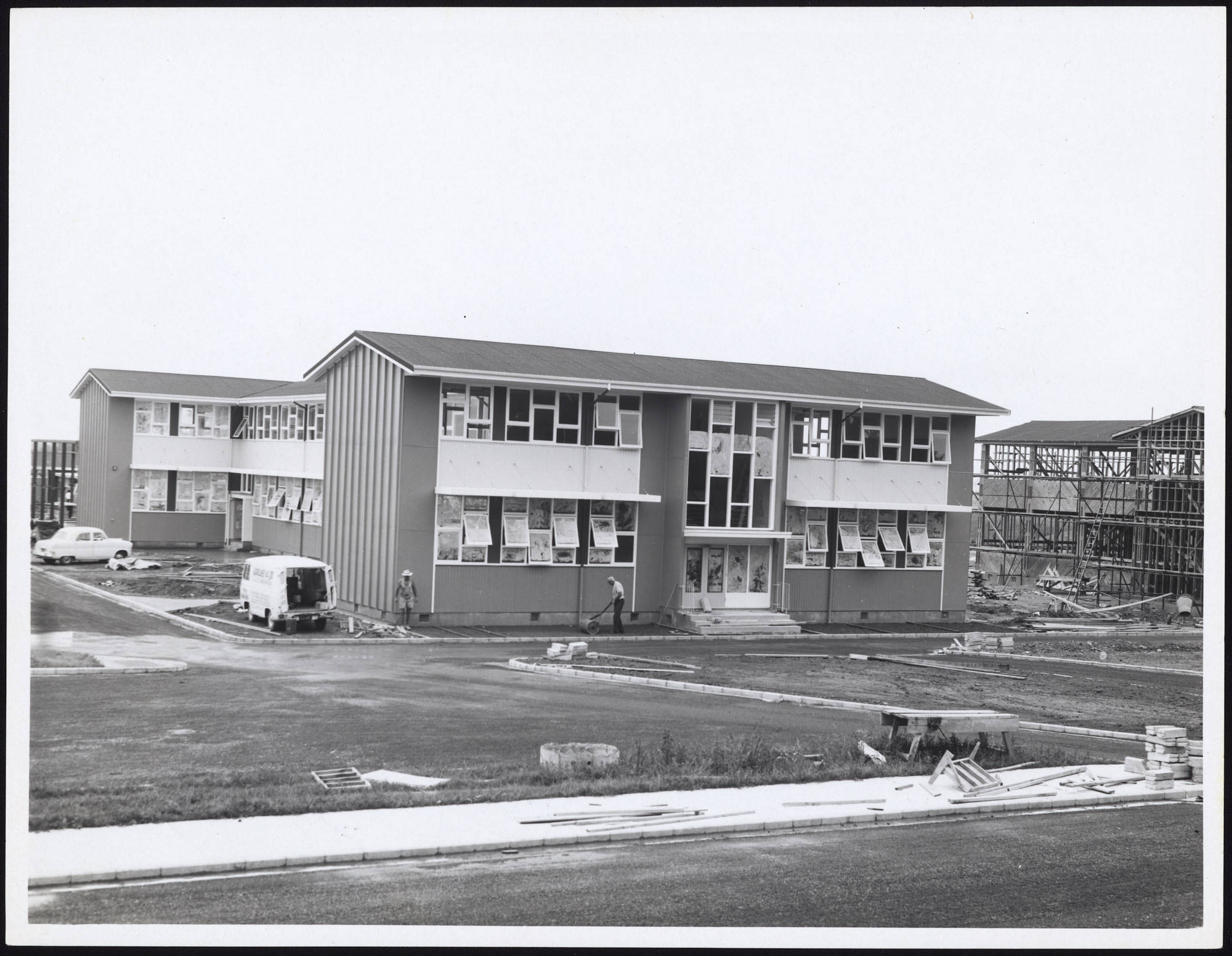
James Cook High School (now Te Haikura a Kiwa) under construction in January 1968

Manurewa High School was opened on 2 February 1960, built on land adjacent to Homai School. A row of trees was planted between the sites, to create a defined boundary between the two. Prior to this, high school students in Manurewa needed to travel to schools outside the area, such as Otahuhu College. James Cook High School (now Te Haikura a Kiwa) opened in 1968.

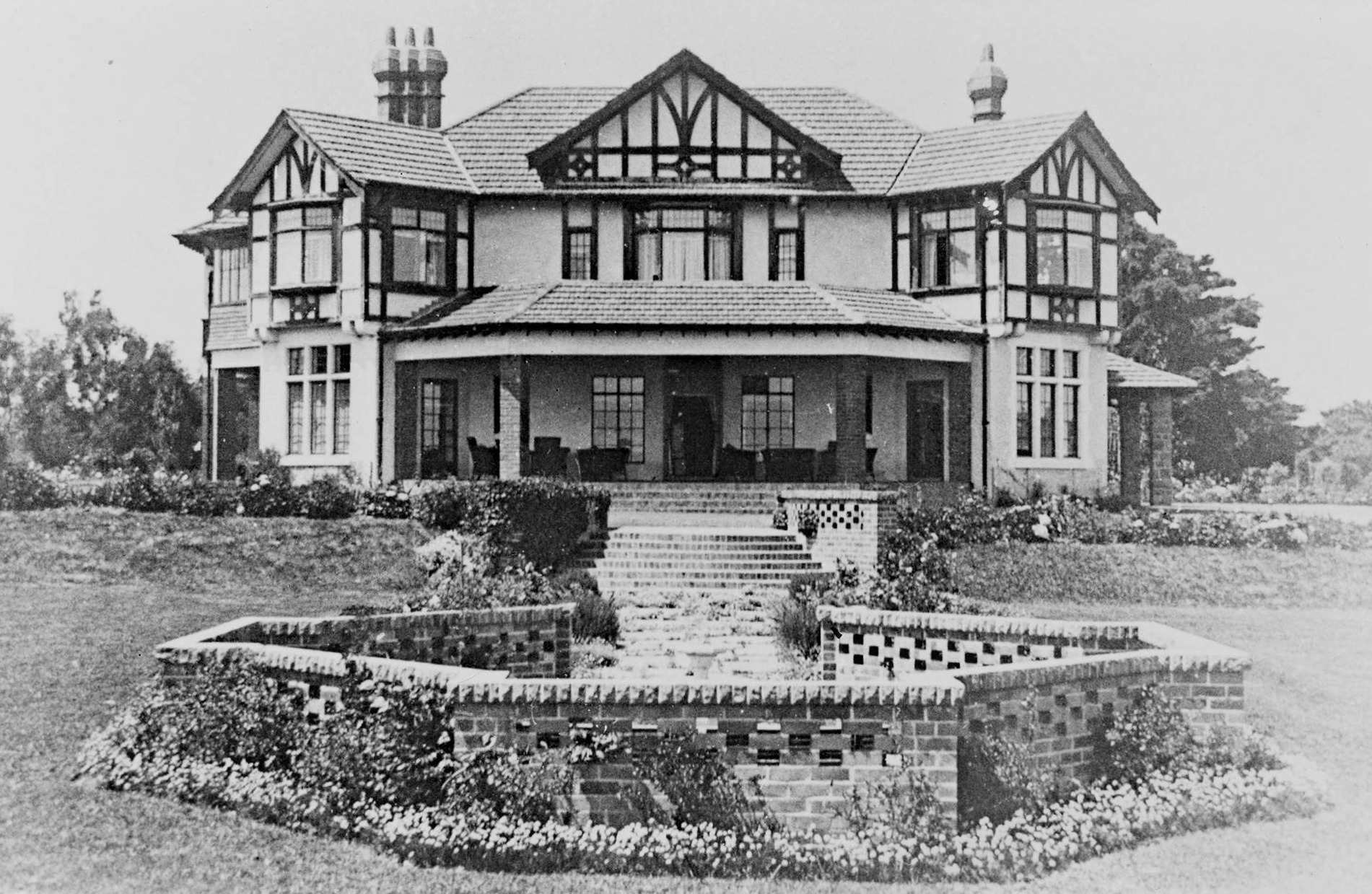
Circa 1935 view of The Hill, the Nathan family's residence in Manurewa

In 1962 the Nathan family granted their old homestead and surrounding land to the Manurewa Borough Council. The Council named the area David Nathan Park. In 1964, the Borough Council leased the homestead, now known as Nathan Homestead, to the Manukau County Council for use as administrative offices.

Southmall Manurewa, an open-air mall, was opened in February 1967. The complex included over 100,000 square feet of retail space, with Bond & Bond, Farmers, Flackson's, Hannah's, Hugh Wright's, Levene's, New World, Whitcombe & Tombs, Woolworths and several other major retail chains, as well as a variety of speciality shops.

In May 1967, Manukau City Council joined with the Auckland Regional Authority to purchase the remaining 209-acres (84.6 ha) of the Nathan farm. The family sold part of the farm to the Auckland Regional Authority for the creation of the Auckland Botanic Gardens, while the remainder was given to the Manukau City Council for recreational use. The gardens opened in 1982.

Nathan Homestead served as council offices until 1977 when a new purpose-built council building opened in Wiri. On 14 October 1978, the homestead was officially reopened by Arts Minister David Allan Highet as the Manurewa Community and Cultural Centre.

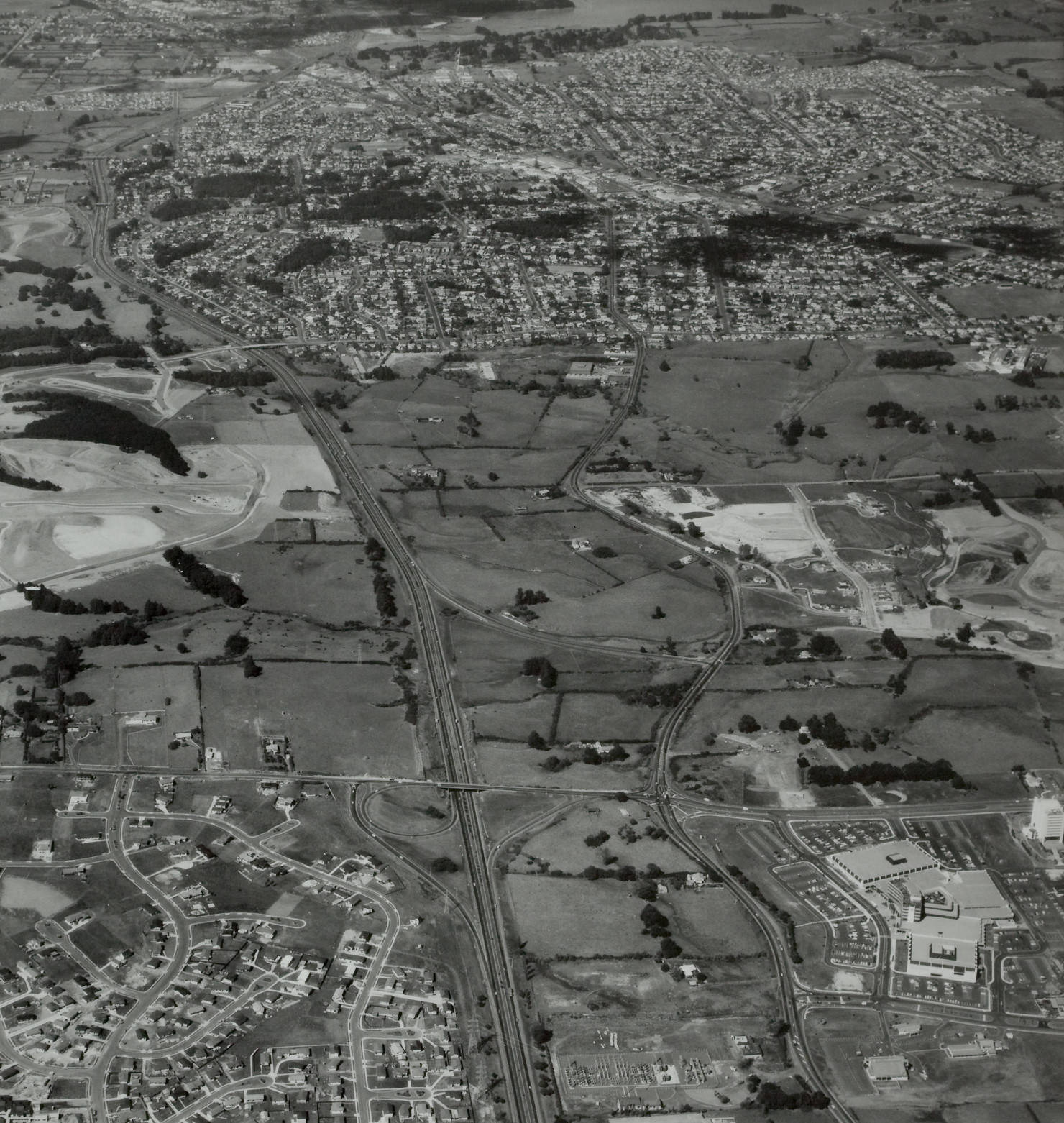
1978 aerial photo looking south along the Southern Motorway towards Manurewa. The newly developed Manukau City Centre mall can be seen to the lower right. The earthworks are for the Goodwood Heights and Totara Heights subdivisions on the left, and Housing Corporation development on the right.

By the 1970s, Manurewa East and Weymouth had developed as suburban areas, and after the construction of Manukau Central in the 1980s, Manurewa became connected to the urban sprawl of Auckland.

In 1972, the Manukau City Centre mall was built in Wiri. Shortly after its redevelopment in 1986, Southmall was extensively remodeled and redesigned from an open air to an enclosed space.

== Demographics ==
Manurewa covers 8.41 km^{2} (3.25 sq mi) and had an estimated population of 40,820 as of June 2025, with a population density of 4,854 people per km^{2}.

Historical population
Year	Pop.	±% p.a.
2006	27,339	—
2013	29,229	+0.96%
2018	34,074	+3.11%
2023	35,739	+0.96%

Manurewa had a population of 35,739 in the 2023 New Zealand census, an increase of 1,665 people (4.9%) since the 2018 census, and an increase of 6,510 people (22.3%) since the 2013 census. There were 17,844 males, 17,793 females and 105 people of other genders in 9,111 dwellings. 2.2% of people identified as LGBTIQ+. The median age was 29.1 years (compared with 38.1 years nationally). There were 9,264 people (25.9%) aged under 15 years, 9,225 (25.8%) aged 15 to 29, 14,544 (40.7%) aged 30 to 64, and 2,706 (7.6%) aged 65 or older.

People could identify as more than one ethnicity. The results were 18.6% European (Pākehā); 28.1% Māori; 46.3% Pasifika; 24.6% Asian; 1.8% Middle Eastern, Latin American and African New Zealanders (MELAA); and 0.8% other, which includes people giving their ethnicity as "New Zealander". English was spoken by 90.0%, Māori language by 7.2%, Samoan by 16.1%, and other languages by 23.0%. No language could be spoken by 3.1% (e.g. too young to talk). New Zealand Sign Language was known by 0.4%. The percentage of people born overseas was 37.8, compared with 28.8% nationally.

Religious affiliations were 46.4% Christian, 7.8% Hindu, 2.9% Islam, 3.0% Māori religious beliefs, 1.4% Buddhist, 0.2% New Age, and 4.8% other religions. People who answered that they had no religion were 27.4%, and 6.4% of people did not answer the census question.

Of those at least 15 years old, 3,021 (11.4%) people had a bachelor's or higher degree, 12,621 (47.7%) had a post-high school certificate or diploma, and 10,827 (40.9%) people exclusively held high school qualifications. The median income was $35,000, compared with $41,500 nationally. 894 people (3.4%) earned over $100,000 compared to 12.1% nationally. The employment status of those at least 15 was that 13,032 (49.2%) people were employed full-time, 2,229 (8.4%) were part-time, and 1,617 (6.1%) were unemployed.

Individual statistical areas
Name	Area (km^{2})	Population	Density (per km^{2})	Dwellings	Median age	Median income
Burbank	0.65	3,750	5,769	804	27.1 years	$31,000
Homai East	0.60	2,985	4,975	807	30.6 years	$38,500
Homai West	0.48	2,589	5,394	603	27.5 years	$33,300
Homai Central	0.54	3,120	5,778	840	28.4 years	$36,600
Rowandale West	0.69	3,579	5,187	810	27.0 years	$33,400
Rowandale East	0.83	4,050	4,880	948	27.9 years	$36,000
Manurewa Central	1.08	3,783	3,503	1,116	32.5 years	$34,500
Leabank	1.22	2,976	2,439	774	28.8 years	$32,300
Manurewa East	0.83	3,102	3,737	876	31.2 years	$35,200
Manurewa West	0.61	2,931	4,805	759	29.0 years	$37,500
Manurewa South	0.89	2,871	3,226	780	28.7 years	$35,400
New Zealand					38.1 years	$41,500

== Sport and recreation ==
=== Rugby union ===
The Manurewa Rugby Football Club is based at Mountfort Park Manurewa. They were founded in 1921 and now play within the Counties Manukau Rugby Union Club competition and are one of the biggest and most successful Rugby clubs within the region. They have a large junior section plus and string Golden Oldies Section made up of many past players. They also have associated sports of AFL, Netball & Softball operating within the club. They were originally based at Jellicoe Park in Manurewa and had a club room affectionately known as the "Old Black Shed". They built the new clubrooms at Mountfort Park and moved to this site officially in 1978. Notable current Super 15 Chiefs players Tim Nanai-Williams, Viliami Taulani and Bundee Aki are former Manurewa Rugby Club players.

=== Association football ===
The football (soccer) club Manurewa AFC who play in the Lotto Sport Italia NRFL Division 1A are based in Manurewa.

=== Rugby league ===
The Manurewa Marlins are based in Manurewa.

== Local government ==
The first local government in the area was the Manurewa Highway District, which formed in 1867. It dissolved either 1916 or 1917. By 1915, Manurewa had grown large enough to become a town district within the Manukau County, and by 1937 it became a borough. On 3 September 1965, the Manukau County and Manurewa Borough merged to form Manukau City. In November 2010, all cities and districts of the Auckland Region were amalgamated into a single body, governed by the Auckland Council.

Manurewa is a part of the Manurewa local board area. The residents of Manurewa elect a local board, and two councillors from the Manurewa-Papakura ward to sit on the Auckland Council.

=== Chairmen of the Manurewa Town Board ===
Below is a list of the six people who served as the chairman of the Manurewa Town Board.

- 1916–1918 Thomas James Corin
- 1918–1920 Charles Henry Lupton
- 1920–1922 Thomas James Corin
- 1922–1928 Arthur Clifton Axford Sexton
- 1928–1930 George Gallaher
- 1930–1932 William Johnston Ferguson
- 1932–1937 William Thomas Cox

=== Mayors during Manurewa Borough Council ===
Below is a list of the six people who served as the mayor of the Manurewa Borough Council.

- 1937–1944 William Johnston Ferguson
- 1944–1946 Frederick Herny Barnard
- 1946–1948 John Augusta Kelly
- 1948–1953 Reginald Frank Judson
- 1953–1956 Cecil Millington Crawford
- 1956–1965 Harry Beaumont

== Notable places ==
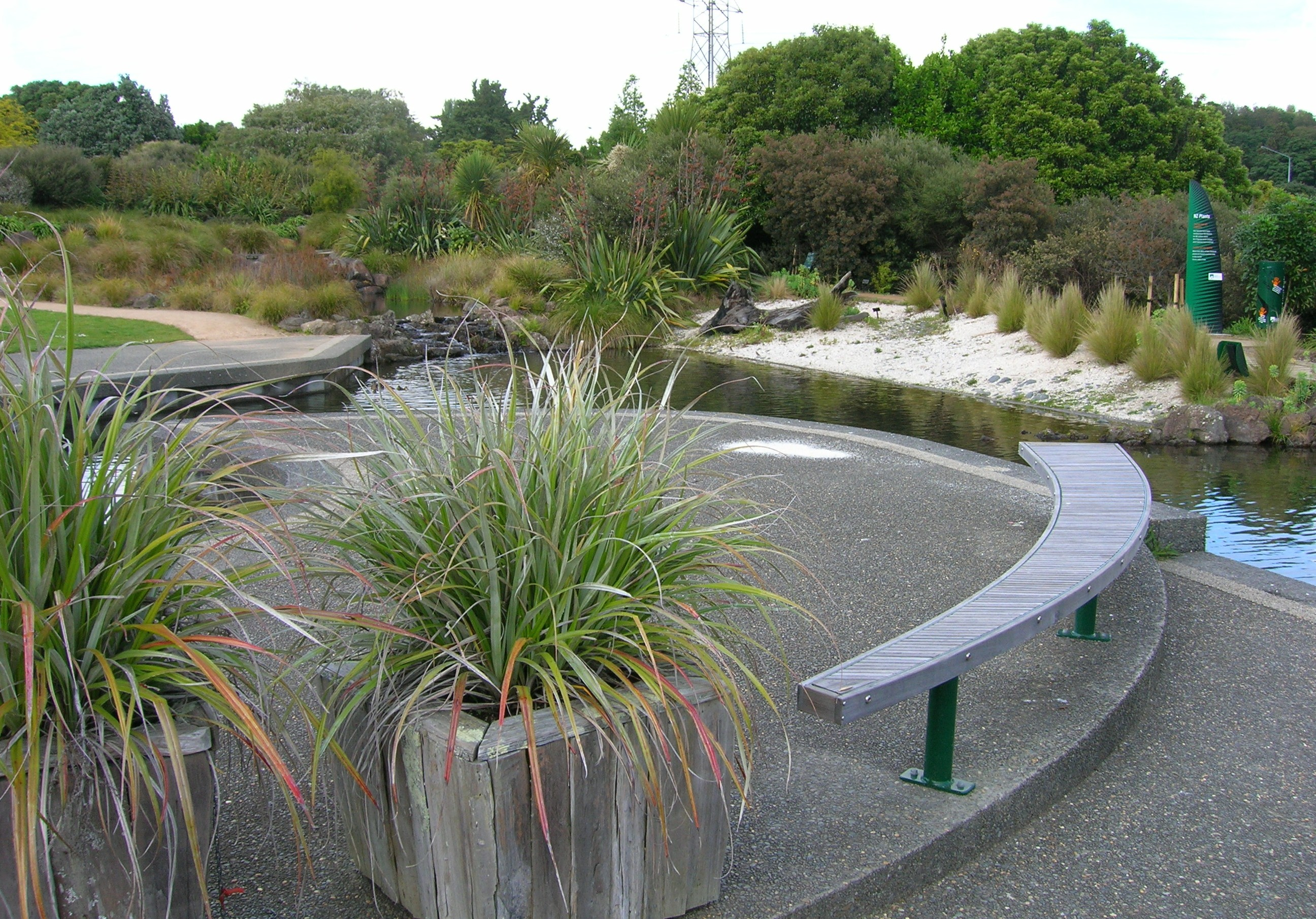
The Auckland Botanic Gardens

- Auckland Botanic Gardens
- Jellicoe Park, home to Manurewa Amateur Athletics & Harriers Club and Jellicoe Park Tennis Club
- Gallaher Park, home to the Manurewa Scout Hall, Gallaher Park Touch and Alfriston Road Playcentre
- Manurewa Pool and Leisure Centre
- Manurewa Marae in Clendon Park
- Nathan Homestead is a historic homestead constructed in 1924. The building was designed by Daniel B Patterson with Basque influences. The homestead served as the offices for the Manurewa Borough Council after purchasing the property in 1964. The home's garden has been a park since 1974. The building has served a community centre following the vacation of the building by the Borough Council and in 2024 it started a $6.3 million renovation for earthquake strengthening.
- Southmall Manurewa, and the surrounding Manurewa town centre.
- Te Pae Maumahara / Manurewa War Memorial Park, home to Manurewa AFC and the Homai Bowling Club

== Religion ==
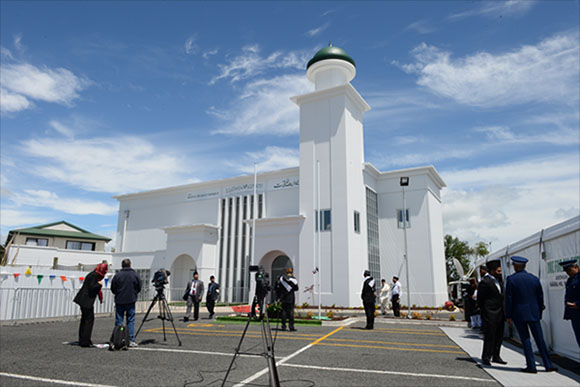
Baitul Muqeet Mosque, an Ahmadi Muslim mosque in Manurewa

- Baitul Muqeet Mosque, an Ahmadi Muslim mosque that was built in 2013.
- Manurewa Methodist Church, which moved from Witi to Manurewa in 1909.
- The Manurewa Nanaksar gurdwara, a large Sikh temple.
- St Andrews Presbyterian Church, established in 1927.
- St Anne's Catholic Church, established in 1927.
- St Luke's Anglican Church, which was established in 1910.
- Wat Khemaraphirataram, a Cambodian Buddhist temple that opened in 2018.

== Education ==
The first school in Manurewa was the Manurewa Central School, which began as the Woodhill School in Wiri, and was moved in 1906.

Manurewa High School was opened in 1960, as the first high school located in the Manurewa area. Te Haikura a Kiwa is a secondary school (years 9–13) with a roll of 1,867. Manurewa Intermediate is an intermediate school (years 7–8) with a roll of 929. Greenmeadows Intermediate is an intermediate school (years 7–8) with a roll of 347.

Finlayson Park School, Leabank School, Manurewa Central School, Manurewa East School, Manurewa South School, Manurewa West School and Rowandale School are contributing primary schools (years 1–6) with rolls of 931, 389, 502, 388, 379, 434 and 564 students, respectively. In 2020 Finlayson Park School in Auckland became the first school in New Zealand to set up a Kiribati language unit, where Erika Taeang was employed as the teacher.

St Anne's Catholic School is a state-integrated full primary school (years 1–8) with a roll of 493. Notable alumni includes libertarian politician Stephen Berry.

Manukau Christian School is a private composite school (years 1–13) with a roll of 314.

All these schools are coeducational. Rolls are as of July 2026.

== Bibliography ==
- Nathan, David Lawrence (1982). Nathan Homestead, 1925-1982: Reminiscences by Lawrence David Nathan. Manurewa: Manurewa Historical Society.
- Ringer, Bruce (2012). Countryside in the City - A History of Totara Park Manurewa. Papatoetoe, Auckland: Auckland Communities Foundation. ISBN 978-0-473-19493-2.
- Ringer, Bruce (2021). Naming Manurewa: Place and Street Names in Manurewa, Weymouth and Wiri. Manurewa Historical Society. ISBN 978-0-473-59363-6.
- Watkin, Jocelyn (2010). From Paddocks to People: Manukau City Council 1965-2010. Manukau, Auckland: Manukau City Council. ISBN 978-0-473-17402-6.
- Wichman, Gwen (1990), A brief history of Manurewa, Manurewa: Manurewa Historical Society, Wikidata Q117327773
- Wichman, Gwen (2001). Soaring Bird: a History of Manurewa to 1965. Manurewa: Manurewa Historical Society. ISBN 0-473-07114-2. Wikidata Q117421984.
