= St Anne's Catholic School =

School in Manurewa, New Zealand

Location
- 124 Russell Road, Manurewa, Auckland 2102; 37.021108°S 174.882432°E

Information
- Type: State-integrated Co-Ed Full Primary (Year 1-8)
- Ministry of Education Institution no.: 1486
- Principal: Glen Ryan
- Enrolment: 493 (July 2026)
- Socio-economic decile: 2
- Website: stanne.school.nz

St Anne's Catholic School is a state-integrated Catholic full primary school (years 1–8) in Manurewa, a suburb of South Auckland, New Zealand.

== History ==
St Anne's Catholic Church opened on 29 May 1927, serving the Catholic community of South Auckland between Ōtāhuhu and Papakura. By the early 1950s, Bishop James Liston wanted to develop a convent school at the church. The school opened on 24 February 1952 as the second school established in Manurewa, opening to relieve pressure on Manurewa Central School after major suburban growth in the area. The first school children were taught by the Sisters of Mercy, who lived in a convent beside the school.

Originally the school opened with two classrooms and a teachers' room, but by April 1955 additional buildings were added to cope with the growth in students. The school roll climbed from 112 in 1955 to 349 in 1961. Demand for places at the school greatly outweighed the available spots, and in 1961 the Confraternity of Christian Doctrine (CCD) was established to cater for students in the parish who were unable to attend St Anne's. At its peak, over 400 students across the parish attended night classes.

In 1983, the school was integrated into the state schooling system.
