= Manurewa Central School =

Location
- Hill Road, Manurewa, Auckland; 37.0203°S 174.8959°E

Information
- Type: State Co-Ed Contributing (Year 1-6)
- Motto: Latin: Per Ardua Ad Astra "Effort Brings Reward"
- Ministry of Education Institution no.: 1354
- Principal: Michelle Dibben
- Enrolment: 502 (July 2026)
- Socio-economic decile: 3
- Website: mancent.school.nz

Manurewa Central School is a Primary School (years 1–6) in Manurewa, a suburb of South Auckland, New Zealand. Manurewa Central has celebrated its 100-year school reunion on October 20–22, 2006.

== History ==
The school began operating from the mid-1850 in Wiri, then known by the name Woodside. The Woodside School operated from the Methodist church, until school buildings were built on the corner of Kerrs Road and Great South Road in 1873.

In 1875, the Manurewa railway station opened, causing the township of Woodside to slowly decline while Manurewa grew. After years of debate, the school moved to its current site, and opened on 8 September 1906. Originally opening with 63 pupils, this had grown to 250 by 1920, and 500 students by 1930. As Manurewa was primarily a rural area, many students rode to school on horseback.

A long-serving teacher, Mr. McNaughton, planted a grove of native trees along the school's north-western boundary. An oak tree was planted at the school in the early 1920s, which became a major feature of Manurewa Central School.

An explosion in growth in Manurewa led to the addition of prefabricated classrooms in the 1940s and 1950s, and the school's swimming pool was opened in 1940. By the 1950s and 1960s, growth in the area led to the opening of many new schools in Manurewa to ease the pressure on Manurewa Central School.

== School policies ==
Manurewa Central is a Duffy Books in Homes school which provides five or more free books to students annually. Each year, eight year 6 students are chosen to be 'School Councillors'. These school councillors help run the school and organize fun activities for other students to do like; Funtime Lunchtime, Wheels Day, Black out day etc. They support the students in their learning, sports and their future.
