= Manurewa railway station =

Train station in Auckland, New Zealand

Manurewa
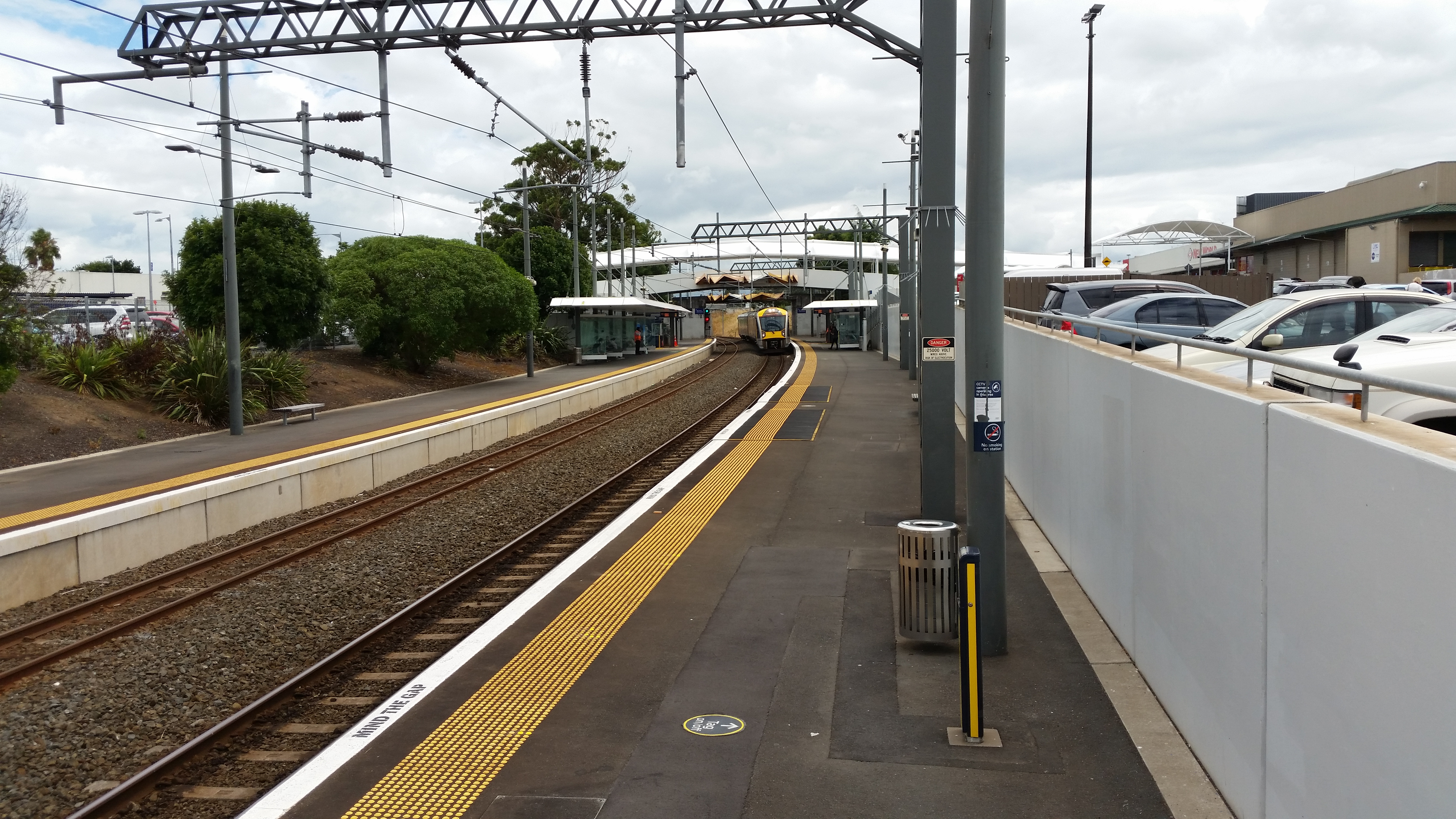
- The station in January 2018, seen from the south from the southbound platform

General information
- Location: Manurewa, Auckland; New Zealand
- Coordinates: 37.023478°S 174.896485°E
- System: Auckland Transport Urban rail
- Owner: KiwiRail (track and platforms); Auckland Transport (buildings)
- Operator: Auckland One Rail
- Line: North Island Main Trunk
- Distance: 653.49 km (406.06 mi) from Wellington
- Platforms: Side platforms (P1 & P2)
- Tracks: Mainline (2)

Construction
- Parking: Yes
- Cycle facilities: Yes
- Accessible: Yes

Other information
- Fare zone: Southern Manukau

History
- Opened: 20 May 1875
- Rebuilt: July 2006

Passengers
- 2011: 3,532 passengers/weekday

Services
Preceding station	Auckland Transport (Auckland One Rail)	Following station
Te Mahia towards Pukekohe	South City Line	Homai towards Newmarket
Location
- 1: First site 1875–1993, 2: Second site 1993–2006, 3: Current site 2006–

Manurewa railway station is a station serving the suburb of Manurewa in Auckland, New Zealand. It is located on the South City line of the Auckland railway network. The station has a side platform layout connected by a pedestrian bridge.

The station has a large park-and-ride facility and interchange with many local bus services. It is located between the SouthMall Shopping Centre and the Manurewa Ministry of Social Development office.

== History ==
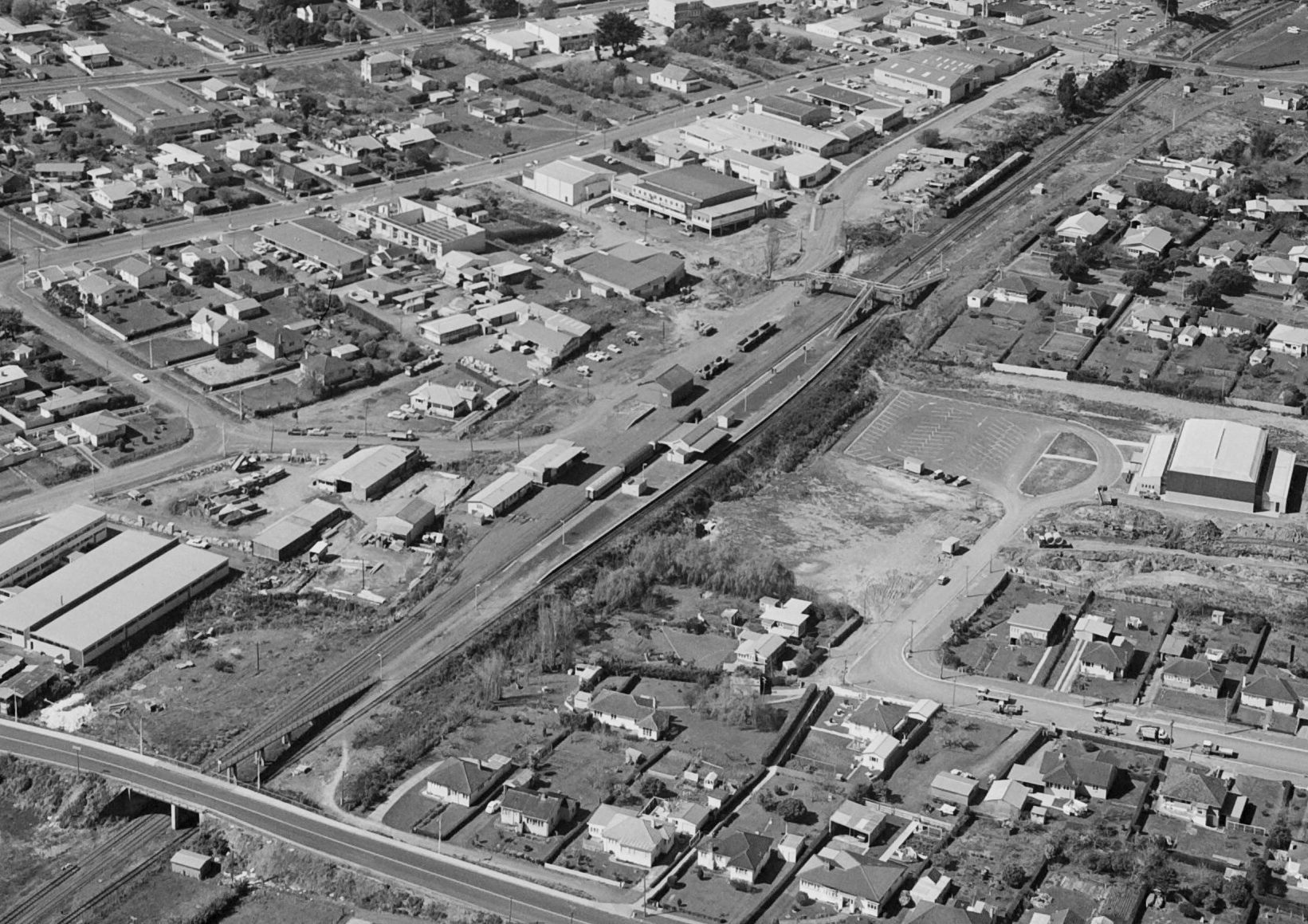
Manurewa railway station, 1971

Manurewa's first station was built as part of the Auckland to Mercer railway. Originally a sixth-class station - little better than a shelter shed, with a watering and coaling place a mile or so beyond. The station led to increased growth and services in Manurewa. In the early days the site was flanked by a stone quarry and a water-driven flour mill. The quarry supplied bluestone blocks for the walls and pillars of St Patrick's cathedral.

It was a flag station until 27 August 1884 when a booking office opened. On 1 September 1884 a post office was established in Manurewa, based in the railway station, but later moved to the Craig family's home on Station Road.

During World War I, the station was moved to the south when the rail was re-aligned. Circa 1921 Jutland Road was established, with a bridge over the railway. A path leading down from the Jutland Road bridge provided access to the northern end of the platform. At the southern end was a pedestrian overbridge, providing access from the railway lane to the north and the end of James Road to the south. Duplication of the tracks between Papatoetoe and Papakura started in 1929 as an employment relief scheme.

On 17 April 1971 the Manurewa Recreation Centre was opened between the station and Russell Road. Land for the centre was acquired from the Railway Department in exchange for 11 sections in the Greenmeadows subdivision. The Manukau City Council later opened a public swimming pool on this site on 13 December 1974. It is now known as the Russell Road Reserve.

In May 1983 the Auckland Regional Authority opened a 'transfer centre' at the station. This included a car park, bus shelter, cycle racks and a 'kiss-and-ride' drop-off point.

=== Second site ===
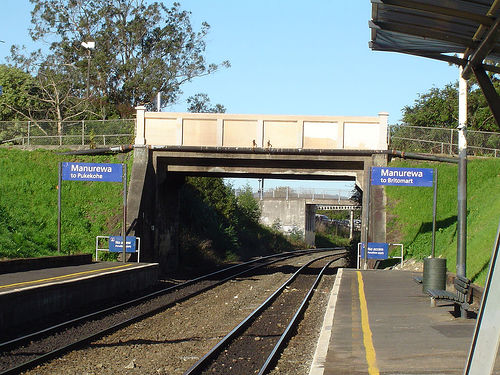
The station in 2005, looking south toward the site of the current station, which is beyond the second bridge.

Second-hand diesel multiple units were purchased for the Auckland rail system from Perth. These new trains required raised platforms to accommodate the lack of external steps. They began running from 5 July 1993.

In July 1993 a new station was opened at a location 800 metres south, nearer to the Southmall shopping centre. This station had a side-platform layout, connected by the adjacent Station Road bridge which had been built in 1922 (NIMT Selwyn Road bridge 347).

On 27 May 2003 the Manurewa Railway Park & Ride was opened next to the station.

Closed when the current station became operational on 20 July 2006, the platforms were removed circa 2011 when the Station Road bridge was rebuilt.

=== Current site ===
The current station was opened on 20 July 2006 on a site even further south, behind the SouthMall Shopping Centre. It has a side platform layout connected by a pedestrian bridge. The Manurewa interchange opened on the same day next to the station, providing interconnection with Auckland's bus network.

By January 2014, wires had been installed as part of the Auckland railway electrification project. Since July 2015, all commuter services have been electric, using AM class electric trains.

Manurewa Railway Park & Ride was renamed to Whakarewa Manu / Manurewa Railway Park & Ride in March 2021 through a programme called Te Kete Rukuruku, which aims to promote te reo Māori usage by the formal adoption of indigenous place names. The name was supplied by Te Ākitai and Ngāti Tamaoho.

== Services ==
Auckland One Rail, on behalf of Auckland Transport, operates South City line services to Newmarket and Pukekohe.

Manurewa is served by bus routes 33, 37, 39, 362, 363, 364, 365 and 366.

== See also ==
- List of Auckland railway stations
- Public transport in Auckland

== Bibliography ==
- Wichman, Gwen (1990), A brief history of Manurewa, Manurewa: Manurewa Historical Society, Wikidata Q117327773
- Wichman, Gwen (2001). Soaring Bird: a History of Manurewa to 1965. Manurewa: Manurewa Historical Society. ISBN 0-473-07114-2. Wikidata Q117421984.
