= Manukau County =

Former county in New Zealand

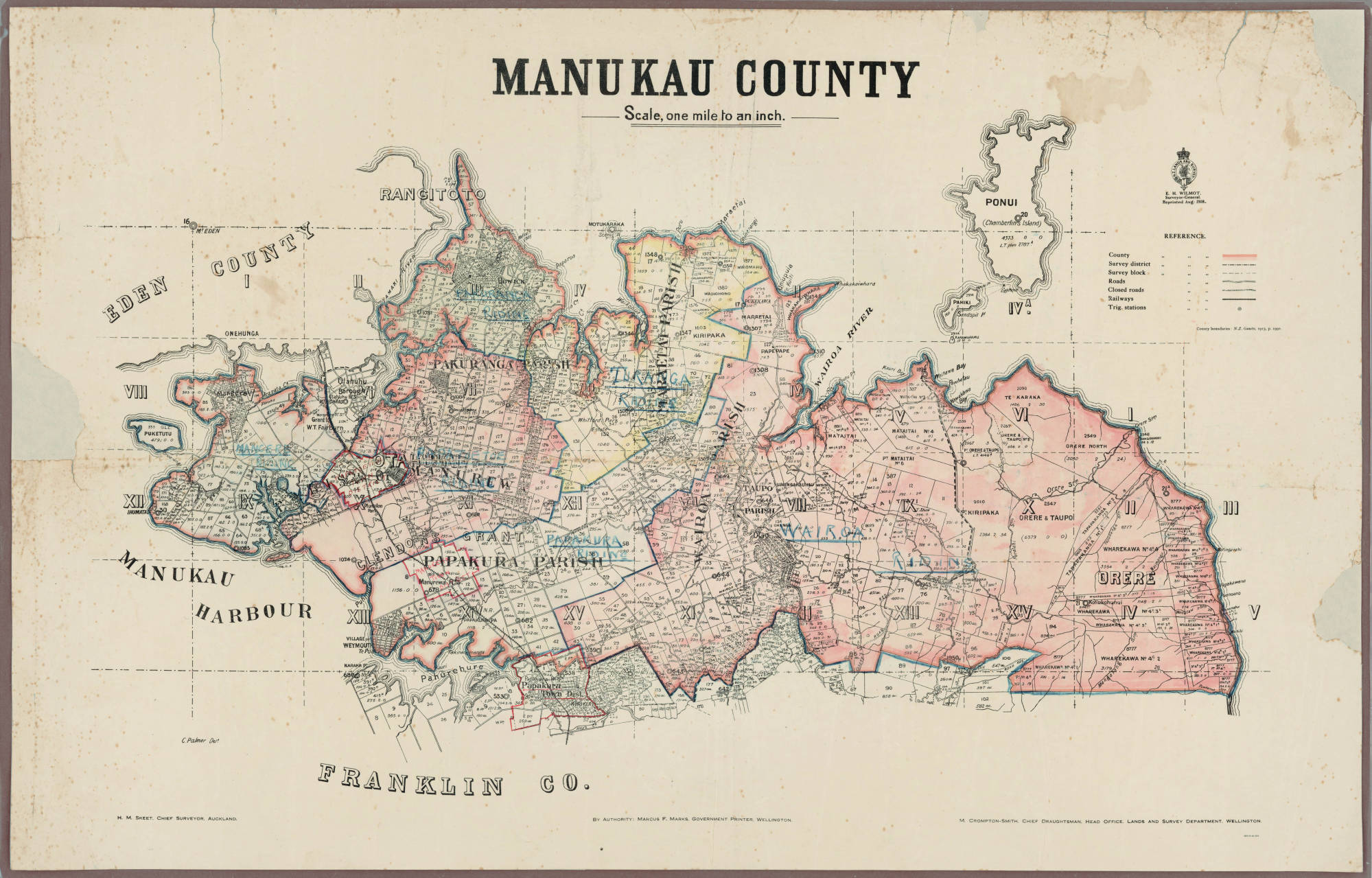
- Manukau County in 1918

Manukau County was a county of New Zealand that was established in 1876 before being re-established with a smaller boundary in 1912 that lasted until 1965, when it was amalgamated with the Borough of Manurewa to form Manukau City.

== History ==
Manukau County was originally formed in 1876; however, it had not implemented the Counties Act by 1877 and the area remained under the governance of road boards until 1 April 1912, when the Franklin and Manukau Counties Act 1911 split off the southern half into Franklin County. Manukau County incorporated 12 of the road districts of the former area and Franklin County incorporated 15 of them. In 1915 the boundaries were redrawn and several thousand acres was transferred from Franklin County to Manukau. By 1921 the county had abolished all the former road districts.

Manukau County established 7 county towns following the Counties Act 1949: Mangere Bridge (1954), Bucklands and Eastern Beaches (1954), Beachlands (1954), Mangere East (1955), Pakuranga (1956), Maraetai (1962), and Otara (1964).

In 1965 the Manukau County merged with the Borough of Manurewa to form Manukau City. The initial proposal for amalgamation included the boroughs of Otahuhu, Papatoetoe, Howick, and Papakura but the aforementioned boroughs opposed amalgamation.
