= Westfield Manukau =

Shopping centre in New Zealand

Coordinates: 36.991396°S 174.881669°E

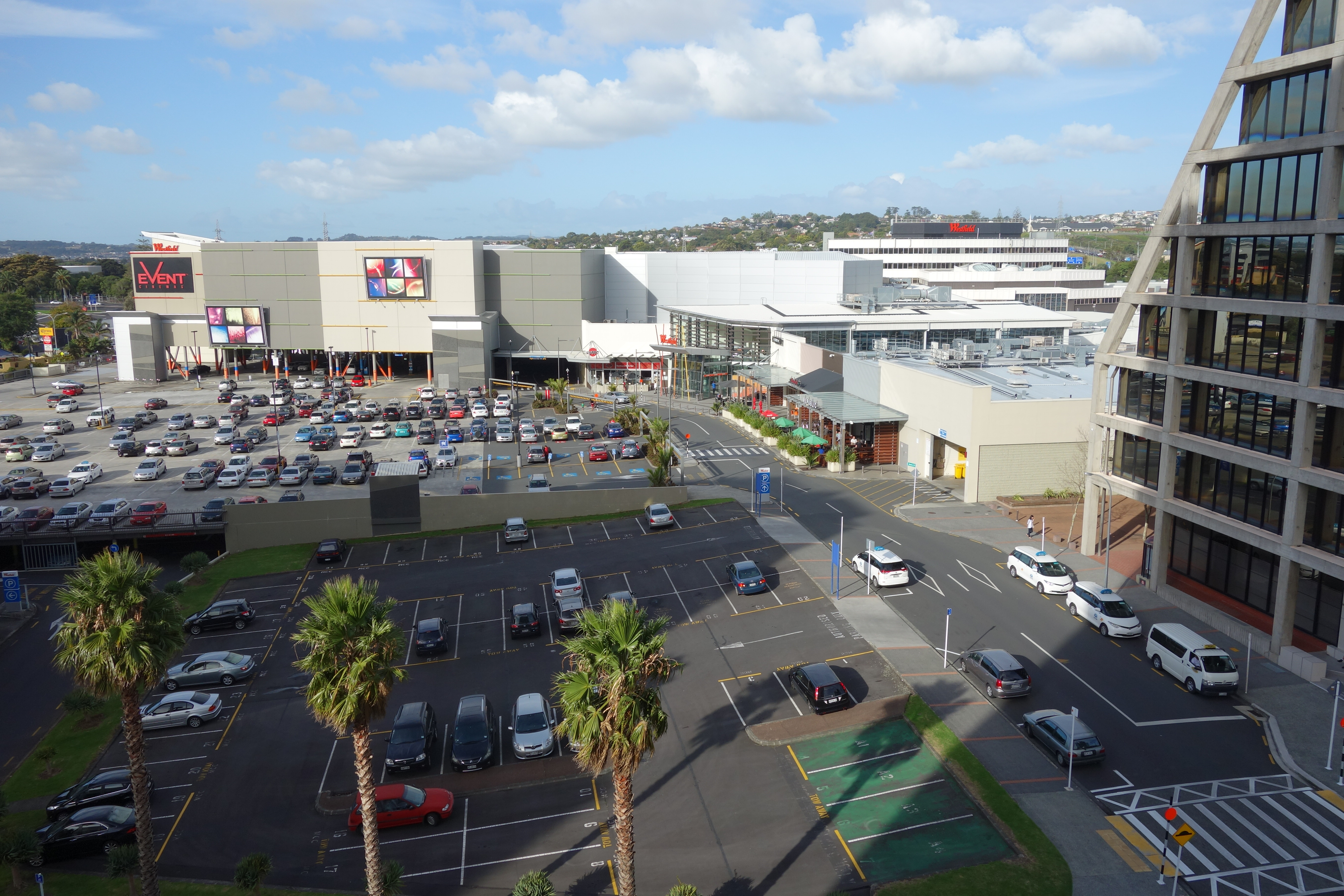
- Amersham Way entrance in 2015
- Location: Manukau, Auckland, New Zealand
- Address: Corner Great South & Manukau Station Roads
- Opened: 20 October 1976; 50 years ago
- Owner: Scentre Group
- Num. of stores: 167
- Num. of anchor tenants: 3 – Farmers, Woolworths and Event Cinemas
- Floor area: 36,793 m^{2} (396,037 sq ft)
- Floors: 2
- Parking: 2,113
- Website: Westfield Manukau

Westfield Manukau is a major shopping centre located in Manukau, a southern district of Auckland, New Zealand. Built in 1972, it was originally named Manukau City Centre.

== History ==
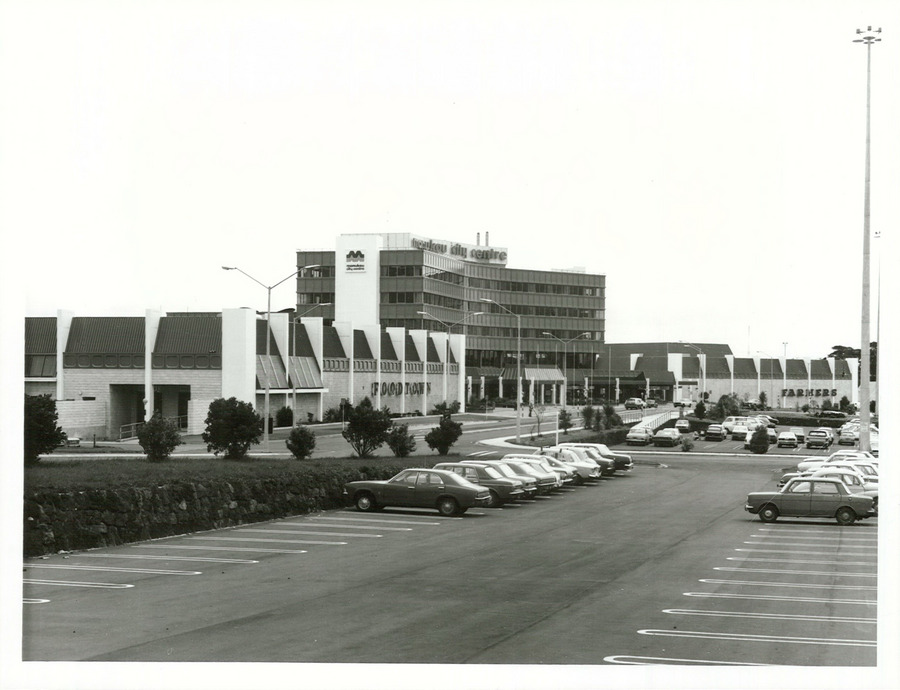
Manukau City Centre mall in 1977

The Manukau City Centre mall was built in 1972 by Fletcher Construction as part of the wider growth and development of Manukau, and opened on 20 October 1976.

On 21 November 1986, Mayor of Manukau City, Barry Curtis, announced plans to establish a mini-monorail system at Manukau City Centre ahead of the 1990 Commonwealth Games, with a later extension to the railway line at Wiri. The plans were later abandoned.

The mall was redeveloped in 1986 and 1992 by then owners National Mutual and Fletcher Challenge. The Westfield Group bought into it in 1998 and took full ownership in 2001, and rebranded it as Westfield Manukau City. It was later rebranded as Westfield Manukau.

In late 2007, after a redevelopment, the mall had more than 170 stores and employed 1,458 staff, and cinemas were due to open in 2008. Annual sales for the year 2018 were $293.4 million.

== See also ==
- List of shopping centres in New Zealand
