= Matukutūreia / McLaughlins Mountain =

Mountain in New Zealand

Matukutūreia
- McLaughlins Mountain
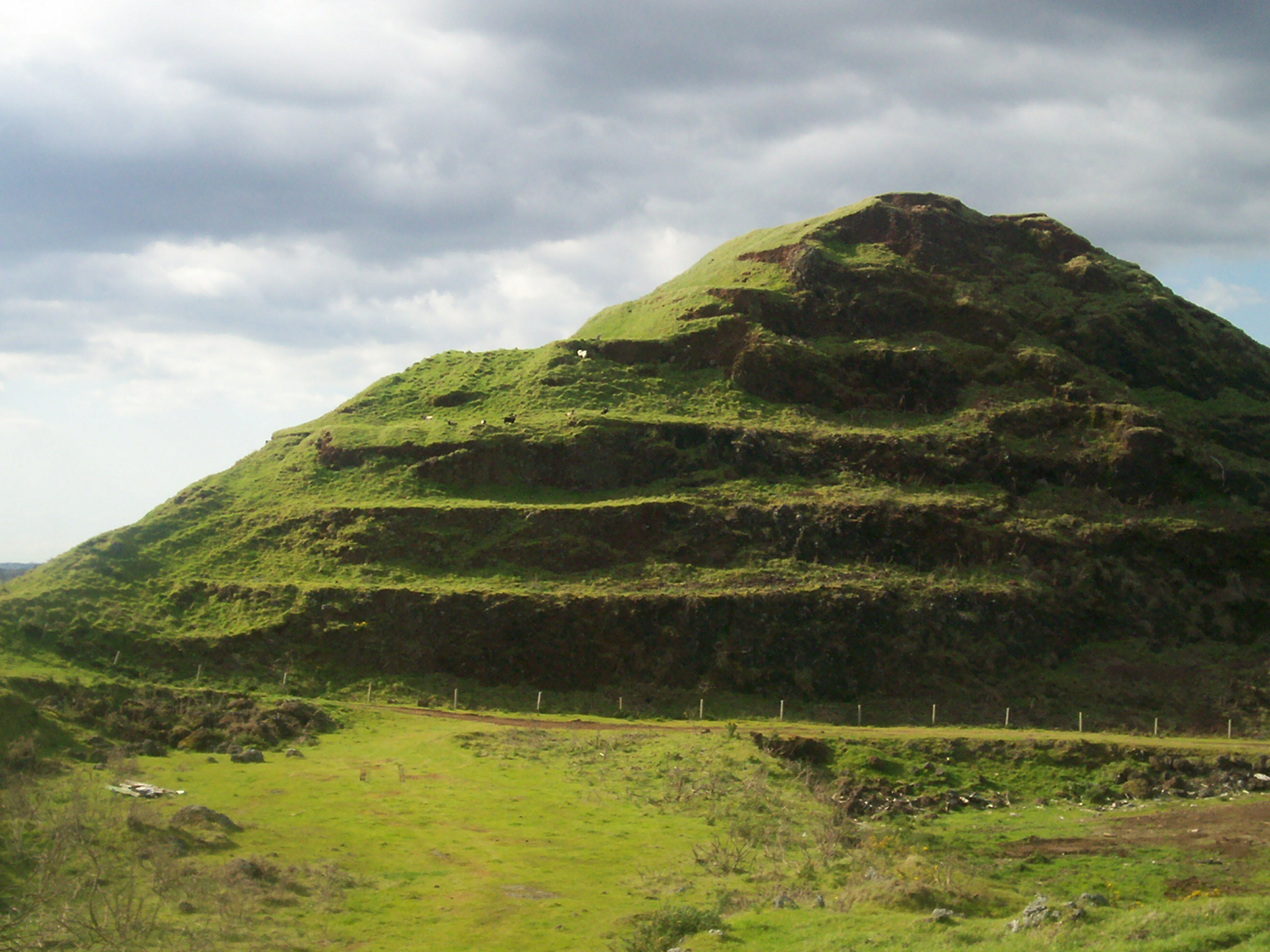
- The quarried remnants of the scoria cone, after removal of the water tank, 2010.

Highest point
- Elevation: 73 m (240 ft)
- Coordinates: 37°00′49″S 174°50′46″E

Geography
- 1: Matukutūruru, 2: Matukutūreia, 3: Ash Hill, 4: Satellite crater, 5: Puhinui Craters
- Location: Wiri, New Zealand

Geology
- Rock age: 50,000 years
- Rock type(s): Scoria, basalt
- Volcanic field: Auckland volcanic field

Matukutūreia / McLaughlin's Mountain is one of the volcanic cones in the Auckland volcanic field. It has a peak 73 metres (240 feet) above sea level, and was the site of a pā.

Created around 50,000 years ago, it had a crescent-shaped scoria cone, before extensive quarrying reduced it to a pyramid-shaped mound. Part of the eastern side of the cone remains intact, along with a large area of lava flows to the south. These remnants now form the Matukurua Stonefields reserve.

Matukutūreia was the site of a terraced pā occupied by Te Waiohua. After European occupation it became a farm, then beginning in the 1960s most of the mountain was quarried away. An industrial subdivision has been built over the former quarry site.

== Etymology ==
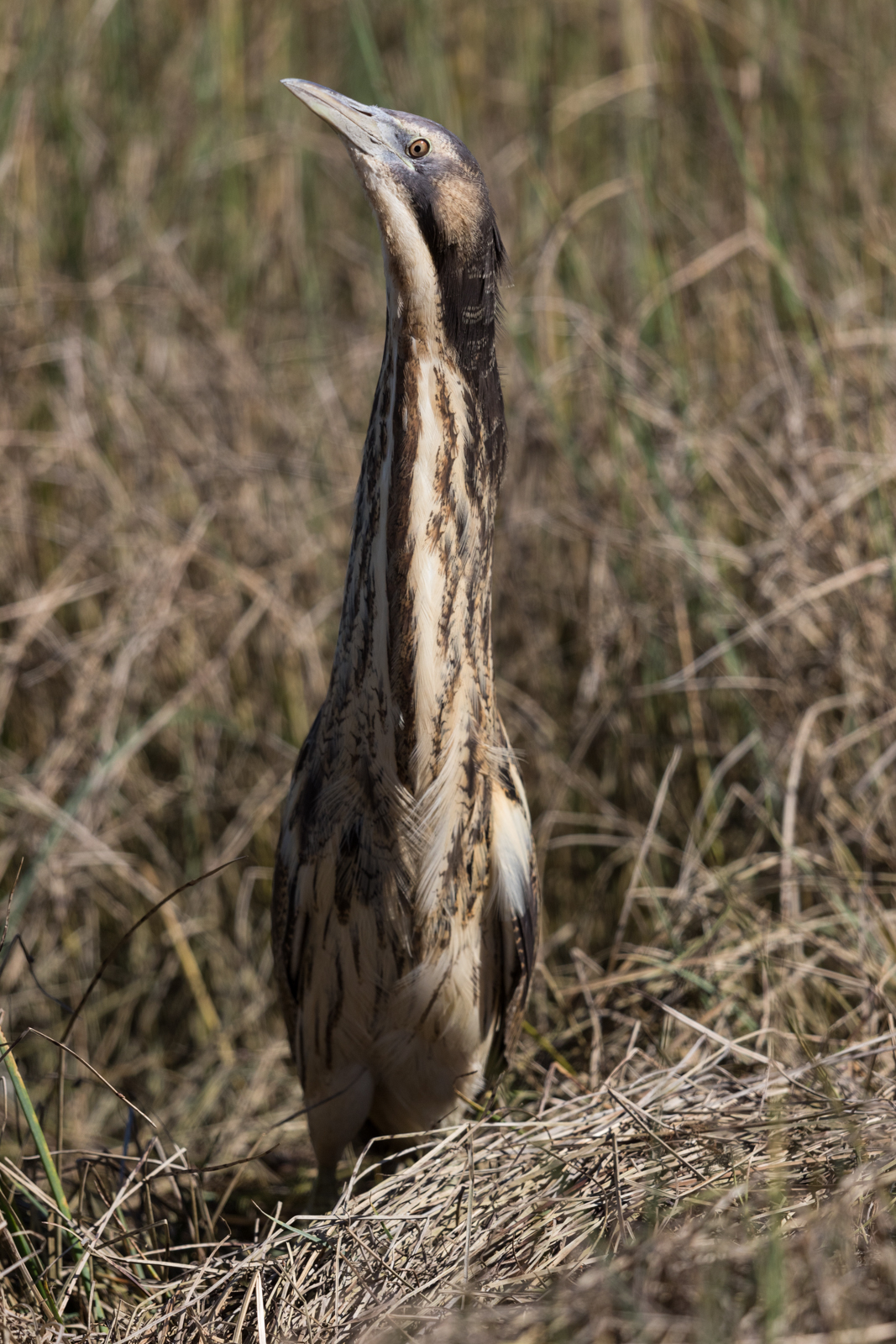
The bittern or Matuku-hūrepo exhibiting its "freeze" or "surveillance" posture. A stocky and sizeable bird, it would have been an apex predator of the wetlands in the area.

Matukutūreia and nearby Matukutūruru are collectively known as Matukurua (also ngā Matukurua) 'The two bitterns'.

The proverb "Ka mae a mata hi tuna, ka ara a mata hi taua." - "He who watches for eels, sleeps; (whereas) he who watches for a war-party keeps awake." is a reference to an event when the two Te Waiohua pā were attacked in the mid 18th century by Te Taoū. Matukutūruru is the 'careless bittern'. Named after the chief who fell asleep at the end of an eel fishing expedition, he was defeated and captured by the enemy. In contrast, Matukutūreia is the 'watchful bittern'. Named after the chief who by his vigilance saved his pā and people.

Some sources have the names switched, with Matukutūreia as the careless bittern.

=== McLaughlin's Mountain ===
The European name, McLaughlin's Mountain, refers to the McLaughlin family. In 1845 Thomas McLaughlin bought the land encompassing Matukutūreia and the southern reaches of the Puhinui Stream. His son, William McLaughlin, later built a homestead on the mountain.

== Geology ==
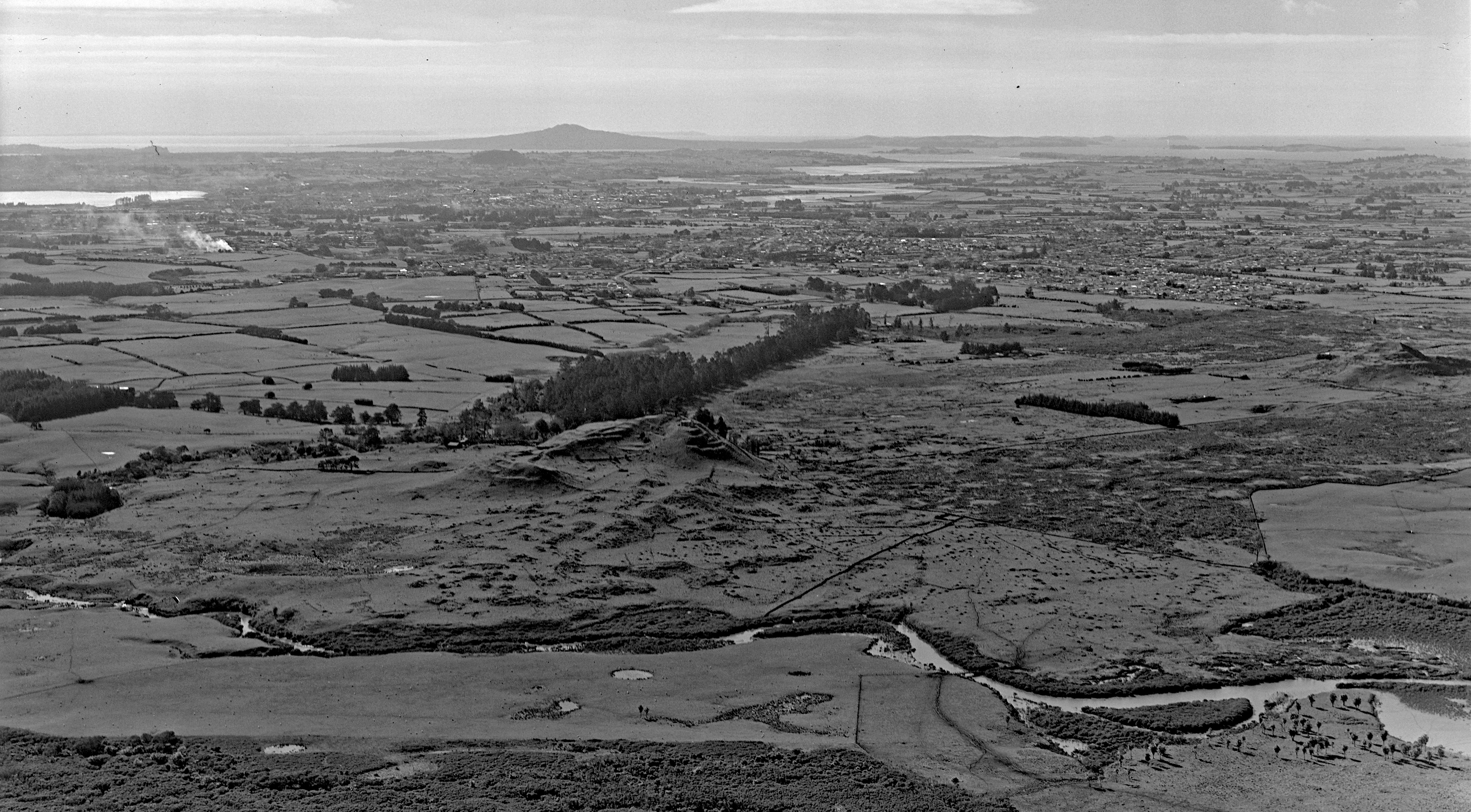
Oblique aerial photograph of the mountain before large-scale quarrying, 1952. The stonefields gardening area is between the mountain and Puhinui Creek in the foreground. Matukutūruru can be seen on the far right. In the background are Papatoetoe and Ōtāhuhu, prehistoric portage routes between the Manukau Harbour on the left and Hauraki Gulf on the right. The silhouette of Rangitoto dominates the horizon.

Matukutūruru was created in a sequence of eruptions around 50,000 years ago. Samples of the lava flows have been dated at 48,000 ± 3000 years using argon–argon radiometric dating.

Fountaining eruptions created a large spatter cone. Lava flows from the southern side carried away some of the cone, making it crescent-shaped. Rafted scoria gave this side a rough, irregular surface. The last eruptions produced partly welded basalt which capped the cone.

=== Satellite crater ===
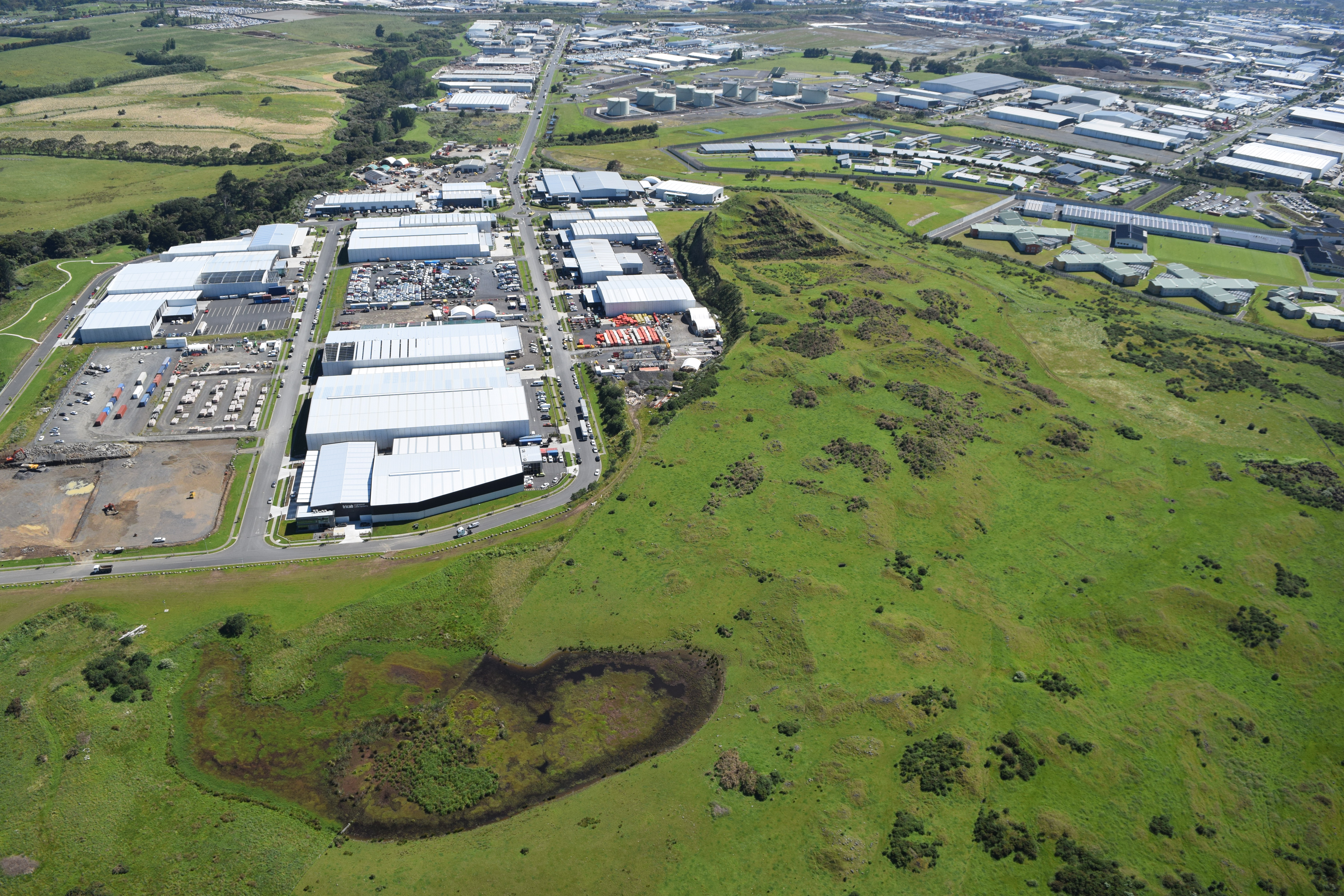
2018 oblique aerial photograph, from roughly the same direction as the 1952 photo. Now the site of an industrial subdivision, and the Matukurua Stonefields reserve. The swamp in the foreground was created by large steam explosions. The pyramid-shaped remnants of the scoria cone are in the background.

Late in the sequence large steam explosions created a crater to the southwest. Some of the last lava flows partly filled this crater, giving it an irregular shape. After filling with sediment this is now a seasonally flooded swamp.

=== Nearby volcanoes ===
Matukutūreia is part of a line of three volcanoes in the Auckland volcanic field.

Matukutūruru lies to the northeast, created in a series of eruptions around 20,000 years after Matukutūreia. It had a scoria cone reaching approximately 60 metres (200 feet) higher than the surrounding land. The lava flows covered around 18 hectares and reached the base of Matukutūreia's scoria cone.

Ash Hill is 900 meters (3,000 feet) to the northeast of Matukutūruru. It seems to have erupted slightly earlier than Matukutūruru and is recognised as a separate volcano. A low tuff cone with an explosion crater about 150 metres (490 feet) wide, it peaked at approximately 8 metres (26 feet) higher than the surrounding land. In recent years it was flattened and is now covered by industrial development.

=== Puhinui Craters ===
Next to Matukutūreia, but not on the same line, are the three Puhinui Craters. They are a cluster of three small maar craters all of roughly 200 m (660 ft) diameter. They were first recognised as volcanic craters in 2011.

Their ages are unknown but most likely all erupted at the same time. They could be associated with the Matukutūreia eruption but this is not known to be the case.

== Archaeology ==
In contrast to the area around Matukutūruru, which was extensively built over and quarried, a large part of the area surrounding Matukutūreia remains relatively intact.

The archaeological remains include pits, stone alignments and other stone features, cooking and food preparation areas represented by fire-cracked rock and midden, and obsidian flakes. Radiocarbon dates suggest intense occupation of the garden areas for at least 100 years during the 16th and 17th centuries. Kumara and taro were grown in the garden areas, with nīkau probably planted and managed as another food resource.

Shell midden was dominated by cockle, along with other easily accessible species. Fish weirs and other midden sites have been found along the Puhinui Stream.

== History ==
=== Māori occupation ===
In pre-European Māori times, the Auckland Volcanic Field became one of the most densely populated areas of New Zealand. The volcanic cone of Matukutūreia was terraced and built upon, becoming a pā — a formidable defensive structure. The fertile volcanic soils surrounding the cone were easy to cultivate with wooden tools and were extensively used to grow food such as kūmara and taro. Stone walls were built dividing garden plots, but unlike many other volcanic cone pā there is no discernible pattern radiating out from the cone. The Manukau Harbour and Puhinui Creek provided food, fresh water, and transport.

Evidence of Māori occupation of the area dates back to the 13th century.

Te Waiohua occupied the area until around 1740 when Te Taoū waged war on Te Waiohua and killed their chief Kiwi Tāmaki, defeating them. They fled to the Waikato. In the 1780s the descendants of Kiwi Tāmaki, Te Ākitai Waiohua, returned and re-established the settlement at Wiri.

The introduction of the musket created a period of great instability in the region. By 1821, with the threat of Ngāpuhi war parties from northland armed with muskets, all volcanic cone pā of Tāmaki Makaurau were virtually abandoned as defensive fortresses. When the first European missionaries passed through the area in 1834 they reported little evidence of occupation by māori.

=== European occupation ===
Extent of the Fairburn Purchase and Clendon's Grant. Granted to James Reddy Clendon Extent of the "Fairburn purchase"

In the 1830s William Fairburn, a missionary with the Church Missionary Society, claimed to have purchased most of South Auckland (83,000 acres, stretching from Papatoetoe to Papakura) from Māori. After the treaty signing in 1840, the purchase was examined by the newly formed Colony of New Zealand. Fairburn was allowed to keep a seventh of the land, with the Crown keeping the "surplus lands".

Matukutūreia was part of a 10,000 acres (4,000 hectares) block granted by the Government to the trader James Reddy Clendon in 1840 — known as the Clendon Grant.

=== McLaughlin family ===
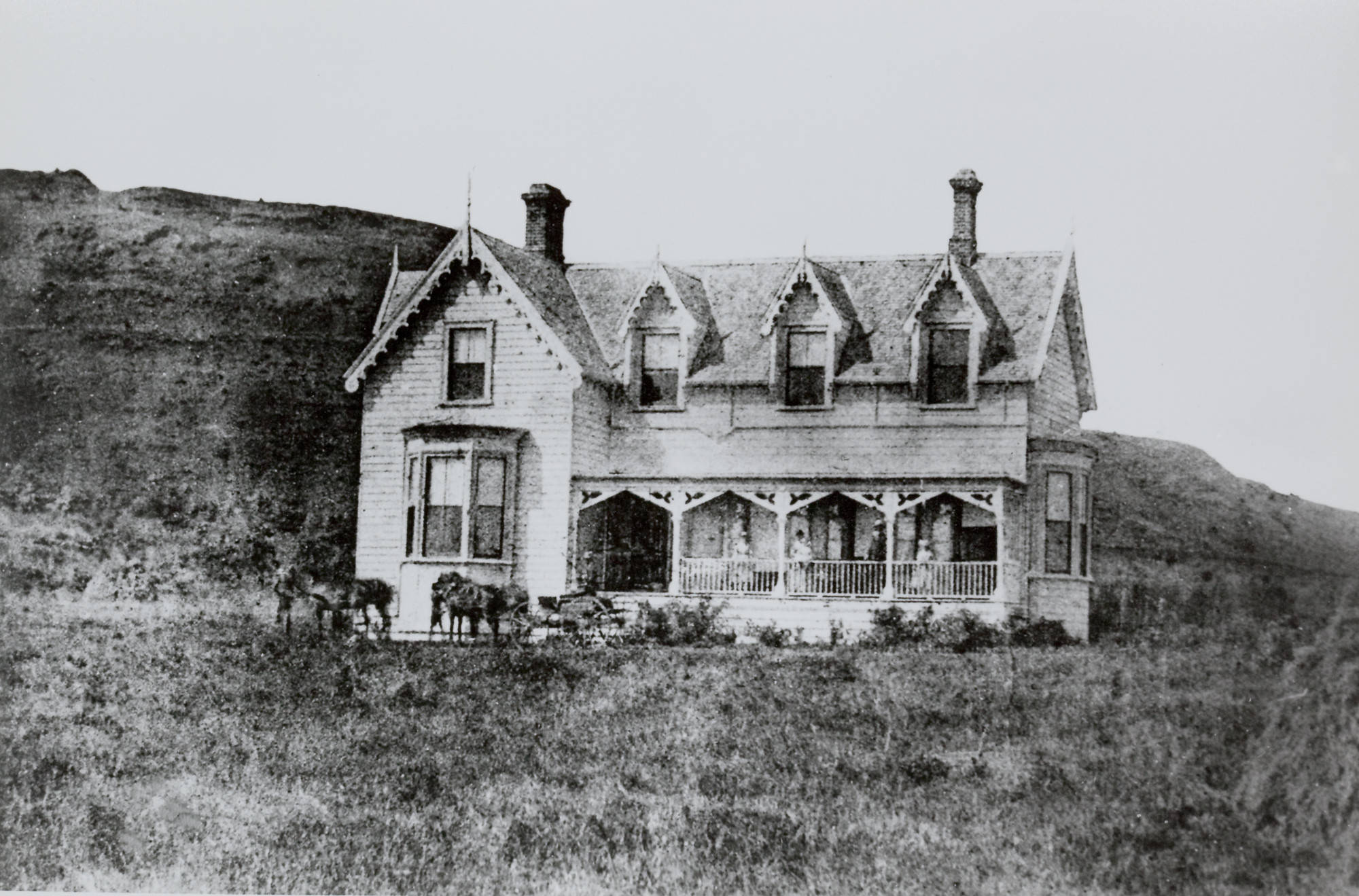
Circa 1865 photo of William McLaughlin's homestead 'Puhi Nui' on the north-eastern side of the mountain.

In 1845 Thomas McLaughlin, a wealthy merchant from Peru, bought 2,786 acres (1,127 hectares) of land in the northern part of the Clendon Grant, including Matukutūreia and the southern reaches of the Puhinui Stream.

In the 1850s a small quarry was established to supply metal for the construction of Great South Road.

Thomas's son, William McLaughlin, later built a fine two-storey Gothic Revival homestead on the north-eastern flank of the mountain. The homestead was known as 'Puhi Nui' (sometimes 'Puhinui'), a name also applied to the McLaughlin estate. The exact date of its construction has not been recorded, but the use of bricks from Drury in one of the chimneys suggest that it was circa 1864. According to some accounts, it replaced a single-storey house built on the original site before 1861.

From 1965, the family rented out the homestead, then in 1980 donated it to the Howick and Districts Historical Society. The building was relocated to Howick Historical Village on 12 February 1982, where it has since been restored. On 16 May 2004 it was opened to the public.

=== Water tank ===
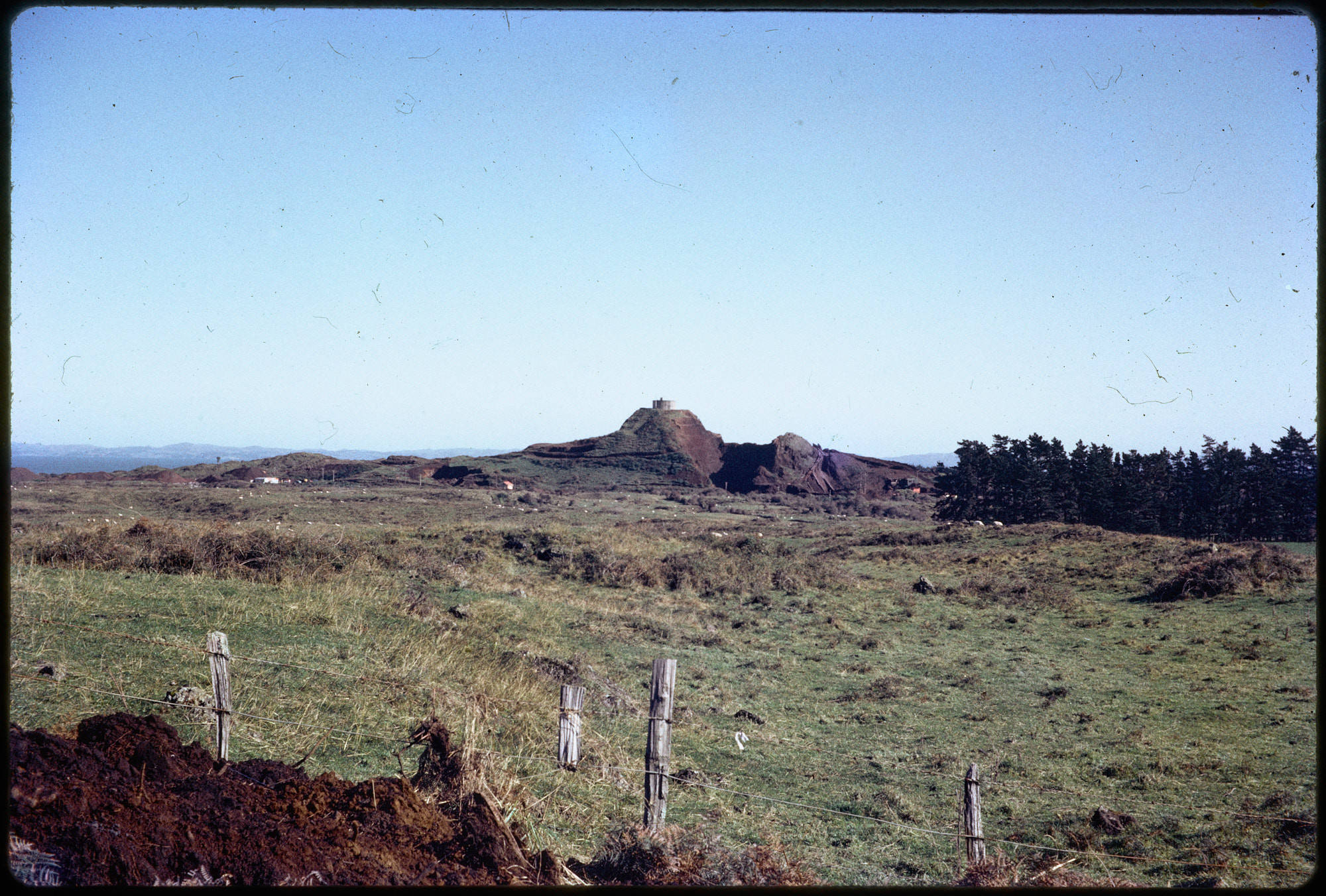
View across the fields from Roscommon Road, 1965. The effects of quarrying on the flanks of the mountain can clearly be seen, as can the water reservoir on its flattened peak.

In 1929 a water tank was built on the scoria cone. A brick pumphouse supplied it with water from a bore at the base. It was used to supply water to Papatoetoe Borough until the 1960s.

In 2011 the water tank and pumphouse were removed, as part of the creation of the Matukurua Stonefields reserve.

=== McLaughlin's Quarry ===
Large scale quarrying began in the 1960s. The cone was almost entirely removed, except for a small pyramid-shaped section under the water tank. After the scoria of the cone ran out quarrying activities moved on to the lava flows. Part of the neighbouring stonefields to the south were excluded from quarrying activities.

In the 1987 share market crash, Downer Mining went bust, resulting in sale of the quarry to Fletcher Building.

By 2009, all quarrying activities had ceased. In 2016 the site of the former quarry became Wiri Precinct, enabling redevelopment for heavy industrial activities.

=== Matukurua Stonefields reserve ===
In 2008 the 43-hectare Matukurua Stonefields historic reserve was created to protect the remnants of the cone and adjacent stonefields garden area.

The reserve is the result of an exchange between the government and Winstone Aggregates, a division of Fletcher Building. The government exchanged two former quarries (Wiri North and South, which were once the lava flows and scoria cone of Matukutūruru) for the remnants of the volcanic cone and remaining intact stonefields gardens of Matukutūreia.
