= Te Waiohua =

Māori iwi (tribe) in New Zealand

- Iwi (tribe) in Māoridom
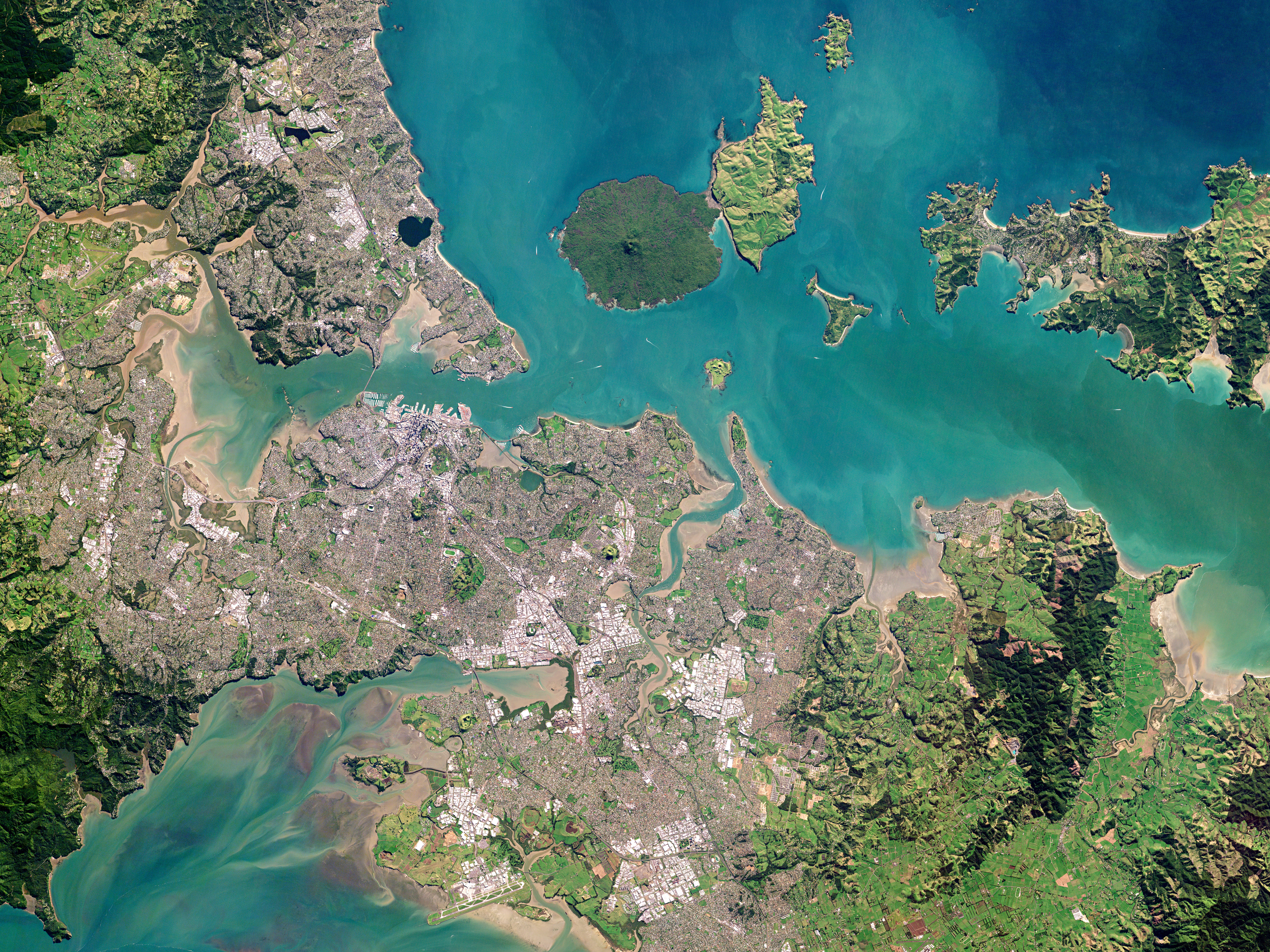
- Tāmaki Makaurau region
- Waka (canoe): Te Wakatūwhenua and Te Moekākara

Te Waiohua or Te Wai-o-Hua is a Māori iwi (tribe) confederation that thrived in the early 17th century. The rohe (tribal area) was primarily the central Tāmaki Makaurau area (the Auckland isthmus) and they had pā (fortified settlements) at Te Tātua a Riukiuta (Three Kings), Puketāpapa (Mt Roskill), Te Ahi-kā-a-Rakataura (Mt Albert), Maungakiekie (One Tree Hill), Maungawhau (Mt Eden), Tītīkōpuke (Mt St John), Ōhinerau (Mt Hobson), Rangitotoiti (Upland Reserve), Taurarua (Judges Bay), Rarotonga (Mt Smart), Ōtāhuhu, Te Pane o Mataaoho (Māngere Mountain), Ihumātao, Matukutūreia (McLaughlin's Mountain) and Matukutūruru (Wiri Mountain), until the 1740s, when the paramount Waiohua chief, Kiwi Tāmaki, was defeated by the Ngāti Whātua hapū, Te Taoū. The descendants of the Waiohua confederation today include Ngāti Te Ata Waiohua, Ngāti Tamaoho and Te Ākitai Waiohua.

== History ==
Waiohua was a confederation of tribes of the Tāmaki Makaurau region, who were united as a single unit by Huakaiwaka (from which the name of the tribe, The Waters of Hua, can be traced). Huakaiwaka lived and died at Maungawhau / Mount Eden. The three main groups who Huakaiwaka merged were known as Ngā Oho, based in Papakura, Ngā Riki, based in South Auckland with a rohe spanning from Papakura to Ōtāhuhu, and Ngā Iwi, who settled from Ōtāhuhu to the North Shore. The confederation took the name Waiohua after the death of Te Hua-o-Kaiwaka, sometime between 1575 and the 1620s. Ngā Oho, Ngā Riki and Ngā Iwi continued to have distinct identities while being a part of Waiohua as a whole.

Around the year 1675, Ngāti Maru of the Marutūāhu collective sacked the Waiohua pā located at Maungakiekie / One Tree Hill, Maungawhau and Maungarei / Mount Wellington. Around 1680, Ngāti Whātua warrior chief Kāwharu led war parties to attack and sack two Waiohua pā located at Matukutūreia (McLaughlins Mountain) and Matukutūruru (Wiri Mountain), in the western part of Wiri, South Auckland.

Te Ikamaupoho, son of Te Huakaiwaka, begun to lead Te Waiohua in the late 17th century, and by early 1700s the confederation was the main influential force on the Auckland isthmus. The pā at Maungakiekie / One Tree Hill had become the tribal centre for Waiohua. It was the residence of most high chiefs in the confederation, and the location where many traditional rituals were undertaken. By the 1720s, the major settlements of Waiohua included Maungawhau, Maungakiekie, Māngere Mountain ("Te Pane o Mataoho"), Ōtāhuhu, Puketāpapa, Te Tātua a Riukiuta, Te Ahi-kā-a-Rakataura, Titikōpuke, Ōhinerau and Maungataketake near Ihumātao. By this period, Ngāi Tāhuhu and Te Kawerau ā Maki were considered allies to Waiohua, or hapū who were a part of the union.

Around the 1730s and 1740s, Waiohua fought battles against Ngāti Pāoa to the south (based in the western Hauraki Plains Ngāti Pāoa) and Te Taoū of Ngāti Whātua (then located around the Kaipara Harbour). Te Taoū sacked Waiohua settlements such as Maungakiekie and Māngere. Around 1741, the paramount chief of Te Waiohua, Kiwi Tāmaki, was killed in battle at Paruroa (Great Muddy Creek in Titirangi) by Te Taoū/Ngāti Whātua chief Te Waha-akiaki, in response to Kiwi Tāmaki killing several members of Te Taoū treacherously. Ngāti Whātua became the major influential force on the Auckland isthmus from then until the early 1800s. In the 1750s, many remaining members of Waiohua settled among Waikato Tainui to the south, in locations such as Drury, Pōkeno and Papakura, while others intermarried with Ngāti Whātua.

In around 1765, the Waikato-based refugees of Waiohua returned to Manukau, and are now known as Ngāti Te Ata Waiohua and Te Ākitai Waiohua. Members of Waiohua (Ngāti Te Ata) who intermarried with Te Taoū re-adopted the name Ngā Oho, and today are a hapū of Ngāti Whātua Ōrākei. Te Ākitai Waiohua began to resettle the southern rohe of Waiohua up to Ōtāhuhu. By the 1790s, Ngāti Whātua and Waiohua allied forces against Ngāti Pāoa who were settling along the Tāmaki River. In the 1820s during the Musket Wars, Ngāti Whatua, Ngāti Te Ata Waiohua and Te Ākitai Waiohua relocated to the Waikato under the protection of Pōtatau Te Wherowhero, returning in 1835. During the 1840s, Waiohua descendant tribes returned to their papakāinga (settlements) at Ihumātao, Pūkaki, Papahinu and Waimahia, while Ngāti Whātua Ōrākei moved their main settlement from Māngere/Onehunga to Ōrākei on the Waitematā Harbour.

In 1863 due to fears of the Māori King Movement and invasion, Governor George Grey ordered the eviction of all Māori in the Manukau harbour and South Auckland area who did not swear an oath to the Queen and give up arms. Many Waiohua-descendant tribes felt that there was no choice but to leave for the Waikato, due to their shared ties with the Waikato Tainui tribes. While leaving for the Waikato, Te Ākitai Waiohua rangatira Ihaka Takaanini was arrested alongside his family by his former neighbour Marmaduke Nixon, and accused of being a rebel. While taken hostage at Rakino Island, Ihaka Takaanini died. Days after the announcement, the Crown began the Invasion of the Waikato. After the invasion, much of the Waiohua tribes' land was confiscated, subdivided and sold to British immigrants.

== Descendant iwi and hapū and marae ==
Many iwi and hapū trace their lineage back to Waiohua, including:

- Ngā Oho (Ngāti Whātua Ōrākei)
- Ngāti Tamaoho
- Ngāti Te Ata Waiohua
- Te Ahiwaru Waiohua
- Te Ākitai Waiohua
- Te Uringutu

== Bibliography ==
- Mackintosh, Lucy (2021). Shifting Grounds: Deep Histories of Tāmaki Makaurau Auckland. Bridget Williams Books. doi:10.7810/9781988587332. ISBN 978-1-988587-33-2.
