= Te Ākitai Waiohua =

Iwi in New Zealand

- Iwi (tribe) in Māoridom
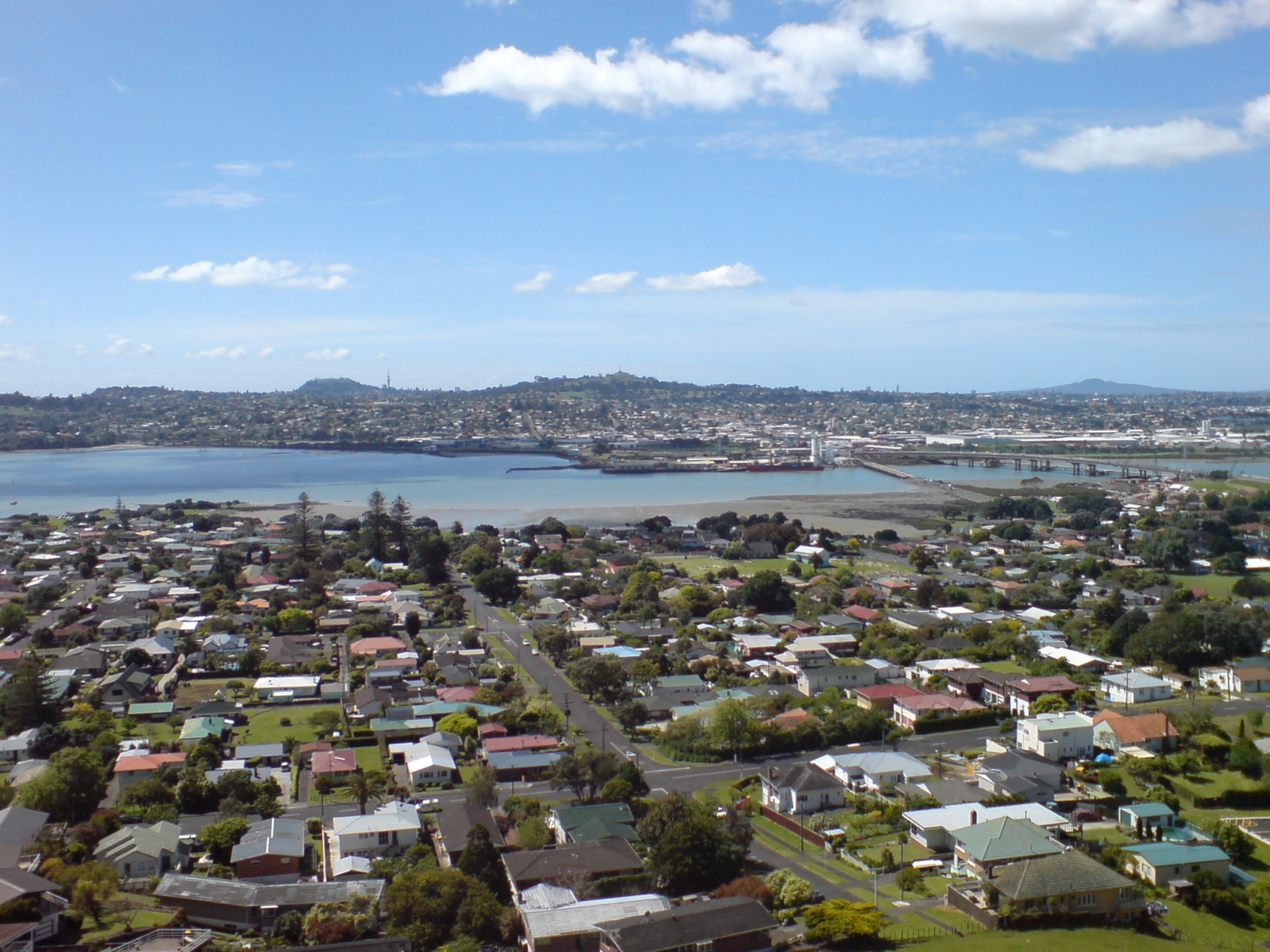
- Māngere Bridge suburb

Te Ākitai Waiohua is a Māori iwi of the southern part of the Auckland Region of New Zealand.

== History ==
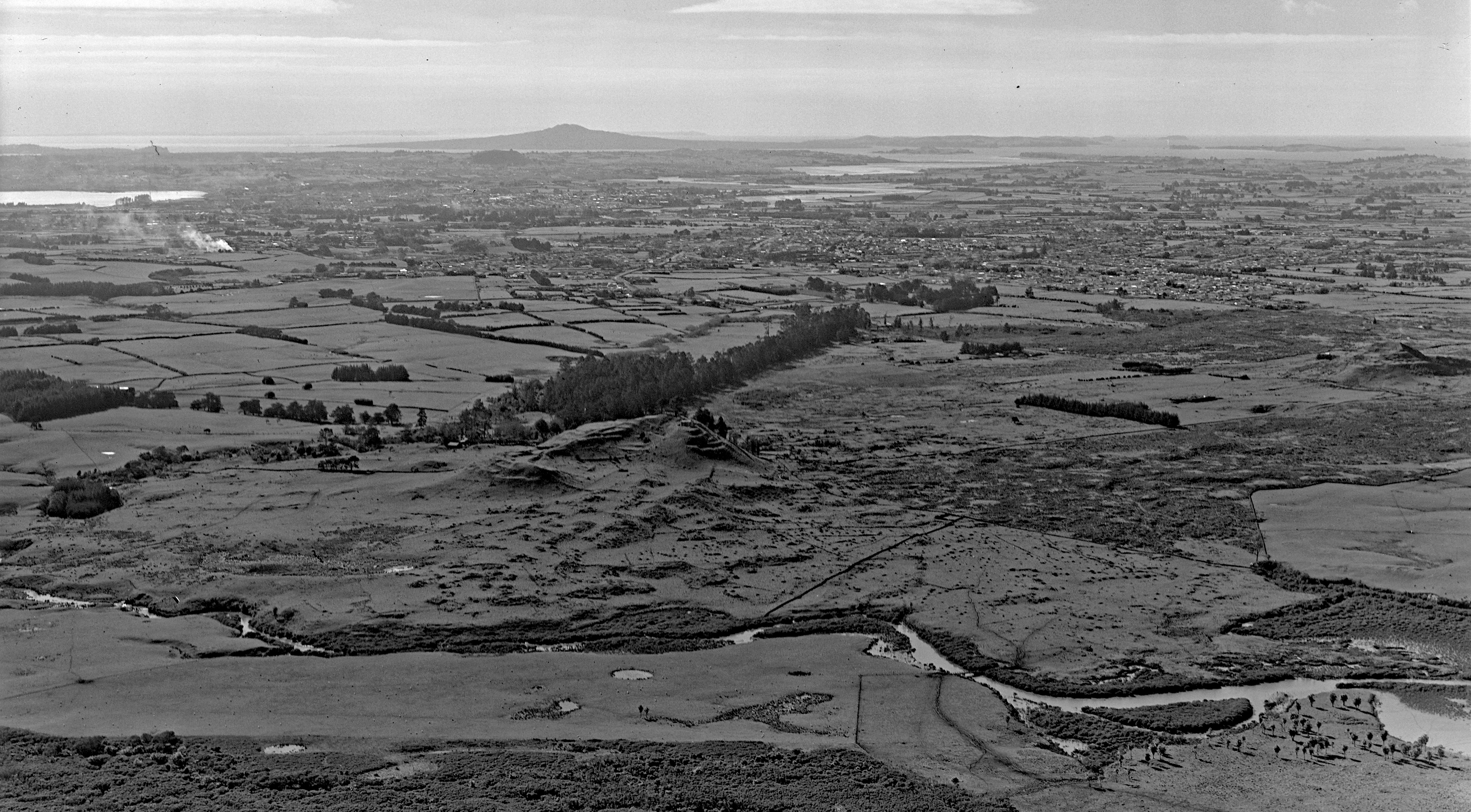
Oblique aerial photograph of Matukutūreia before large-scale quarrying, 1952. Puhinui Creek is in the foreground. Matukutūruru can be seen on the far right. In the background Papatoetoe and Ōtāhuhu lie on prehistoric portage routes between the Manukau Harbour on the left and Hauraki Gulf on the right. The silhouette of Rangitoto dominates the horizon.

Te Ākitai Waiohua are descended from Kiwi Tāmaki, the grandson of Huakaiwaka, himself the ancestor of the te Waiohua iwi, who lived in Tāmaki (the Auckland isthmus). The name Te Ākitai commemorates Kiwi Tāmaki's uncle Huatau, who, in the early 18th century, died at sea in the Manukau Harbour and whose body was dashed up (āki) by the sea (tai) on Puketutu Island.

Kiwi Tāmaki was killed in battle with Te Taoū hapū (sub-tribe) of Ngāti Whātua in the mid-18th century. Ngāti Whātua settled in Tāmaki and the Waiohua retreated to Drury, Pōkeno, Kirikiri/Papakura, Ramarama and other parts of South Auckland. In the 1780s Te Ākitai Waiohua re-established settlements at Wiri, Pūkaki and Ōtāhuhu. Kiwi Tāmaki had a surviving son named Rangimatoru, who lived in South Auckland with Ngā Oho, a hapū of Ngāti Whātua Ōrākei formed by intermarriages between Ngāti Whātua and Waiohua people. He died circa 1793, fighting alongside Ngāti Whatua in a war with Hauraki Gulf-based iwi Ngāti Pāoa, and was succeeded by his son, Pepene te Tihi.

In the 1820s, Ngāpuhi of Northland acquired muskets and attacked Tāmaki, leading the local tribes to retreat to the Waikato. In 1835 the tribes returned and Te Ākitai Waiohua resettled at Pūkaki, Papakura, Pukekiwiriki (near Papakura) and Pōkeno.

Te Ākitai Waiohua became supporters of the Māori King movement when it arose in the 1850s. By 1861, the chiefs of Te Ākitai Waiohua were Pepene Te Tihi, grandson of Kiwi Tāmaki, and his son Ihaka Wirihana Takaanini. They lived at Pūkaki, Māngere and Ramarama. Before the invasion of the Waikato by the colonial government, Ihaka Takaanini was accused of being a rebel. Tribal land at Māngere was confiscated, and Pepene Te Tihi, Ihaka, his wife and three children were arrested. Pepene, Ihaka and two of the children died in custody in 1863–1864. The surviving child, Te Wirihana Takaanini, became the chief of Te Ākitai Waiohua.

== Marae ==
The iwi's principal marae is Pūkaki Marae, which is in a rural area just south of the suburb of Māngere on the Waokauri Creek, an inlet of the Manukau Harbour. They are also associated with Makaurau marae at Ihumātao, just south-west of Māngere.

== Notable people ==
- Kiwi Tāmaki
- Kahupāke Rongonui

== See also ==
- List of iwi
