= Matukutūruru =

Scoria hill in Auckland, New Zealand

- Wiri Mountain
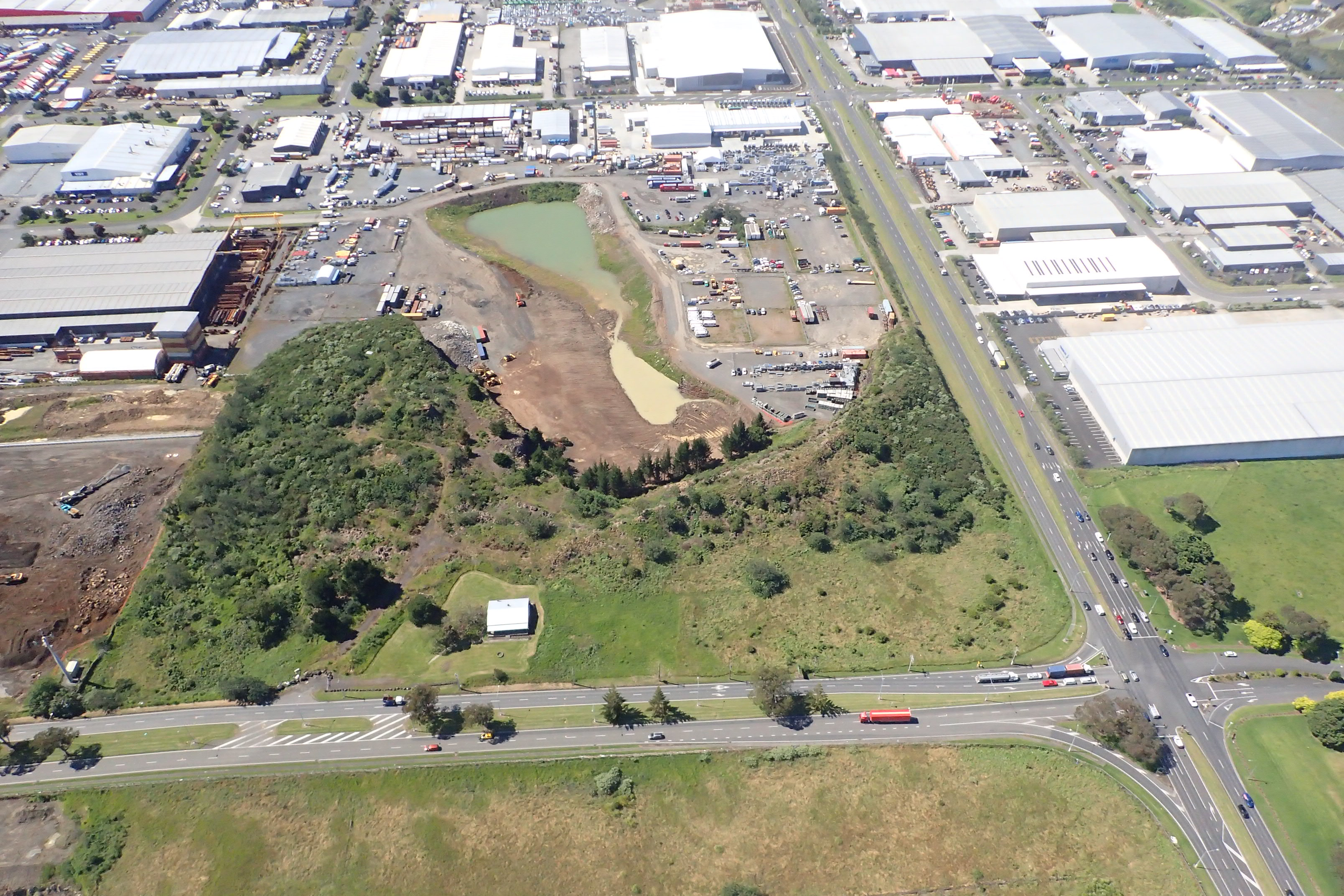
- The remnants of Matukutūruru, 2018

Highest point
- Elevation: 90 m (300 ft)
- Prominence: 60 m (200 ft)
- Coordinates: 37°00′26″S 174°51′30″E

Naming
- Pronunciation: /matʉkʉtʉːɾʉɾʉ/
- Defining authority: New Zealand Geographic Board

Geography
- 1: Matukutūruru, 2: Matukutūreia, 3: Ash Hill, 4: Satellite crater, 5: Puhinui Craters
- Location: Wiri, Auckland, New Zealand

Geology
- Rock age: 30,500 years
- Rock type(s): Scoria, basalt
- Volcanic field: Auckland volcanic field

Matukutūruru (also Te Manurewa o Tamapahore or Wiri Mountain) is a volcano in Wiri, Auckland. Part of the Auckland volcanic field; it is one of the Tūpuna Maunga o Tāmaki Makaurau (ancestral mountains of Auckland).

Created by a series of eruptions 30,500 years ago, it had a scoria cone reaching approximately 60 metres higher than the surrounding land. The lava flows covered around 18 hectares and created the 290 metre long Wiri Lava Cave.

Matukutūruru was the site of a terraced pā occupied by Te Waiohua. After European occupation the scoria cone was almost completely quarried away, with the removed material used for construction.

== Etymology ==
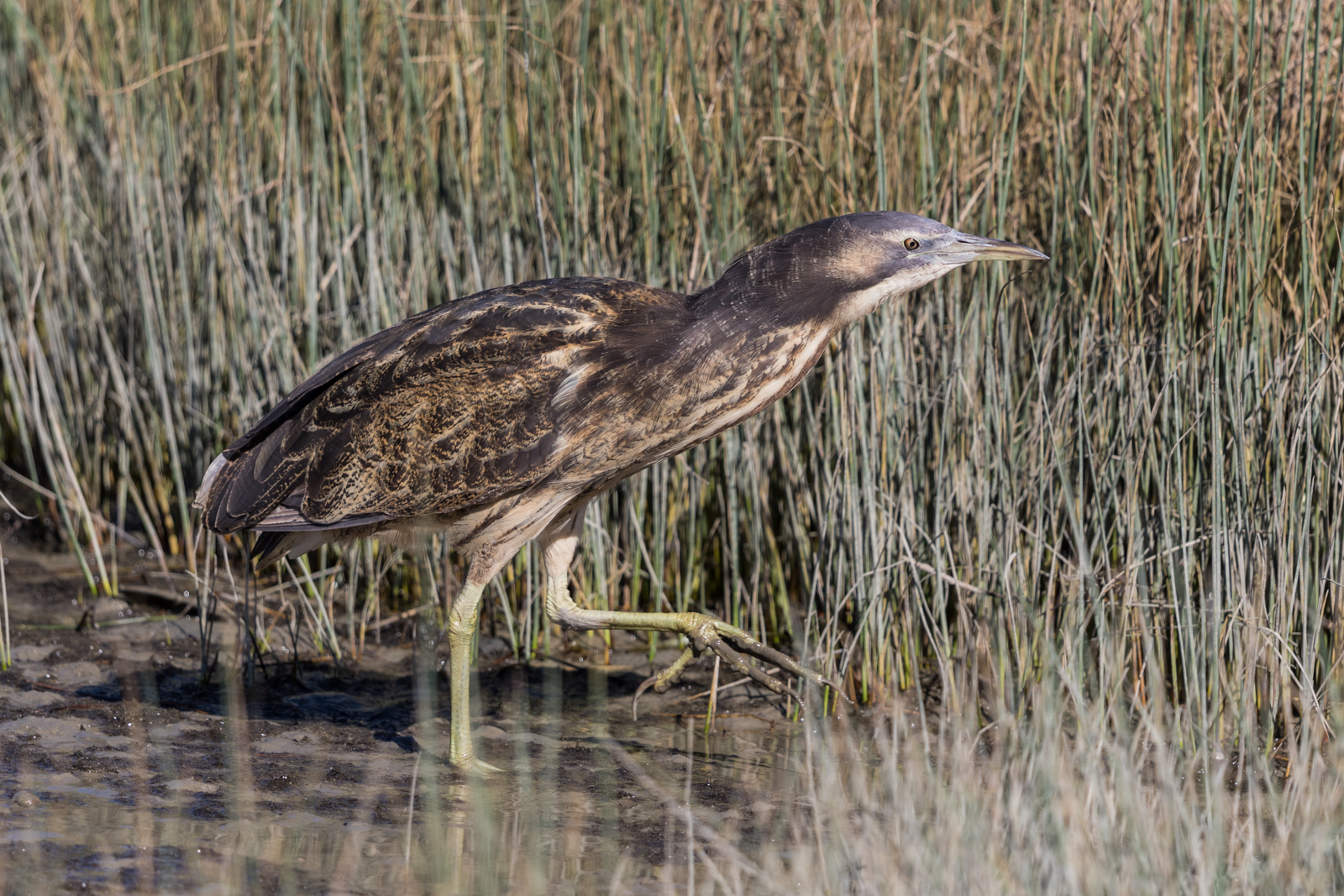
The bittern or Matuku-hūrepo is a stocky and sizeable bird which would have been an apex predator of the wetlands in the area.

Matukutūruru and nearby Matukutūreia are collectively known as Matukurua (also ngā Matukurua) 'The two bitterns'.

The proverb "Ka mae a mata hi tuna, ka ara a mata hi taua." - "He who watches for eels, sleeps; (whereas) he who watches for a war-party keeps awake." is a reference to an event when the two Te Waiohua pā were attacked in the mid 18th century by Te Taoū. Matukutūruru is the 'careless bittern'. Named after the chief who fell asleep at the end of an eel fishing expedition, he was defeated and captured by the enemy. In contrast, Matukutūreia is the 'watchful bittern'. Named after the chief who by his vigilance saved his pā and people.

Some sources have the names switched, with Matukutūruru as the watchful bittern.

=== Other names ===
The mountain appears on some early maps labelled as Manurewa. Manurewa is the name of a nearby residential suburb, derived from Te Manurewa o Tamapahore (“the drifted-away kite of Tamapahore”). According to legend, two brothers from Matukurua were flying kites. When Tamapahore’s kite rose the highest, his brother, Tamapahure, caused the kite’s cord to break, and it drifted away toward Hauraki.

Local settlers initially referred to it as White's Scoria Mountain, but from the 1920s it was generally known as Wiri Mountain. During the years the quarry was in operation various names were used, including Wiri Quarry. The chief Te Wirihana Takaanini was well known to early settlers, and his name is commemorated in the name of the suburb Wiri.

After the passing of the 2014 Redress Act the volcano is now officially named Matukutūruru.

== Geology ==
Covering around 18 hectares, Matukutūruru was created through a series of eruptions. The initial eruptions produced a crater with surrounding tuff ring. Subsequent fire-fountaining left a scoria cone reaching approximately 90 metres above sea level (60 metres higher than the surrounding land), completely burying the tuff ring. The cone had a single crater on its summit. The eruptions have been dated at 30,500 years by a combination of carbon-14, paleomagnetic, and argon-argon methods. Within error this is the same date as neighbouring Ash Hill.

The scoria cone has been almost completely quarried away; a small portion of the lower northern slopes is the only part that still exists. The quarrying exposed the complex geology of the site, including a cross section of the tuff ring with overlain lava flows. The southern faces of the northern quarry site exposed a sequence of lava flows formed by jointed basalt and scoria. The Roscommon Road cutting exposed bedded tuff overlain by basaltic lava flow.

Lava flows completely encircled the cone in all directions - with lava up to 18m deep extending 1km to the north and 1.5km to the south. Some spread across earlier flows from Matukutūreia. Most have been quarried away, and the land is now covered in industrial buildings. Quarrying of the northern flows left a large pit, which was subsequently filled.

=== Wiri Lava Cave ===
Wiri Lava Cave
- Cave survey. 1: Entrance. 2: Blocked source conduit. 3: Narrow side passage. 4: Low section of the cave. 5: Narrow vertical tube reaching to the surface.
- Coordinates: 37.006378°S 174.8591°E
- Length: 290 metres (950 ft)
- Geology: Lava tube, Scoria, Basalt
- Access: By permit only

The flows created a 290 metres (950 ft) long lava cave; extending from near the top of the cone remnants down a short vertical shaft, then diagonally down through a lava-lined tube beneath the scoria slopes and into the solid basalt, continuing horizontally across Wiri Station Road at a depth of approximately 4 metres (13 ft). The cave is up to 7.6 by 3.6 m (25 by 12 ft).

The cave has been labelled by the government as a "geological feature of national significance". It features smooth, gas-flazed rock surfaces, lava stalactites, circular tube gas vents, "festoon" ridging on the floors, vertical shafts formed by hot gas, and contraction gaps at the base of walls.

The most interesting parts of the cave are large enough for comfortable walking, with relatively easy entrance from the top of the cave. A manhole beside Wiri Station Road covers a narrow vertical shaft leading down to the horizontal part of the cave. The entrance is locked and the cave is not open to the public.

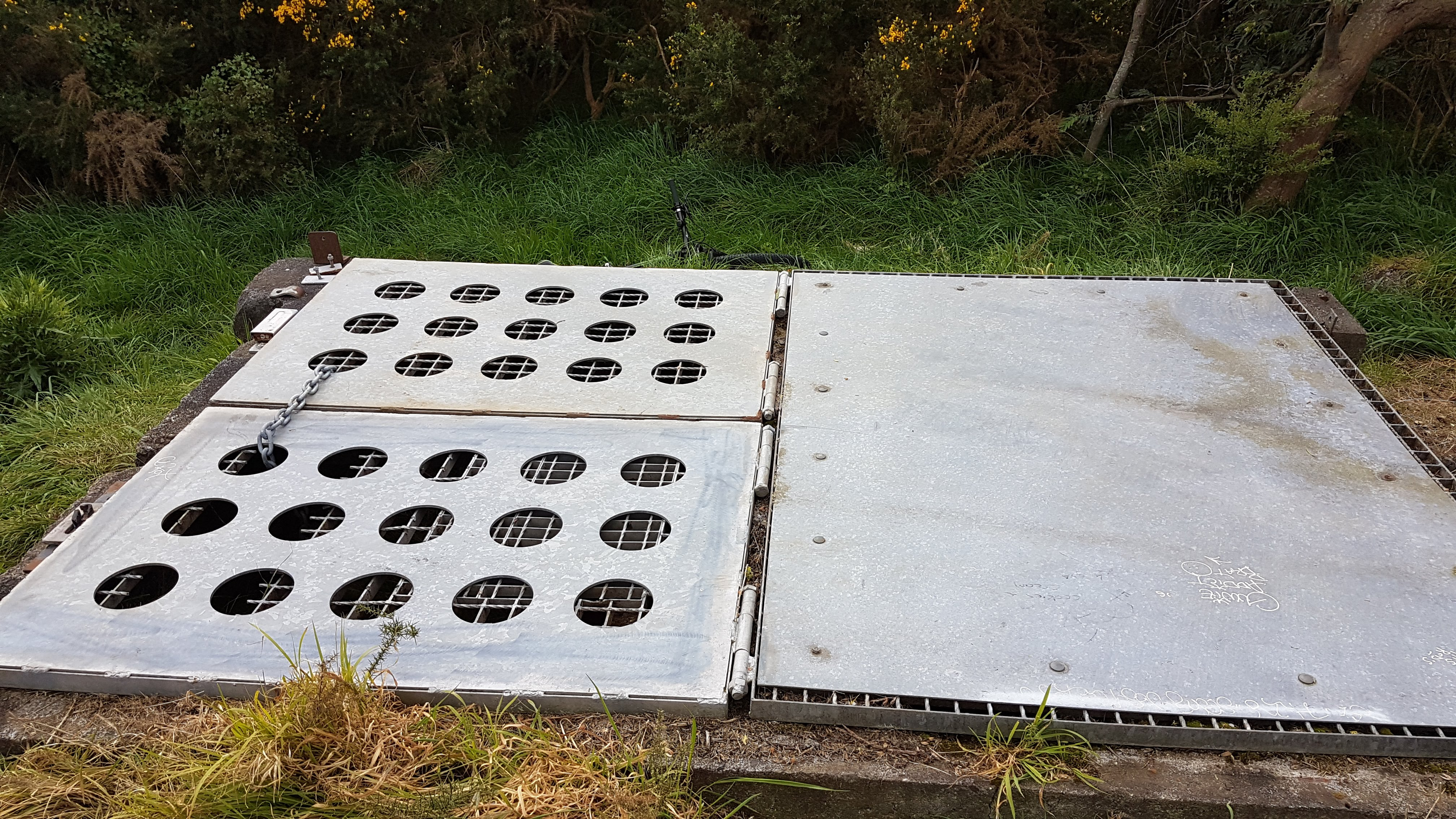
The entrance is secured by a locked trapdoor.

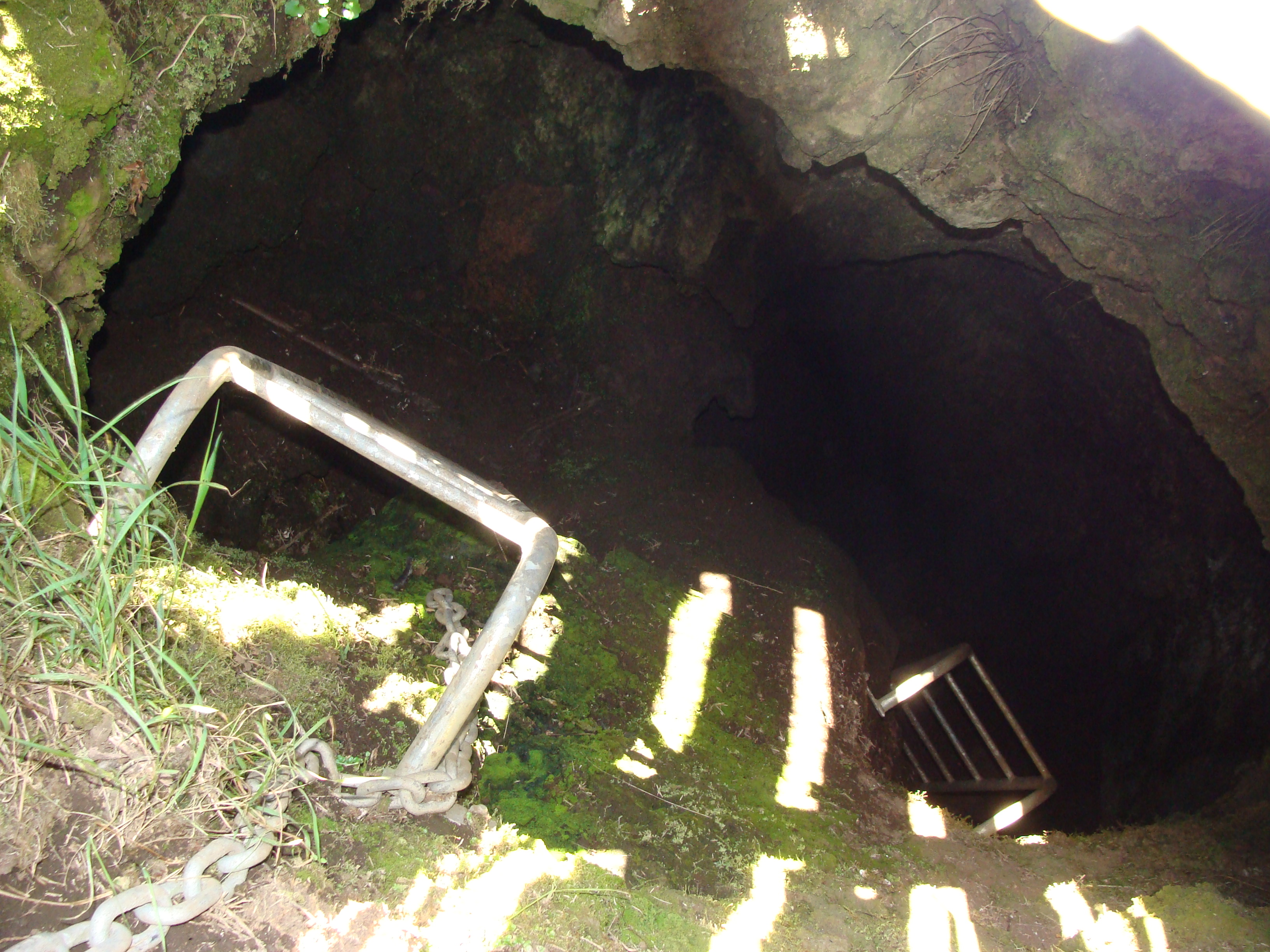
Looking down into the entrance.

=== Satellite Crater ===
Late in the eruption sequence a small (100 x 80 metre) explosion crater was formed 0.4km to the southeast. Early aerial photographs show a circular depression with a swampy bottom, but the crater site was flattened and now lies beneath an industrial subdivision.

=== Nearby Volcanoes ===
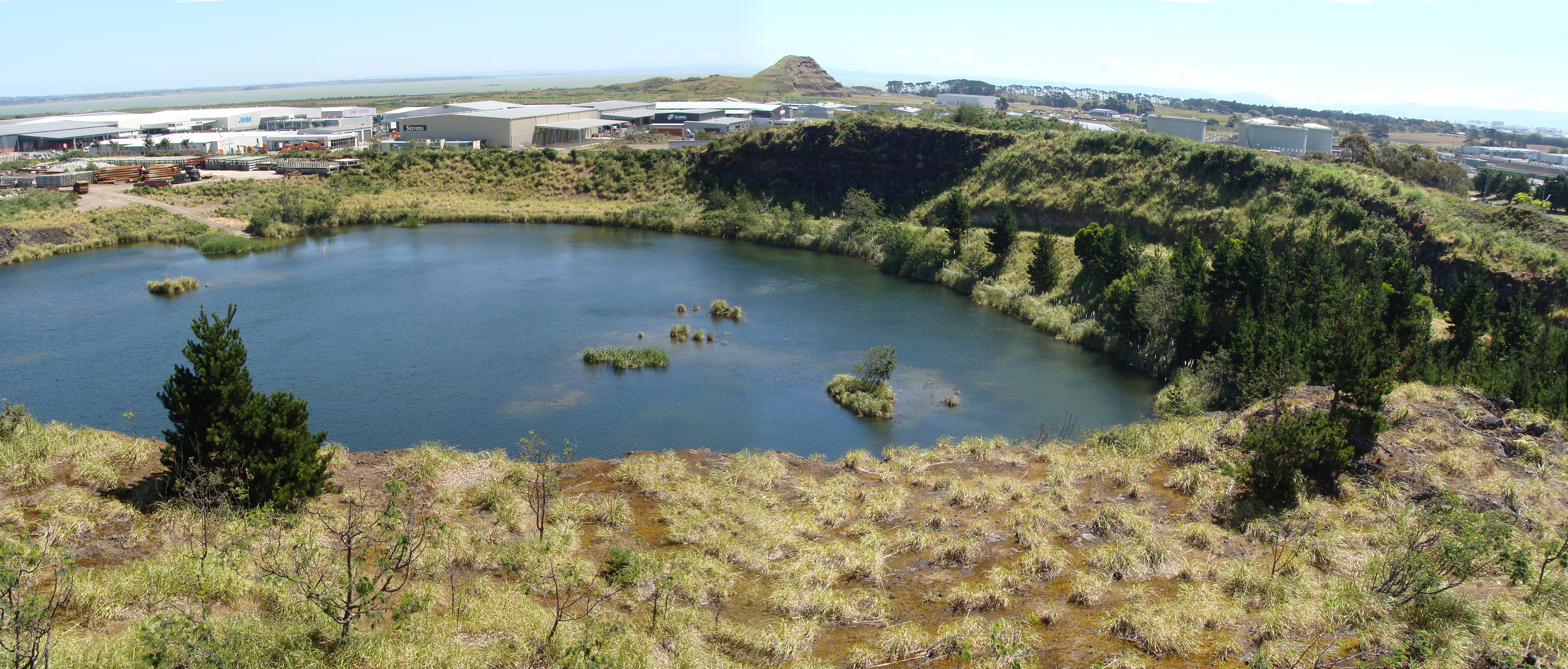
View of Matukutūreia from the remnants of Matukutūruru, 2010.

Matukutūruru lies in the middle of a line of three volcanoes in the Auckland volcanic field.

Ash Hill is 900 metres to the northeast. It has a similar age to Matukutūruru, but seems to have erupted slightly earlier and is recognised as a separate volcano. A low tuff cone with an explosion crater about 150 metres wide, it peaked at approximately 8 metres higher than the surrounding land. In recent years it was flattened and is now covered by industrial development.

To the southwest, Matukutūreia peaked at 73 metres above sea level. The scoria cone was originally crescent-shaped, before quarrying reduced to a pyramid-shaped mound. Some of the Matukutūruru lava flows spread across earlier flows from Matukutūreia.

Also nearby, but not on the same line, are the three Puhinui Craters. They are maar structures which could have the same origin, but this is not known to be the case.

== History ==
In pre-European Māori times, the Auckland Volcanic Field became one of the most densely populated areas of New Zealand. The volcanic cone of Matukutūruru was terraced and built upon, becoming a formidable defensive structure. The fertile volcanic soils surrounding the cone were easy to cultivate with wooden tools and were extensively used to grow food such as kūmara and taro. The Manukau Harbour and Puhinui Creek provided food, fresh water, and transport.

Later, European settlers saw a different value in the area. The rock-strewn landscape would have been difficult to cultivate with the plough, but the mountain was seen as a valuable source of building material. Subsequent quarrying activities reduced the mountain to small remnant, with the removed material mainly used to construct railways.

In recent times, coinciding with the end of the quarry's economic life, the area has been built over with industrial subdivisions. A small part of the mountain remains, now protected as a scientific and nature reserve and open to the public.

=== Māori occupation ===
Matukutūruru was the site of terraced pā. Around the slopes of the cone an extensive series of terraces were created, used for living, food storage and gardening. On the lower slopes, free-standing earth-and-stone walls were built radiating out from the cone — dividing into roughly wedge-shaped segments which were further subdivided by cross-walls.

Evidence of Māori occupation of the area dates back to the 13th century.

Huakaiwaka was a chief with a pā at Matukutūruru in the 17th century. He is known as the leader who founded Te Waiohua by uniting the tribes living around the Manukau Harbour.

Te Waiohua occupied the area until around 1740 when Te Taoū waged war on Te Waiohua and killed their chief Kiwi Tāmaki, defeating them. They fled to the Waikato. In the 1780s the descendants of Kiwi Tāmaki, Te Ākitai Waiohua, returned and re-established the settlement at Wiri.

The introduction of the musket created a period of great instability in the region. By 1821, with the threat of Ngāpuhi war parties from northland armed with muskets, all volcanic cone pā of Tāmaki Makaurau were virtually abandoned as defensive fortresses. When the first European missionaries passed through the area in 1834 they reported little evidence of occupation by māori.

=== European occupation ===
Extent of the Fairburn Purchase and Clendon's Grant. Granted to James Reddy Clendon Extent of the "Fairburn purchase"

In the 1830s William Fairburn, a missionary with the Church Missionary Society, claimed to have purchased most of South Auckland (83,000 acres, stretching from Papatoetoe to Papakura) from Māori. After the treaty signing in 1840, the purchase was examined by the newly formed Colony of New Zealand. Fairburn was allowed to keep a seventh of the land, with the Crown keeping the "surplus lands", including Matukutūruru.

Matukutūruru was part of a 10,000 acre block granted by the Government to the trader James Reddy Clendon in 1840 — known as the Clendon Grant.

Beginning in the 1800s the cone which once reached 50m higher than the surrounding land began to be quarried away. Visiting geologist Ferdinand von Hochstetter, employed by the government to make the first geological survey of the islands in 1864, stated that the "scoria cones supply the road metal for Great South Rd."

=== Railway ownership ===
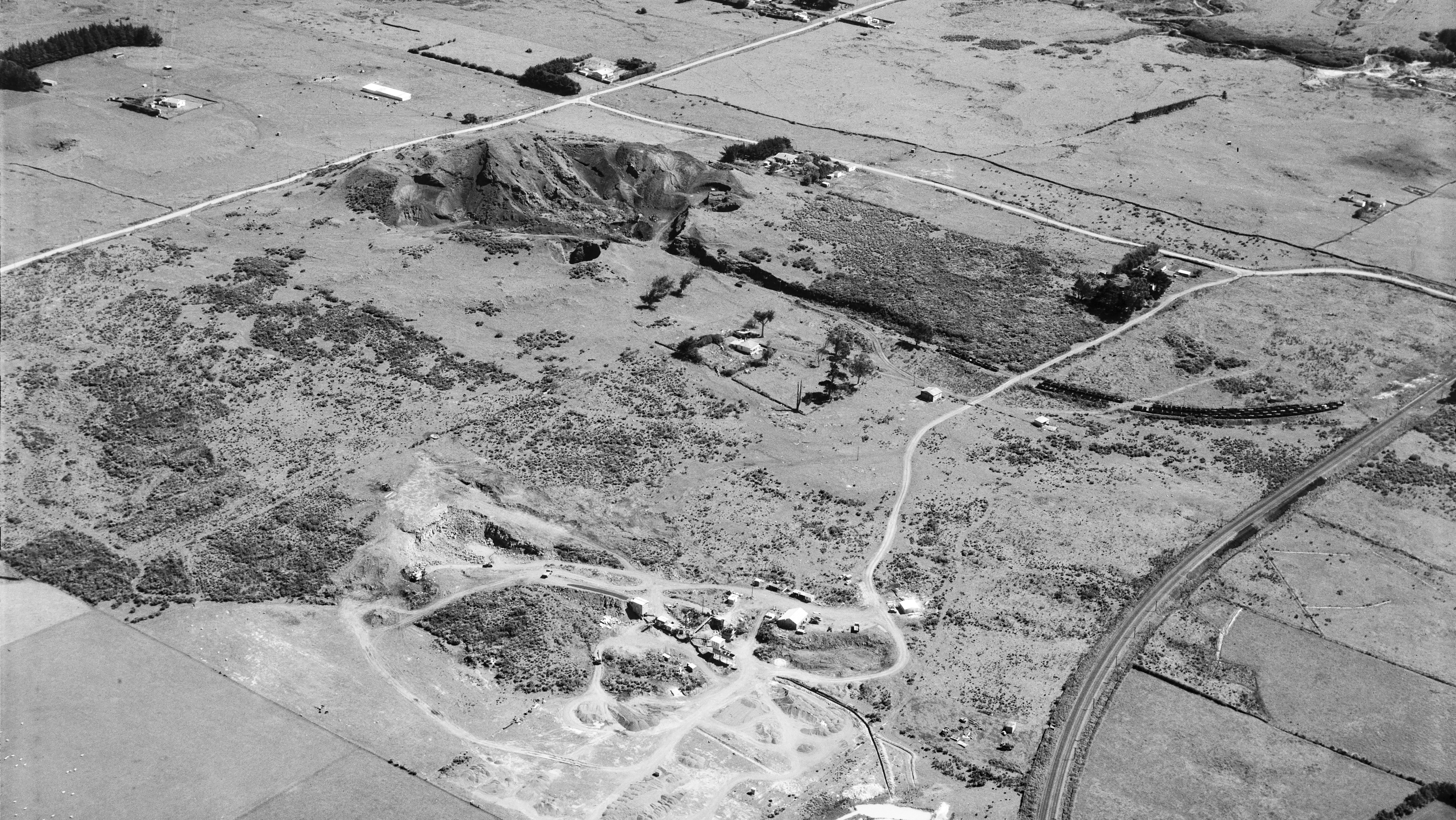
The southern quarry in 1958. The railway is visible at the bottom right with a spur running directly into the mountain, which has been extensively quarried.

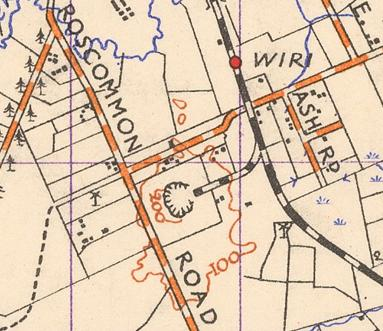
In this 1946 topographical map Matukutūruru is depicted as an unnamed quarry.

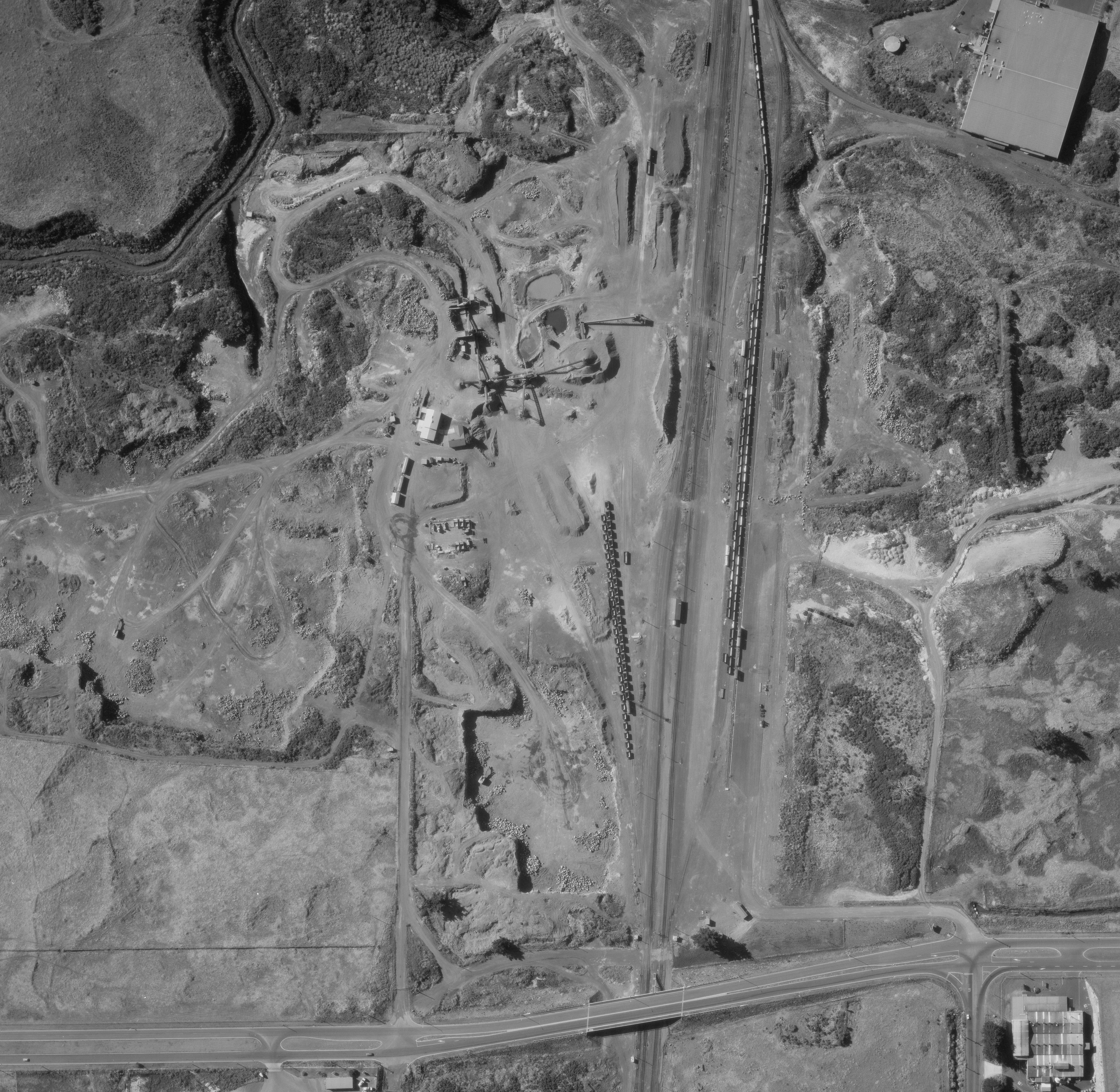
Wiri railway station, 1982. To the left is the northern quarry. At the bottom is the bridge with embankments of scoria.

==== Southern quarry ====
In 1880 Alexander Whyte bought the mountain and land surrounding it. In March 1915, New Zealand Government Railways (NGR) purchased 38 acres of property from the trustees of Alexander Whyte, including the "hill of scoria" and a corridor providing access to the main railway. Shortly after, a further 6 acres immediately to the east was also purchased.

NGR and NZ Railways Corporation (NZRC) intermittently operated the quarry on the mountain, starting in 1915 and continuing until the 1990s. The removed material was mostly used for construction of railways, providing ballast as far south as Ohakune. In later years some was sold.

For several years Downer and Co Ltd worked under contract with the council quarrying the Mountain to provide fill for the embankment of the Wiri Station Road railway overbridge, which was completed in 1981.

Quarrying in the 1990s created a lake up to 5 metres lower than the surrounding land, which remained for several decades before being filled to prepare for industrial development.

==== Northern quarry ====
The main railway line to the east of the mountain was opened in 1875. The Wiri railway station opened in 1913, as an 'industrial' station to provide access for quarry workers.

In 1917 the New Zealand Railways Department developed a large quarry to the west of the station on the northern lava flows of Matukutūruru. This was used to supply ballast for the railways, eventually replacing the Mt Albert and Mt Smart pits; these closed in 1928 and the 1960s, respectively.

By August 2011 the quarry had been closed pending future development.

=== Rumney Cottage ===
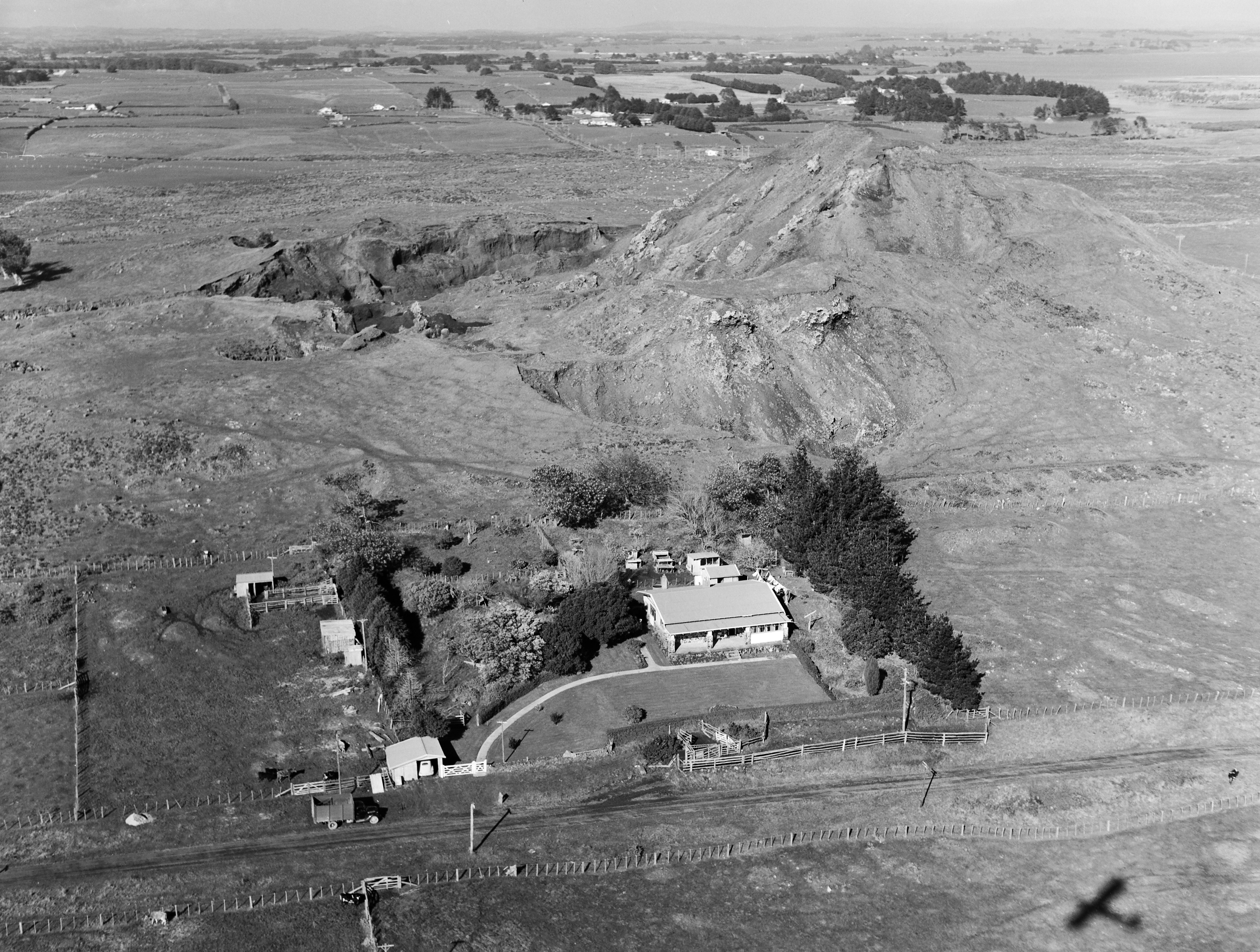
The earliest known aerial photograph of Matukutūruru, taken in 1949. Jacaranda house is in the foreground.

In 1924 a section of the lower northern slope was purchased by Harold Forrest. Unable to service his State Advances loan, this land eventually ended up in the hands of farmer Ernie Shepherd. Around 1928 Jacaranda House (later known as Rumney Cottage) was built. The Californian style bungalow was built using basalt and scoria quarried from the volcano and took its name from the large tree beside it. The inside of the house originally had 3–4 bedrooms. In 1963, the property was bought by the Crown for railway purposes, under the Public Works Act 1928 and Railways Act 1949. Mr Shepherd continued to live in the house until his death in 1972. The house was then leased to various families, and it became known as the quarry manager's house.

=== Protection of the cave ===
In 1970 the cave was scheduled for protection as a place of "scientific interest" in the City of Manukau District Scheme. In 1986 the Department of Lands and Survey proposed to acquire the land enclosing the cave for a scientific reserve, but NZRC responded that it intended to maximise quarrying of the available resource. In 1987 the cave was granted interim protection by NZRC. Minister of Conservation Helen Clark (who later became the 37th Prime Minister of New Zealand) indicated that she believed the survival of the cave undamaged was "reasonably well assured".

In 1988 NZRC entered into agreements with Refac Holdings Ltd, intending to "extract and remove" the minerals on the site. On 15 October 1989 the agreements with Refac were cancelled and NZRC then entered into a joint venture agreement with Downer Group to extract the minerals, excluding the cave area. The agreement included guarantees that Downer Group and its contractors would not damage the cave area. NZRC indicated that its intention was to subdivide the land for industrial development after the quarrying was completed.

After nearly 30 years of lobbying, the cave site was transferred to the Department of Conservation. The gazetting of the Wiri Lava Cave Scientific Reserve was signed in 1998 in the cave itself by the minister of conservation Steve Chadwick, who used the back of campaigner Les Kermode as a writing desk. From 1998 to 2014 it was impossible to obtain permission to access the cave - the department made claims that the active quarrying nearby made it unsafe, that entry required a management plan, or that iwi had not given their formal blessing to allow entry.

=== Industrial development ===
In 2008 the remaining land of the former cone (not including the reserve) was transferred to Winstone Aggregates (a subsidiary of Fletcher Building). The government exchanged the two former quarries for the remnants of the stonefields and volcanic cone of Matukutūreia. Fletcher sold the property in 2015 to NZ Cleanfill Limited, later acquired by developer Euroclass. The lake which had formed in the 1990s was drained, and the site was flattened. By January 2025 construction of the "Basalt Business Park" had been finished, completely filling the land where the bulk of the mountain once stood with roads and industrial buildings.

In late 2011 the northern quarry lake was drained. Water from the site of the quarry was pumped into sediment control ponds before being discharged to Puhinui Stream, it was then filled with spoil from the construction of the City Rail Link tunnels. Wiri Maintenance and Stabling Depot - an extensive maintenance facility for electric trains - has been built on the site of the northern quarry, with the balance being turned into an industrial subdivision.

=== Treaty settlement ===
In 2014, the Ngā Mana Whenua o Tāmaki Makaurau Collective Redress Deed passed into law. Through the Treaty of Waitangi settlement between the Crown and the Tāmaki Collective, ownership of Matukutūruru was vested to the collective. The legislation specified that the land be held in trust "for the common benefit of Ngā Mana Whenua o Tāmaki Makaurau and the other people of Auckland". The Tūpuna Maunga Authority (TMA) is the co-governance organisation established. Auckland Council manages the lands under the direction of the TMA. The law gives the volcano the official name Matukutūruru.

TMA intends to restore the ecosystem of the remnants; including around 5,400 ferns, karaka, puriri, totara, mahoe, mangeao, puka, kohekohe and titoki to be planted by 2021.
