= Auckland Region Women's Corrections Facility =

Prison in New Zealand

Coordinates: 37.010503°S 174.850974°E

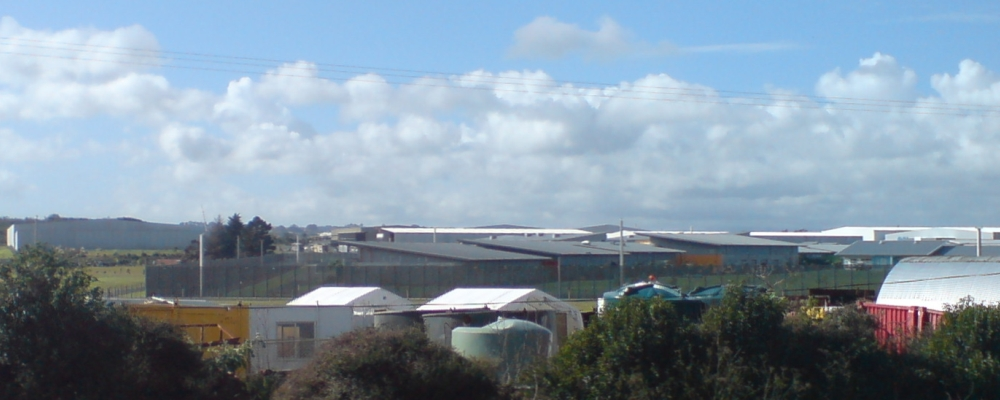
The prison viewed over nearby properties

Auckland Region Women's Corrections Facility (ARWCF) is a women's prison in the Wiri suburb of South Auckland, New Zealand. Also in the vicinity are the Auckland South Corrections Facility and Korowai Manaaki Youth Justice Facility. It opened in 2006 and is the first purpose-built women's prison in New Zealand; there are two older women's prisons. About 6 per cent of the New Zealand prisoner population is female.

The facility houses about 330 prisoners including remand prisoners - people who have been charged but not convicted, or convicted but not yet sentenced - as well as sentenced prisoners. It has a specialist unit for mothers and babies. A small number of women give birth while serving a sentence of imprisonment and others have young children at the time of sentencing. Some prisoners with babies (up to two years) may be eligible to live in the mothers and babies unit.

The prison is built in a rehabilitated quarry site. Construction of the 38 buildings cost NZ$159 million and was carried out substantially by Sinclair Knight Merz. The site is 47 ha in size, of which 13 ha are currently covered by buildings, leaving room for future expansion, which was included in the design parameters.
