= Wiri =

- Suburb
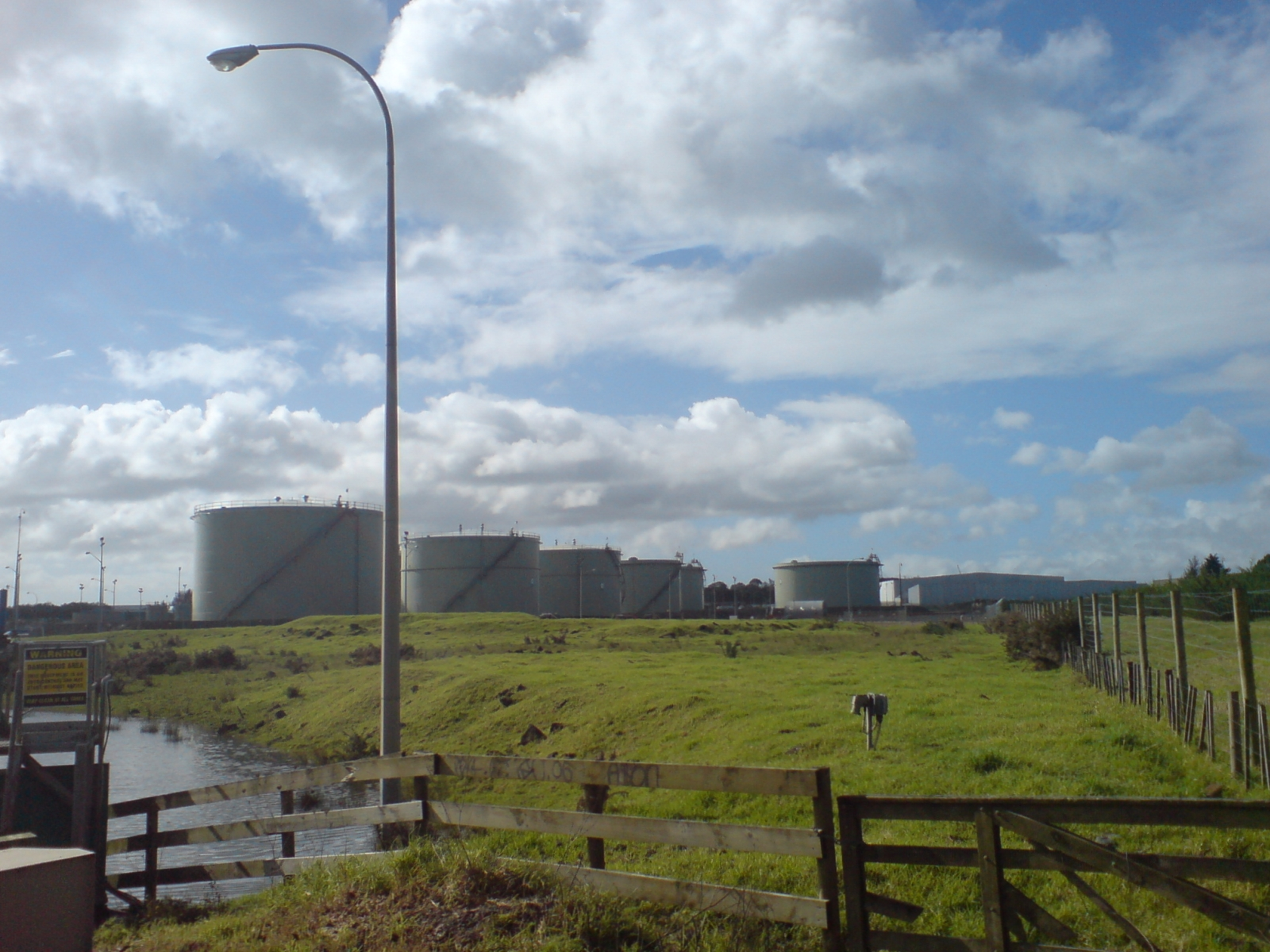
- A petroleum-product storage depot at the western edge of Wiri
- Interactive map of Wiri
- Coordinates: 37.000°S 174.873°E
- Country: New Zealand
- City: Auckland
- Local authority: Auckland Council
- Electoral ward: Manurewa-Papakura ward
- Local board: Manurewa Local Board

Area
  - Land: 940 ha (2,300 acres)

Population (June 2025)
  - Total: 7,250
  - Density: 770/km^{2} (2,000/sq mi)
- Train stations: Wiri Train Station (closed)

Papatoetoe, Māngere	Papatoetoe	Manukau Central
(Manukau Harbour)	Wiri	Goodwood Heights
(Manukau Harbour)	Clendon Park	Homai

Wiri is a mostly industrial-commercial focused suburb in Auckland, New Zealand. It was formerly part of Manukau City until the merger of all of Auckland's councils into the 'super city' in 2010.

== Etymology ==
The suburb is named after Te Wirihana Takaanini, 19th-century Māori chief of Te Ākitai Waiohua.

== History ==
=== Māori history ===
The area has been inhabited since at least the 13th century. The volcanic cones of Matukutūreia and Matukutūruru were home to two hilltop pā, collectively known as Matukurua.

The area has significance for Waiohua iwi, especially Ngāti Te Ata Waiohua and Te Ākitai Waiohua.

=== Colonial era ===
Clendon's Grant. Granted to James Reddy Clendon Extent of the Fairburn Purchase

In January 1836 missionary William Thomas Fairburn brokered a land sale between Tāmaki Māori chiefs, Pōtatau Te Wherowhero and Turia of Ngāti Te Rau, covering the majority of modern-day South Auckland between Ōtāhuhu and Papakura. The sale was envisioned as a way to end hostilities in the area, but it is unclear what the chiefs understood or consented to. Māori continued to live in South Auckland, unchanged by this sale.

Fairburn was criticised for the sheer size of the purchase, and in 1842 the Crown significantly reduced the size of his land holdings, and the Crown partitioned much of the land for European settlers.

10,000 acres of the Fairburn purchase was granted to James Reddy Clendon in return for land at Russell where the new capital of New Zealand was established. Clendon never lived in or visited the area.

=== Woodside ===
The Woodside School began operating from the mid-1850s in Wiri, then known by the name Woodside. It operated from the Methodist church, until school buildings were built on the corner of Kerrs Road and Great South Road in 1873. In 1875, the Manurewa railway station opened, causing the township of Woodside to slowly decline while Manurewa grew. After years of debate, the school moved to its current site, which opened on 8 September 1906.

=== Industrial Development ===
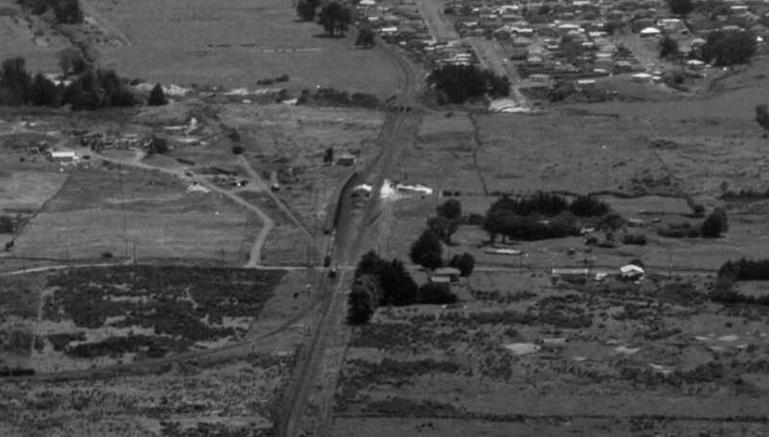
Aerial photograph of Wiri station in 1961

The North Island Main Trunk line through Wiri was opened on 20 May 1875, as part of the Auckland and Mercer Railway, built by Brogden & Co, who extended it from Penrose.

The Wiri railway station originally opened on 7 August 1913 as a tablet station, and fully on 9 December 1913 as a siding and for staff and work trains (not a public station). The station closed in 2005. The small station building, completed in 1914, was donated to MOTAT in 2022.

Wiri developed as a large industrial area during the 1960s and 1970s due to the suburban expansion of Manukau City.

== Notable places ==
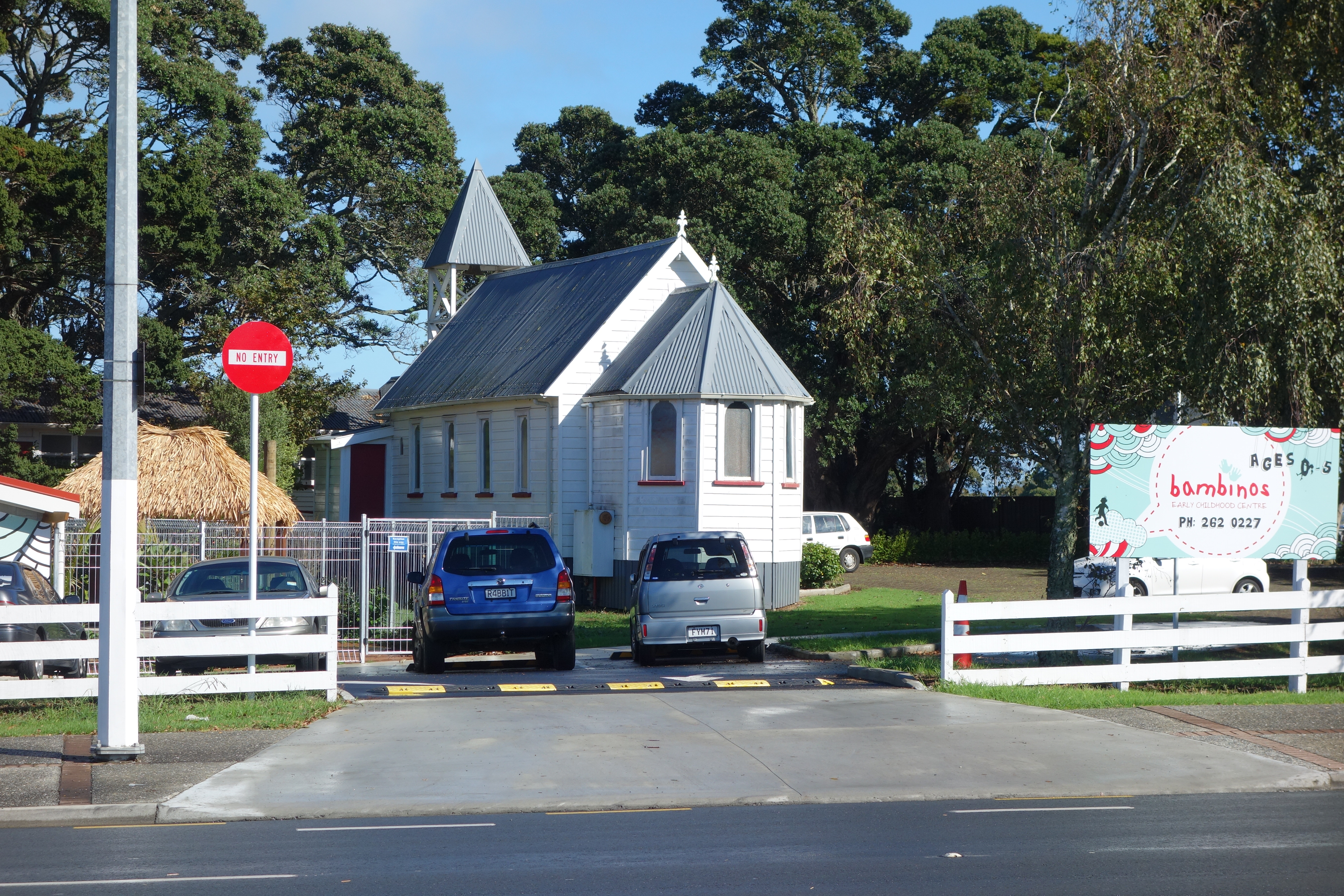
St David's Anglican Church, 2015

St Davis Church was built in 1880. In 1883 a chancel was added on. The Church walls contain records of people that lived in Wiri.

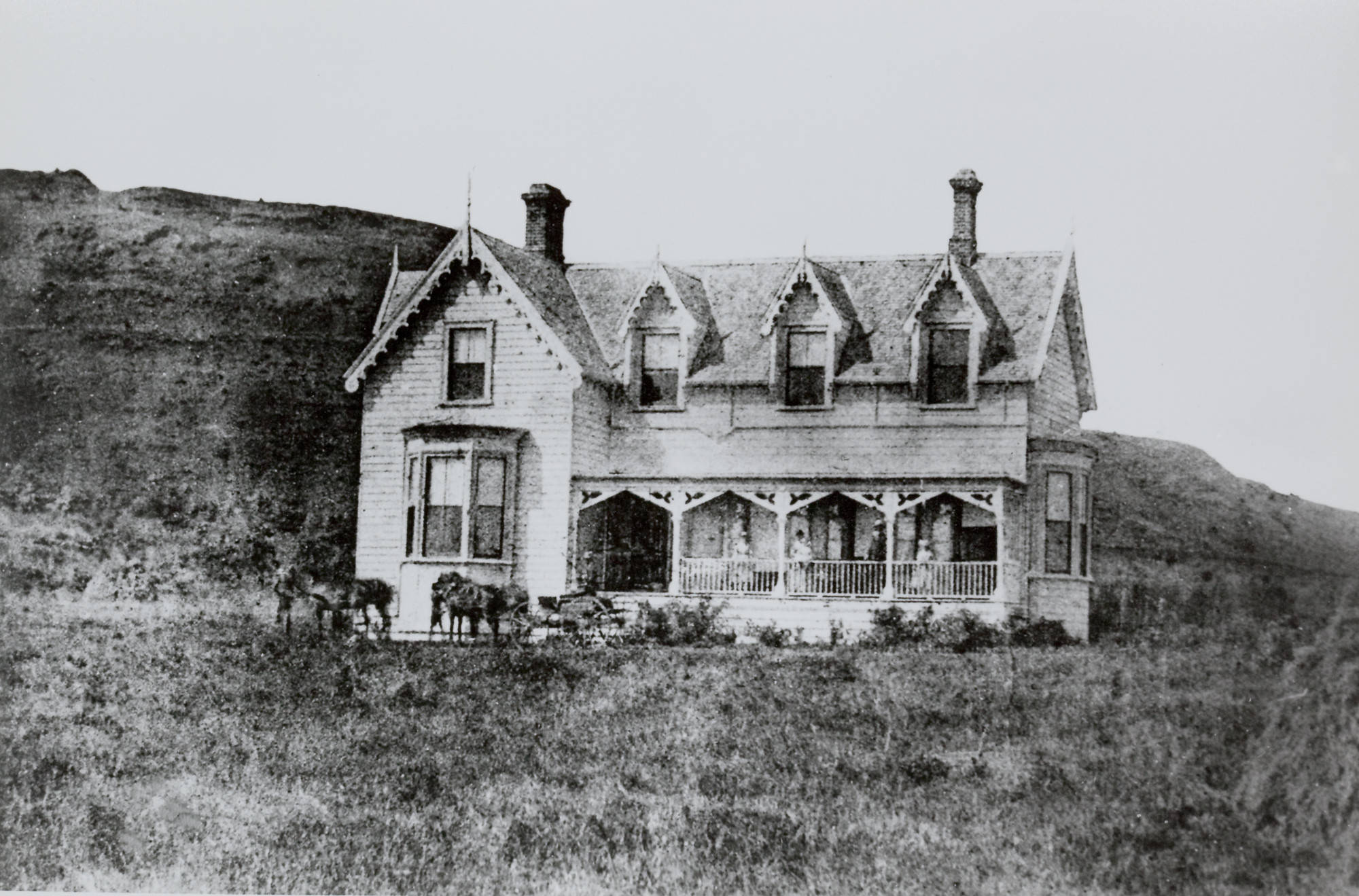
William McLaughlin's house 'Puhi Nui', built on the north-eastern side of Matukutūreia.

In 1845 Thomas McLaughlin, a wealthy merchant from Peru, bought a tract of land in the northern part of the Clendon Grant, including the volcano now known as Matukutūreia / McLaughlins Mountain. In the 1850s a small quarry was established there to supply metal for the construction of Great South Road. Thomas's son, William McLaughlin, later built a house on the north-eastern flank of the mountain. The homestead was known as 'Puhi Nui'. From 1965 the family rented the homestead out. On 12 February 1982 the building was removed to Howick Historical Village, where it has since been restored.

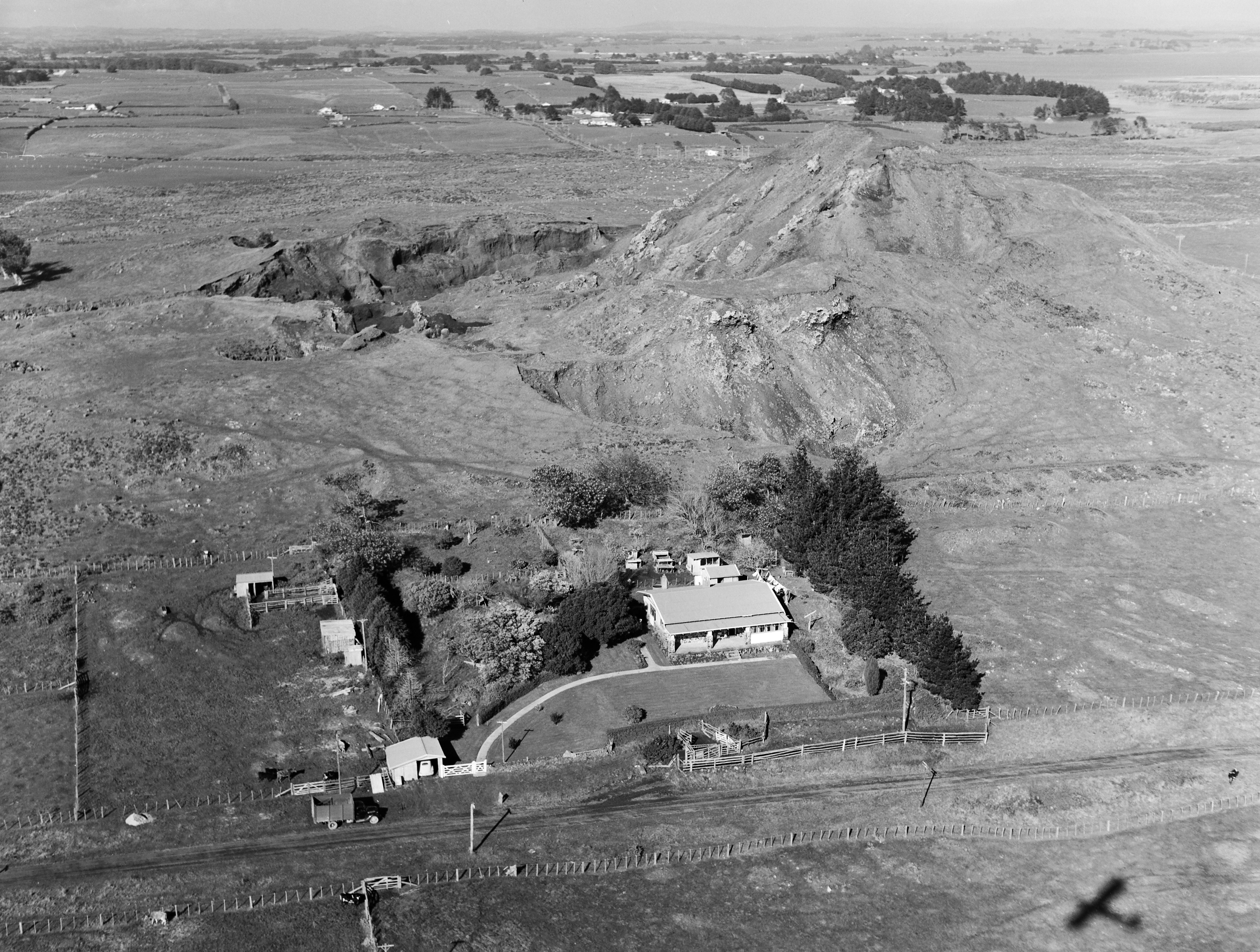
Aerial photograph of Jacaranda house with Matukutūruru in the background, 1949.

Around 1928 Jacaranda House (later known as Rumney Cottage) was built on the lower northern slope of Matukutūruru. The house was built using basalt and scoria quarried from the volcano and took its name from the large tree beside it. Mr Shepherd continued to live in the house until his death in 1972. Bought by the government for railway purposes, the house is now part of the Matukutūruru reserve.

Auckland Region Women's Corrections Facility (ARWCF) is located in Wiri. ARWCF is the first purpose-built women's prison in New Zealand to accommodate a growing number of female prisoners and services in the upper North Island. The facility can accommodate 286 prisoners and employs 167 staff.

The adjacent Auckland South Corrections Facility is a high security men's prison which opened in 2015. It is operated by Serco New Zealand under a Public Private Partnership with the Department of Corrections. at 20 Hautu Drive, Wiri.

== Transport ==
=== Rail ===
As part of the Auckland railway electrification project, Wiri Maintenance & Stabling Depot, a $100 million EMU maintenance and stabling depot, was built on 4.4 hectares of the old Winstone Quarry in Wiri. Located to the west of the North Island Main Trunk between Wiri Station Road and the South-Western Motorway. It was officially opened by the Mayor of Auckland on 5 July 2013.

Next to the depot is Wiri railway station, originally opened on 7 August 1913 as a tablet station, and fully on 9 December 1913 as a siding and for staff and work trains (not a public station). The station was closed on 14 February 2005 then re-opened in July 2013 for train crew changes. The new station platform is accessed by a bridge that connects to the depot.

To the east of the depot and railway station, Wiri inland port connects road freight to the Ports of Auckland on the Waitemata Harbour further north. The inland port allows the Ports of Auckland to reduce the number of trucks that have to travel through the Auckland Central area by up to 100,000 trips per year.

=== Road ===
By 1855 the Great South Road passed through Wiri, constructed by British Army troops.

State Highway 20 (SH20), also known as the Southwestern Motorway, is to the north of Wiri. It forms the southern part of the Western Ring Route, a 48 kilometres (30 mi) motorway route bypassing central Auckland. State Highway 20B (SH20B) runs through Wiri, connecting the SH20 to Auckland Airport. The creation of SH20B, began through a series of widening and extension projects on Puhinui Road, including the creation of the Pukaki Bridge in 1996. In August 2003 the Puhinui Road Interchange opened, replacing the Puhinui Road/Southwestern Motorway roundabout.

== Geology ==
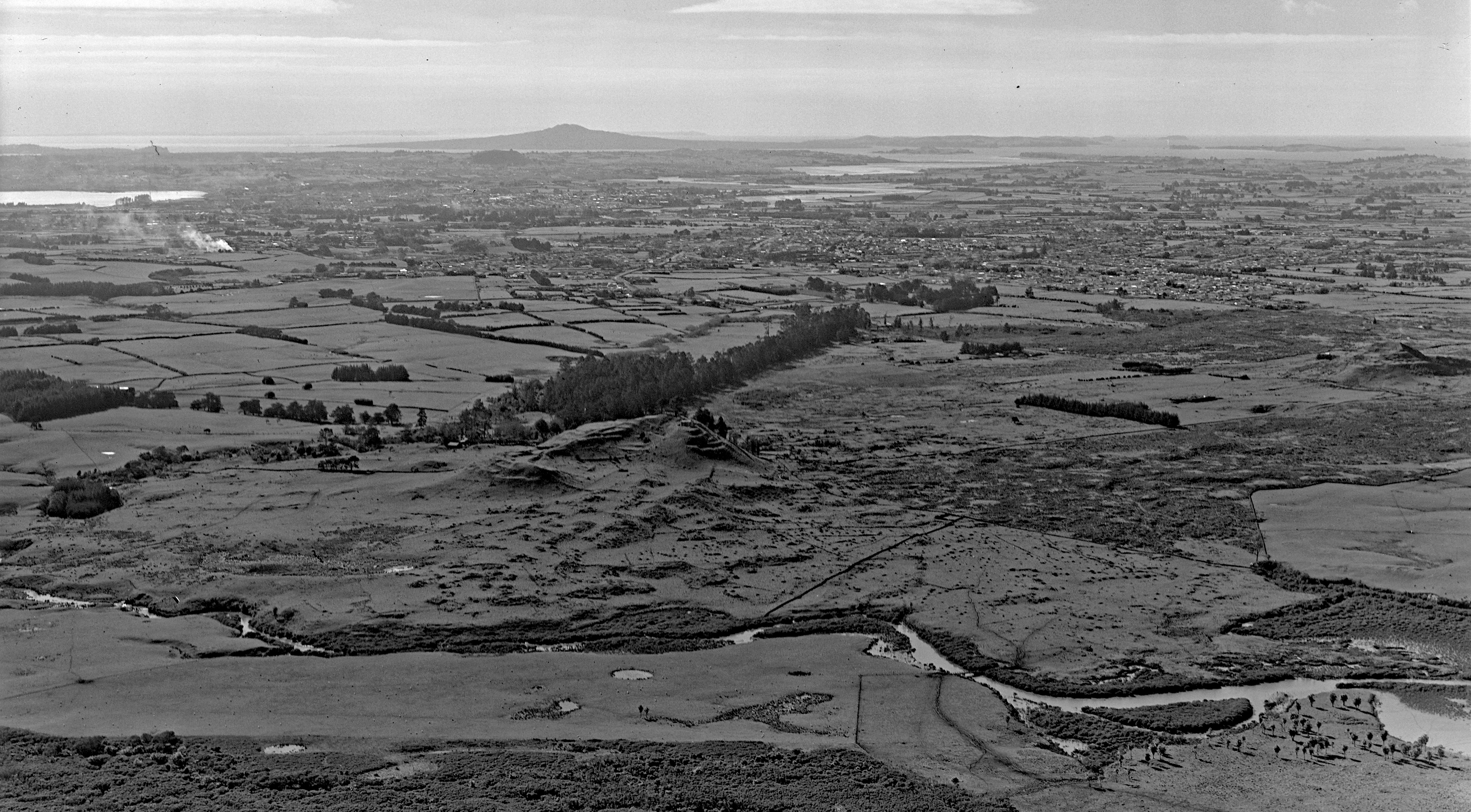
Aerial photograph of Matukutūreia before large-scale quarrying, 1952. Puhinui Creek is in the foreground. The quarried remnants of Matukutūruru can be seen on the far right. In the background are Papatoetoe and Ōtāhuhu, prehistoric portage routes between the Manukau Harbour on the left and Hauraki Gulf on the right. The silhouette of Rangitoto dominates the horizon.

The Matukutūruru (Wiri Mountain) and Matukutūreia (McLaughlin's Mountain) volcanoes are in Wiri. Much of the land within the suburb of Wiri was formed through lava flows originating from the eruption of Matukutūruru 30,000 years ago.

Several recently discovered volcanic craters are in Wiri. The three Puhinui Craters were first recognised as volcanic craters in 2011. Ash Hill is near Ash Road. A low tuff cone with an explosion crater about 150m wide, it peaked at roughly 8 metres higher than the surrounding land, but has recently been flattened and completely covered by industrial development.

== Education ==
Wiri Central School is a full primary school (years 1–8) with a roll of 352 as of July 2026.

Destiny School is a private Christian composite school (years 1–13) with a roll of 13 as of July 2026.

Both schools are coeducational.

== Statistics ==
=== Climate ===
Climate data for Wiri (1981–2010)
Month	Jan	Feb	Mar	Apr	May	Jun	Jul	Aug	Sep	Oct	Nov	Dec	Year
Mean daily maximum °C (°F)	23.0 (73.4)	23.4 (74.1)	22.1 (71.8)	19.7 (67.5)	17.3 (63.1)	15.1 (59.2)	14.3 (57.7)	14.7 (58.5)	16.1 (61.0)	17.4 (63.3)	19.1 (66.4)	21.2 (70.2)	18.6 (65.5)
Daily mean °C (°F)	19.2 (66.6)	19.7 (67.5)	18.3 (64.9)	15.8 (60.4)	13.7 (56.7)	11.6 (52.9)	10.6 (51.1)	11.3 (52.3)	12.8 (55.0)	14.1 (57.4)	15.8 (60.4)	17.8 (64.0)	15.1 (59.1)
Mean daily minimum °C (°F)	15.4 (59.7)	16.0 (60.8)	14.4 (57.9)	11.9 (53.4)	10.0 (50.0)	8.0 (46.4)	6.9 (44.4)	7.8 (46.0)	9.4 (48.9)	10.8 (51.4)	12.4 (54.3)	14.4 (57.9)	11.5 (52.6)
Source: NIWA

=== Demographics ===
Wiri covers 9.40 km^{2} (3.63 sq mi) and had an estimated population of 7,250 as of June 2025, with a population density of 771 people per km^{2}.

Historical population
Year	Pop.	±% p.a.
2006	3,867	—
2013	3,924	+0.21%
2018	5,355	+6.42%
2023	6,504	+3.96%

Wiri had a population of 6,504 in the 2023 New Zealand census, an increase of 1,149 people (21.5%) since the 2018 census, and an increase of 2,580 people (65.7%) since the 2013 census. There were 3,414 males, 3,075 females and 12 people of other genders in 1,533 dwellings. 2.9% of people identified as LGBTIQ+. The median age was 31.3 years (compared with 38.1 years nationally). There were 1,449 people (22.3%) aged under 15 years, 1,602 (24.6%) aged 15 to 29, 2,901 (44.6%) aged 30 to 64, and 555 (8.5%) aged 65 or older.

People could identify as more than one ethnicity. The results were 21.3% European (Pākehā); 31.1% Māori; 43.8% Pasifika; 22.4% Asian; 1.6% Middle Eastern, Latin American and African New Zealanders (MELAA); and 0.6% other, which includes people giving their ethnicity as "New Zealander". English was spoken by 90.0%, Māori language by 9.7%, Samoan by 16.3%, and other languages by 19.5%. No language could be spoken by 2.8% (e.g. too young to talk). New Zealand Sign Language was known by 1.1%. The percentage of people born overseas was 35.0, compared with 28.8% nationally.

Religious affiliations were 47.4% Christian, 4.8% Hindu, 3.0% Islam, 4.2% Māori religious beliefs, 1.5% Buddhist, 0.2% New Age, 0.1% Jewish, and 3.3% other religions. People who answered that they had no religion were 28.6%, and 7.6% of people did not answer the census question.

Of those at least 15 years old, 702 (13.9%) people had a bachelor's or higher degree, 2,478 (49.0%) had a post-high school certificate or diploma, and 1,875 (37.1%) people exclusively held high school qualifications. The median income was $24,400, compared with $41,500 nationally. 177 people (3.5%) earned over $100,000 compared to 12.1% nationally. The employment status of those at least 15 was that 2,040 (40.4%) people were employed full-time, 408 (8.1%) were part-time, and 366 (7.2%) were unemployed.

Individual statistical areas
Name	Area (km^{2})	Population	Density (per km^{2})	Dwellings	Median age	Median income
Wiri West	8.03	1,479	184	147	34.2 years	—
Wiri North	0.66	2,889	4,377	768	29.9 years	$29,600
Wiri East	0.71	2,136	3,008	618	29.9 years	$35,800
New Zealand					38.1 years	$41,500
