= Kahupāke Rongonui =

New Zealand tribal leader (c. 1868–1947)

Kahupāke Rongonui (c. 1868/1869 – 17 January 1947) was a notable New Zealand tribal leader. Of Māori descent, she identified with the Te Ākitai Waiohua iwi. She was born in Auckland, New Zealand in about 1868.
