= Ash Hill, New Zealand =

Volcano in New Zealand

Ash Hill
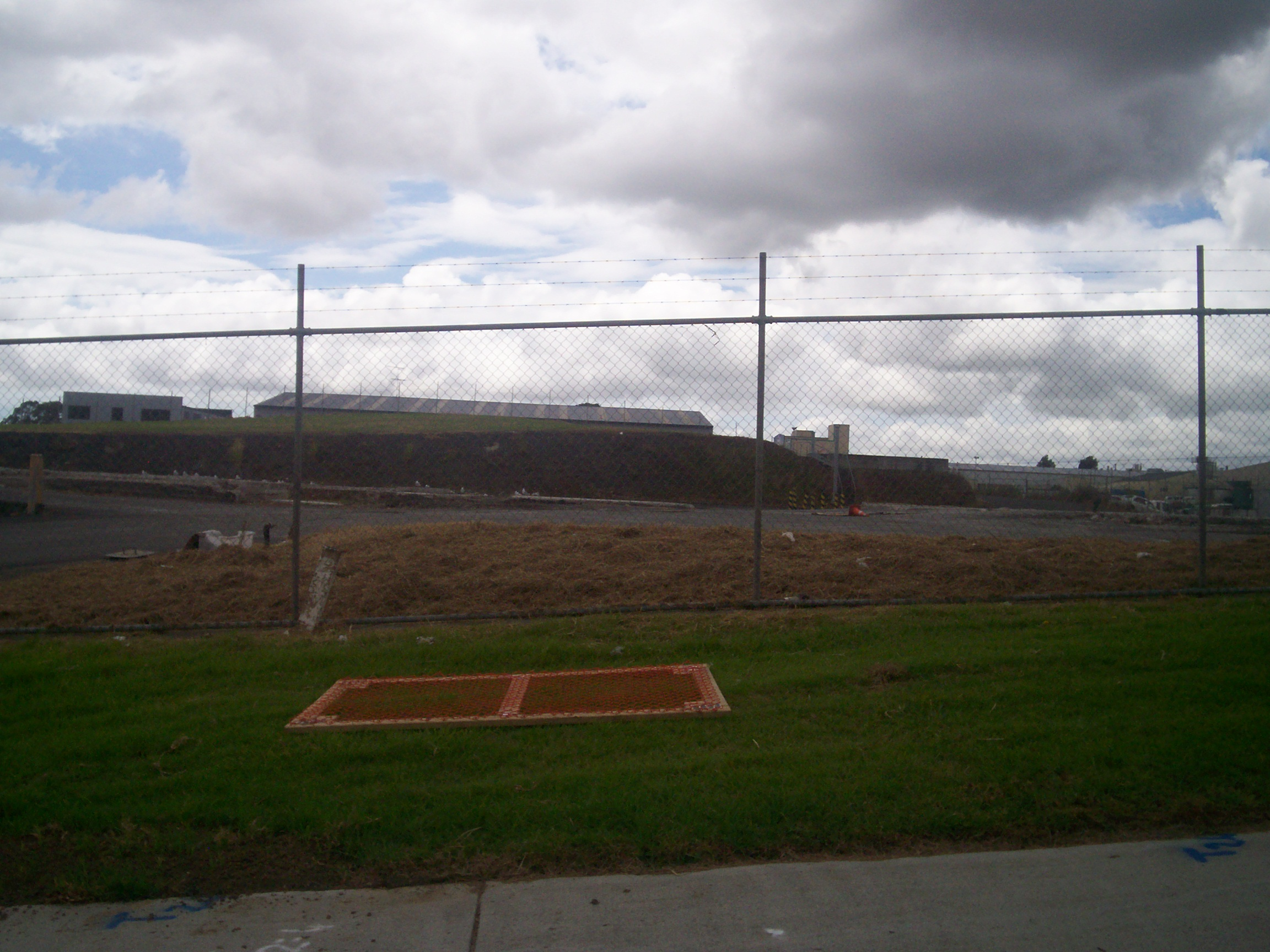
- Likely one of few clear remains of Ash Hill, as viewed from Ash Road.

Highest point
- Elevation: 30 m (98 ft)(before subdivision)
- Coordinates: 37.002754°S 174.867545°E

Geography
- Location: Wiri, North Island, New Zealand

Geology
- Rock age: 31,800 years
- Volcanic field: Auckland volcanic field

Ash Hill is a volcano in Wiri, in the Auckland volcanic field, in New Zealand. A low tuff cone with an explosion crater about 150m wide, it is now covered by industrial development. It peaked at roughly 30 metres above sea level (approximately 8 metres higher than the surrounding land).

Ash Hill was named after nearby Ash Road by Searle. Ash Road was named after ash trees, not volcanic ash. Radiocarbon dating gave Ash Hill the age of 31,800 +/- 159 calendar years BP, a similar age to nearby Wiri Mountain.

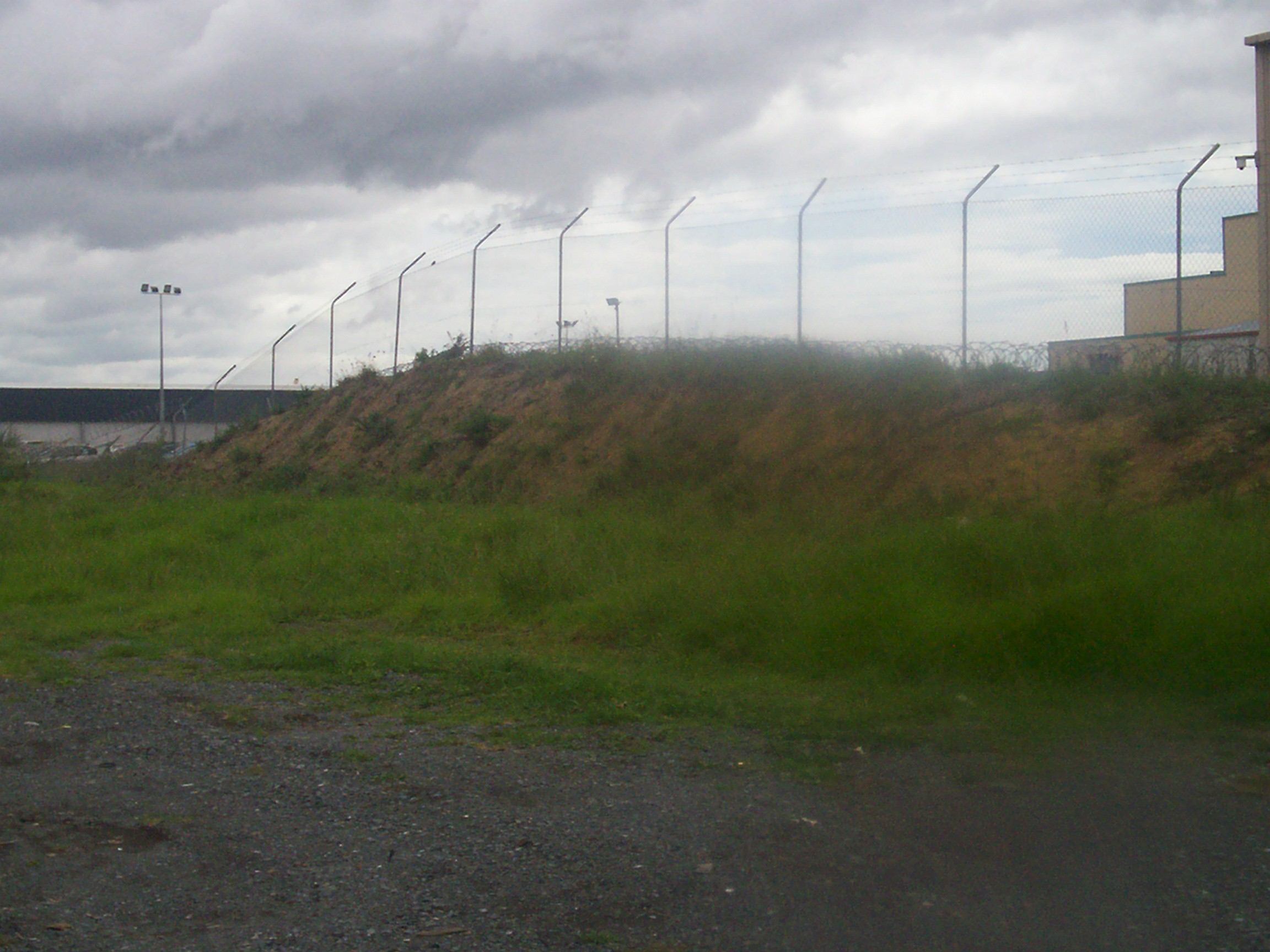
A piece of Ash Hill, viewed from Oak Road.

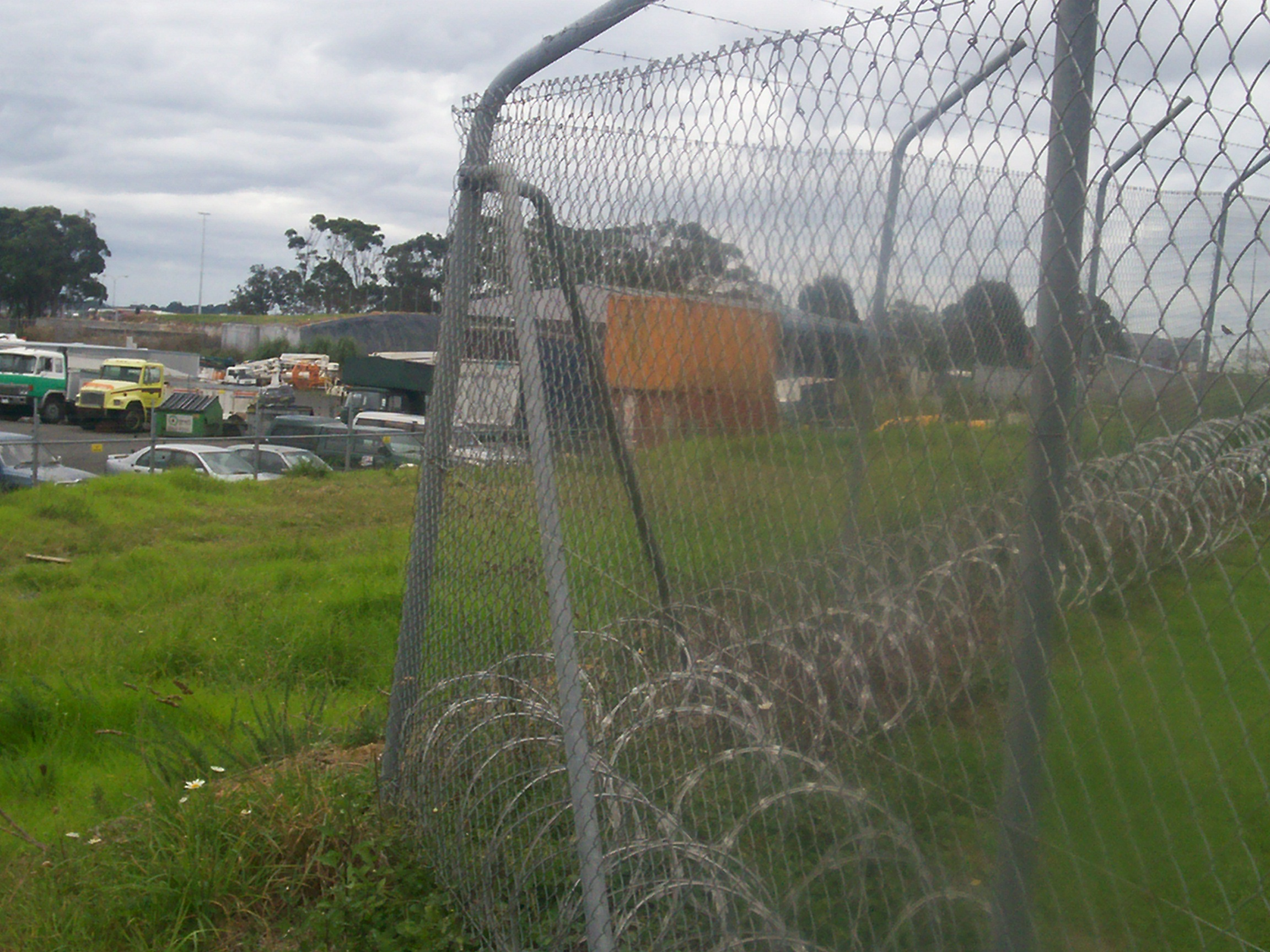
A view across present day Ash Hill.

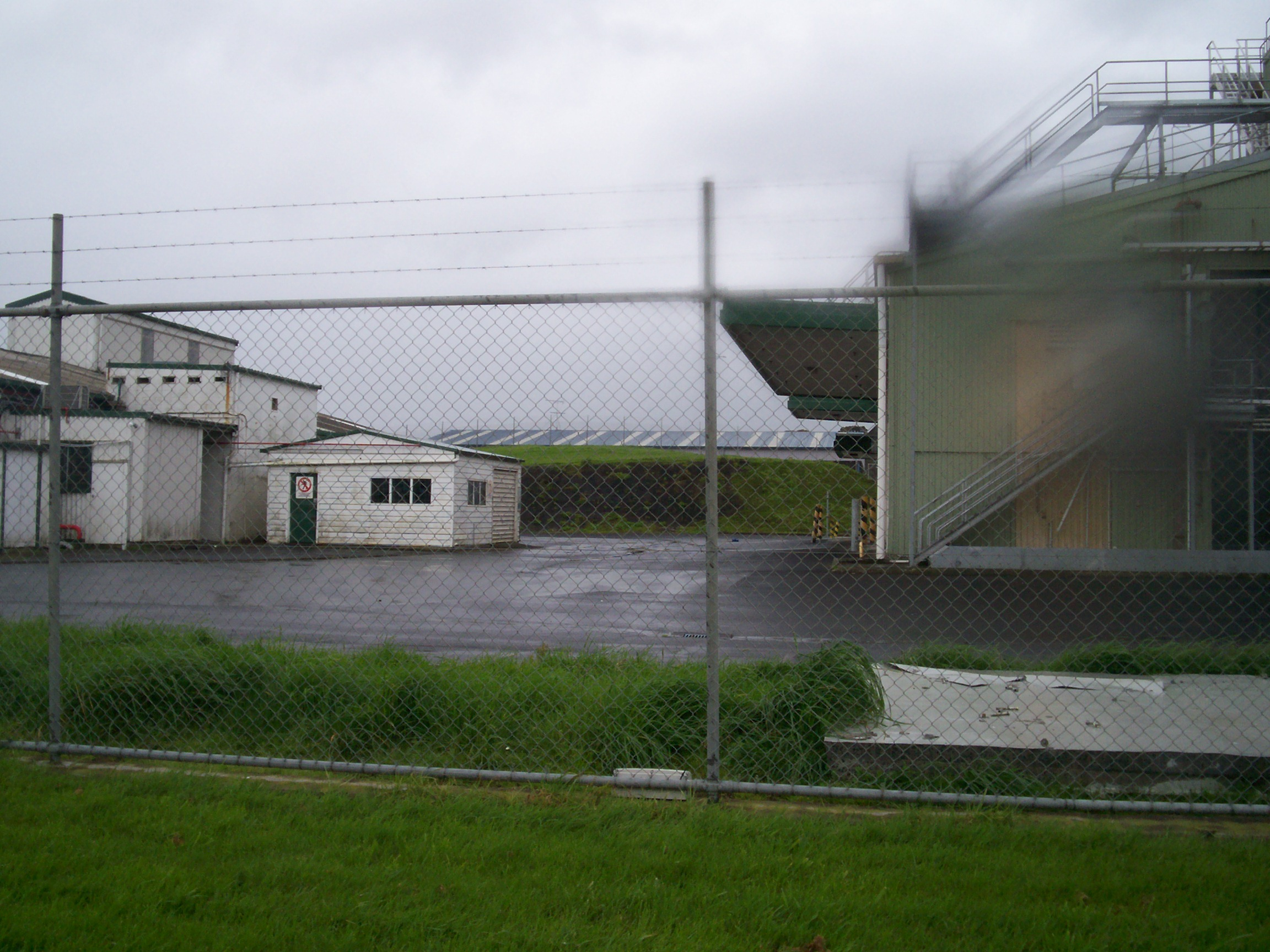
A view of part of Ash Hill before obscuring buildings were removed.
