= Te Taoū =

- Iwi (tribe) in Māoridom
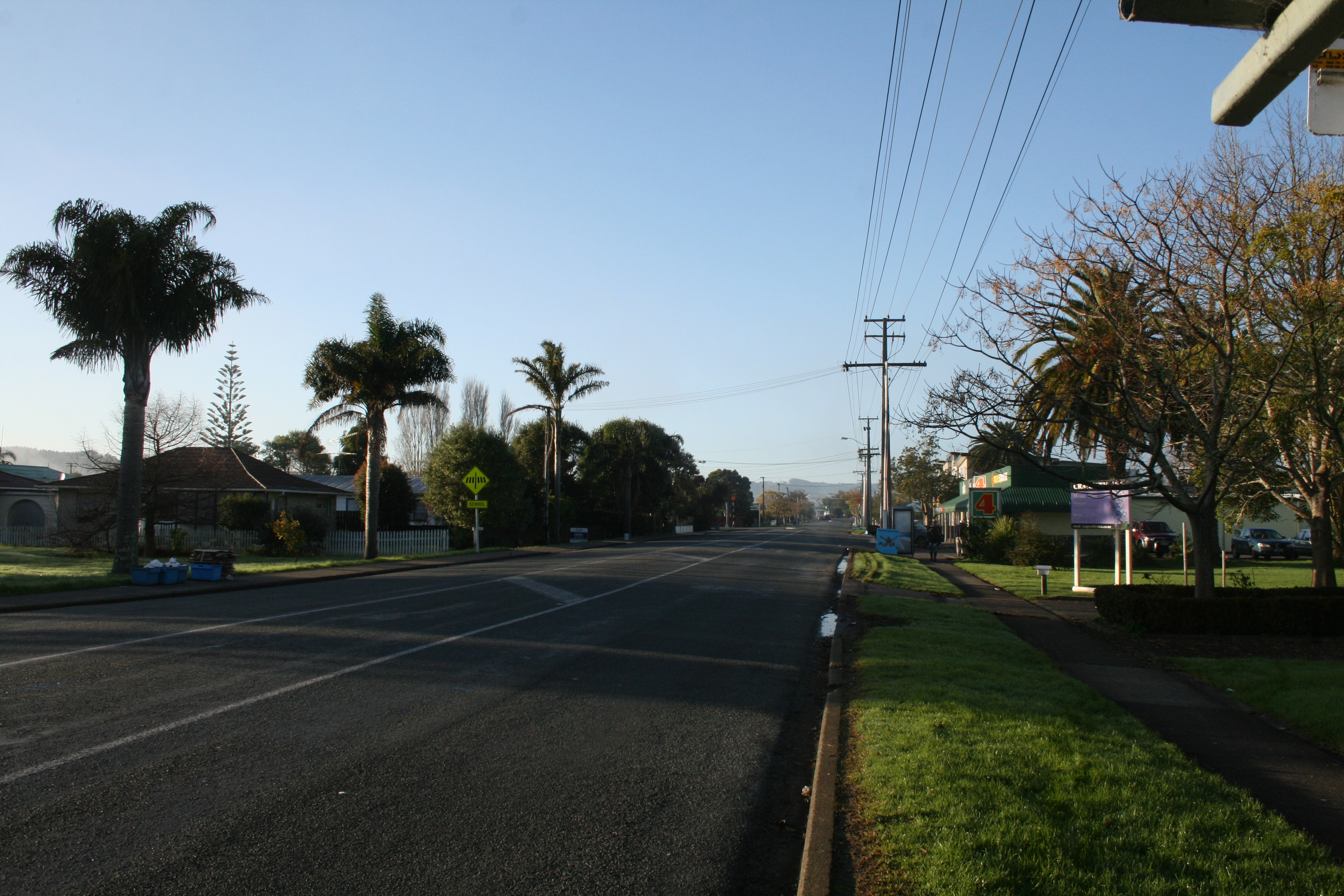
- Parakai

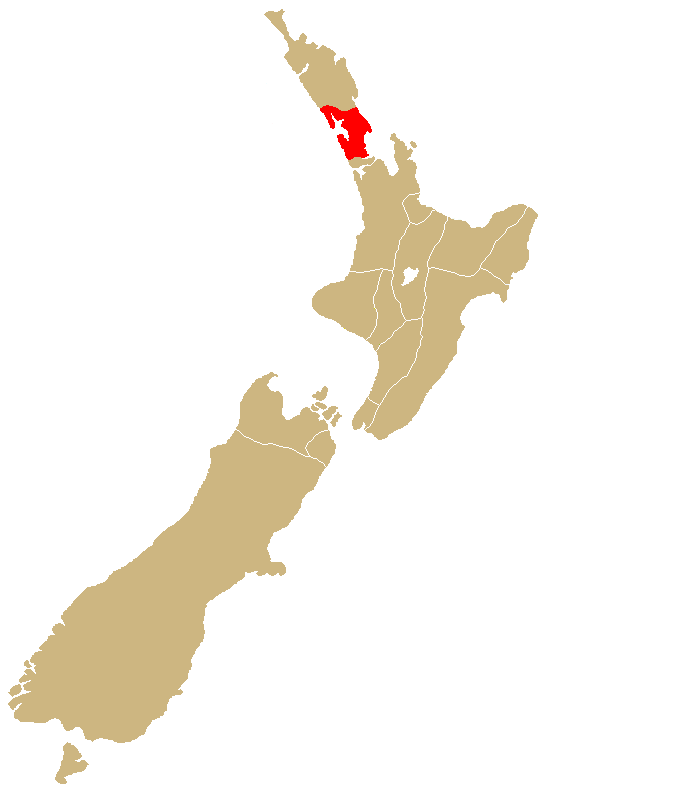
- Rohe (region): Northland and Auckland
- Waka (canoe): Māhuhu-ki-te-rangi

Te Taoū is a Māori iwi (tribe) of Northland and the Auckland Region in New Zealand. Together with Te Uri-o-Hau, Te Roroa and Ngāti Whātua-o-Ōrākei, it comprises the iwi (tribe) of Ngāti Whātua. The four iwi can act together or separately as independent tribes. Te Taoū has been considered to be a hapū (subtribe) of Ngāti Whātua in the past, but this is disputed. Te Taoū have attempted to separate from Ngāti Whātua in Treaty of Waitangi settlement negotiations, claiming that Ngāti Whātua do not represent them and being kept under Ngāti Whātua will cause a loss of sovereignty and mana.
