= Te Motunui Epa =

2022 book by Rachel Buchanan

- Author: Rachel Buchanan
- Language: English
- Subject: Te Motunui Epa, cultural restitution
- Genre: Non-fiction
- Publisher: Bridget Williams Books
- Publication date: 2022
- Awards: Ernest Scott Prize; Keri Hulme Award (nominated)
- ISBN: 978-1-990046-58-2

Te Motunui Epa is a 2022 book by Te Atiawa historian and archivist Rachel Buchanan. The book describes the history and travels of five carved wooden panels from Motunui, which involved a landmark case for cultural restitution. The book was shortlisted for the Keri Hulme Award in 2023, shared the 2023 Ernest Scott Prize, and was listed in Books of Mana as one of the 180 most important works of Māori-authored non-fiction.

== Content ==
The book tells the story of five carved wooden panels, known as the Motunui or Motonui epa. Forming the back wall of a pataka or storehouse, they were crafted by Te Āti Awa artisans between 1750 and 1820. During tribal warfare, the panels were buried in a swamp near Motunui for safekeeping. Rediscovered in 1971 by ditch-diggers, they were sold through a dealer to George Ortiz, a wealthy Bolivian collector living in Switzerland, for US$65,000. The dealer took them out of New Zealand, violating laws on the export of national treasures. In 1978, Ortiz attempted to sell them at Sotheby's with a fake history to recoup a ransom he had paid for his kidnapped daughter. After legal challenges through the British courts failed, and Ortiz's death in 2013, the New Zealand government paid $4.6 million to Ortiz's family to have them returned. From 2015 they have been displayed in the New Plymouth museum and public library, Puke Ariki, under a guardianship arrangement agreed to by the Crown, Te Āti Awa, and Ngāti Rahiri.

== Reception ==
In the book, Buchanan imagines how the panels would respond to these events, giving them voices to allow them speak directly to the reader. One reviewer found this perspective sometimes forced, while Liana MacDonald says "A focus on human and non-human interactions gives us a more expansive, relational, and resilient view of our own difficult and complex histories than conventional historiography".

Buchanan acknowledged that her history starts with the rediscovery of the panels in the 1970s, and that she felt ashamed she was unable to discover their previous history or who is represented in the panels.

== Recognition ==
In her review of the book, Liana Macdonald described the book as "a detailed examination of how the law has evolved in relation to cultural property". Jonathan Barrett, a law academic, had "minor quibbles" with the lack of an index and occasional overwrought language, but described the book as a taonga (treasure). Academic Melissa Shiress called the book "a timely addition to the literature on the restitution of cultural heritage".

The book was shortlisted for the Māori Literature Trust's 2023 Keri Hulme Award, and also shortlisted for the award for illustrated non-fiction at the 2023 Ockham New Zealand Book Awards. Te Motunui Epa jointly won the Ernest Scott Prize at the 2023 Australian History Awards. The judges said "this book demonstrates a deep engagement with a Te Ao Māori worldview and challenges orthodox views of perspective, voice and the narrative form itself. This book is an exemplar of modern history writing in Aotearoa New Zealand; it is also elegant and sophisticated and a cracking good read."

In 2025 Te Motunui Epa was listed in Books of Mana as one of the 180 most significant works of Māori-authored non-fiction.
