= Ihumātao =

Archaeological site in Auckland, New Zealand

Coordinates: 36°59′10″S 174°45′15″E

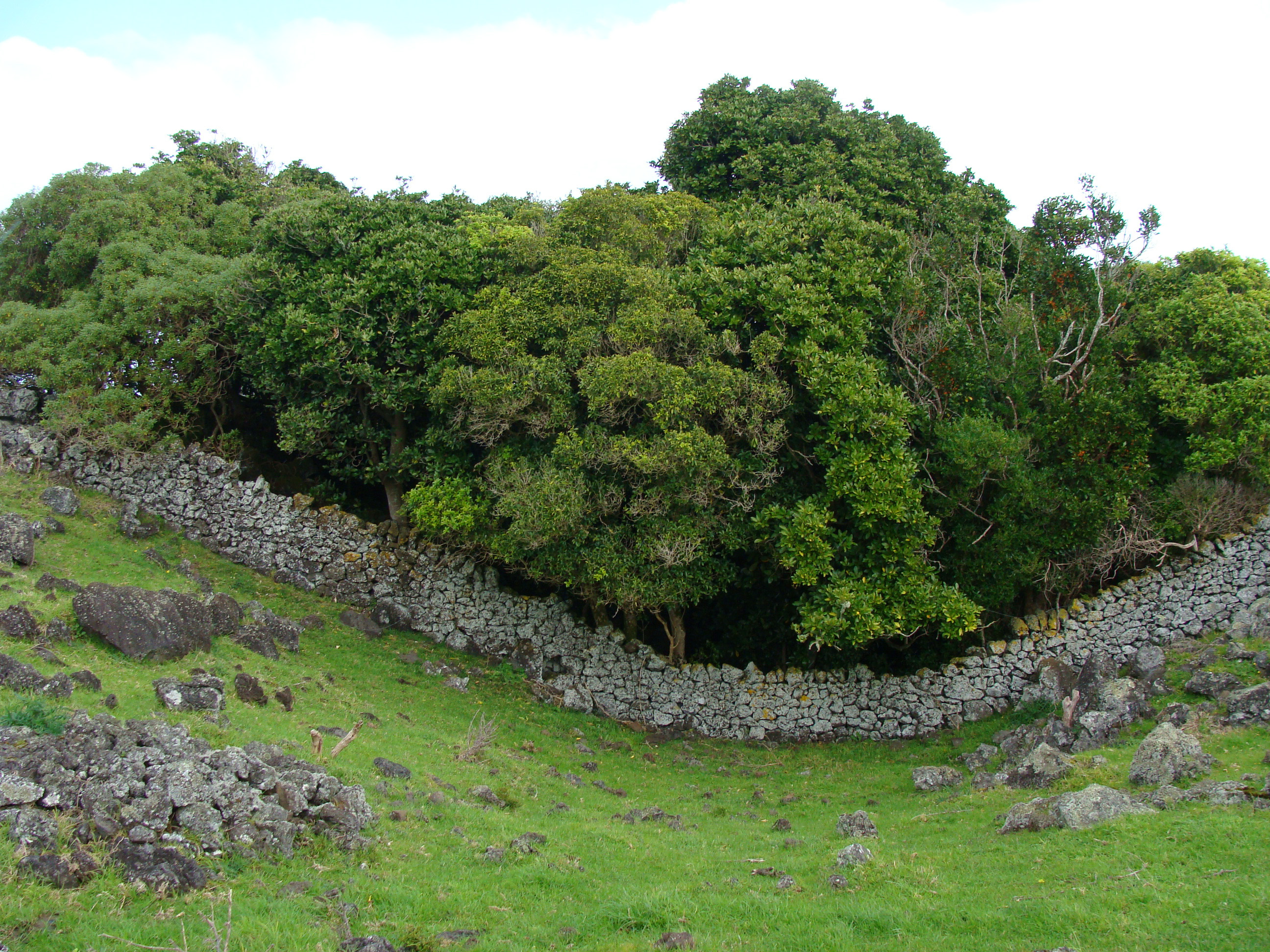
Forest remnant and drystone wall on Ōtuataua volcano's lava field, Auckland, New Zealand

Ihumātao is an archaeological site of historic importance in the suburb of Māngere, Auckland. Once a pā site, it stands on the Ihumātao Peninsula, at the base of Ōtuataua, part of the Auckland volcanic field. Its scoria cone reaches 64 metres (210 ft) above sea level.

Māori first settled in the area as early as the 14th century CE. During the Invasion of the Waikato in 1863, the local Māori had their land confiscated by the New Zealand government as punishment for supporting the Kīngitanga movement. The name Ihumātao translates as "cold nose".

The land was largely used for farming until late 2016 when the construction-management company Fletcher Building acquired the site as part of a housing-development project. A group of local activists, led by Pania Newton, opposed the development of the site and staged protests and an occupation of the land over the next three years. In December 2021, the site was purchased by the government with the proposal that it be used for housing purposes. As of June 2024 a steering committee is developing a plan for the future use of the land.

== History ==
=== Māori settlement ===
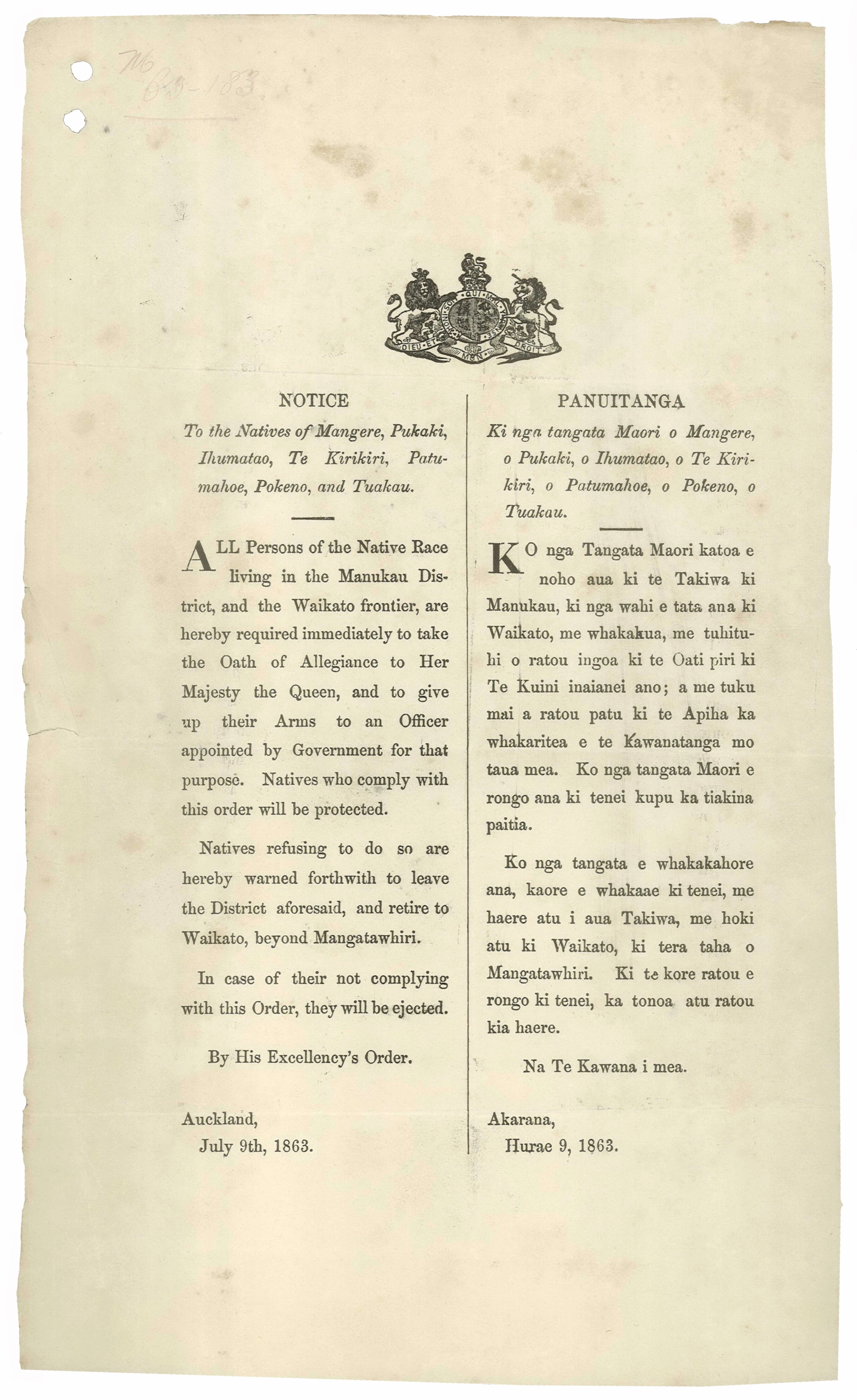
Proclamation requiring Māori to take an Oath of Allegiance, 9 July 1863

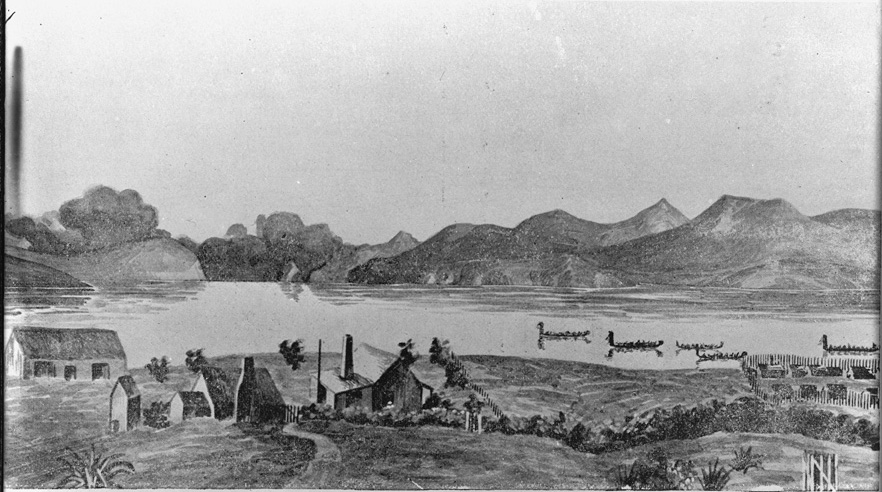
The Wesleyan Mission Station at Ihumātao, near Maungataketake (1855)

The Ōtuataua Stonefields are part of an area known as Ihumātao or Te Ihu a Mataoho ("The Nose of Mataoho"). The Stonefields feature Māori stone garden mounds and Māori and European dry-stone walls; the visible histories of Ihumātao are interwoven with the history of Auckland, as it is possible to trace the history of human presence in Auckland from initial Māori settlement to the arrival of Europeans in the 1860s with their pastoral farming techniques.

The coastline of Māngere, Ihumātao and Pukaki Creek was first settled by Māori as early as the 14th century AD/CE. According to traditions the first settlers were the Ngā Oho people. In the early 17th century, the area was within the rohe of Te Kawerau ā Maki, and by the mid-17th century was a part of Waiohua, a confederation of Ngā Oho and other Tāmaki Māori tribes. The papakāinga (village) of Ihumātao is considered the oldest settlement in Auckland.

The Ōtuataua Stonefields were part of a greater settlement of the Auckland isthmus, which has been surveyed, mapped and investigated by archaeologists since the 1970s. It is estimated that there was once about 8,000 hectares of stonefield gardens, of which the 100 hectares at Ōtuataua is the last remaining example. Other South Auckland stonefield garden sites included Wiri, where there were 300 hectares of prehistoric agricultural activity involving about 120 hectares of arable land growing kūmara, taro and gourds, and Matukutūreia (McLaughlins Mountain) which has been destroyed by quarrying.

The Ōtuataua Stonefields were created during the 15th century, using Polynesian agricultural techniques and traditions. The stonefields acted as boundary walls, windbreaks and drainage systems for the crops grown in the area, which included kūmara (sweet potato), hue (calabash gourds), taro, uwhi (ube yam), tī pore (Pacific cabbage tree) and aute (the paper mulberry tree). The environment-modifying techniques used in the Ōtuataua Stonefields allowed early Tāmaki Māori to propagate crops which were not suited to a cooler climate.

During the 17th and early 18th centuries, the area was farmed for the Waiohua peoples. After the defeat of Waiohua paramount chief Kiwi Tāmaki circa 1740 AD/CE, many Waiohua people fled the region. When the Waiohua people began to re-establish themselves in the Tāmaki Makaurau area in the later 18th century, most settled around the Manukau Harbour and South Auckland.

At the time of European colonisation, Ihumātao had continued be occupied by Waiohua-descendent peoples Ngāti Tamaoho, Te Ākitai Waiohua and Ngāti Te Ata, who lived in a disbursed circuit around the Manukau Harbour, as opposed to continuously occupied villages. The arrival of European settlers in the area significantly altered the Ōtuataua Stonefields, which were altered to contain animals. Ihumātao provided food for the growing township of Auckland until the 1863, primarily corn, potato, kūmara, pigs and fruit. In 1845, hostilities broke out between Ngāti Tamaoho and Ngāti Te Ata over land boundaries on the Āwhitu Peninsula. A hui was convened at Ihumātao by Waikato Tainui chief (and future Māori King) Pōtatau Te Wherowhero, who facilitated a compromise between the iwi, and allowed members of Ngāti Tamaoho to settle at Ihumātao. In 1846, the Wesleyan Methodist Church established a mission at the foot of Maungataketake, near Ihumātao. In May 1857, thousands of Māori gathered at Ihumātao for the hahunga (exhumation of bones) of Ngāti Tamaoho rangatira Ēpiha Pūtini (also known as Te Rangitāhua Ngāmuka and Jabez Bunting) was held at Ihumātao. The hui involved many discussions between chiefs on how they believed the New Zealand Crown had failed them, and was one of the integral hui that led to the birth of the Māori King Movement in 1858.

=== Crown acquisition and land contestation ===
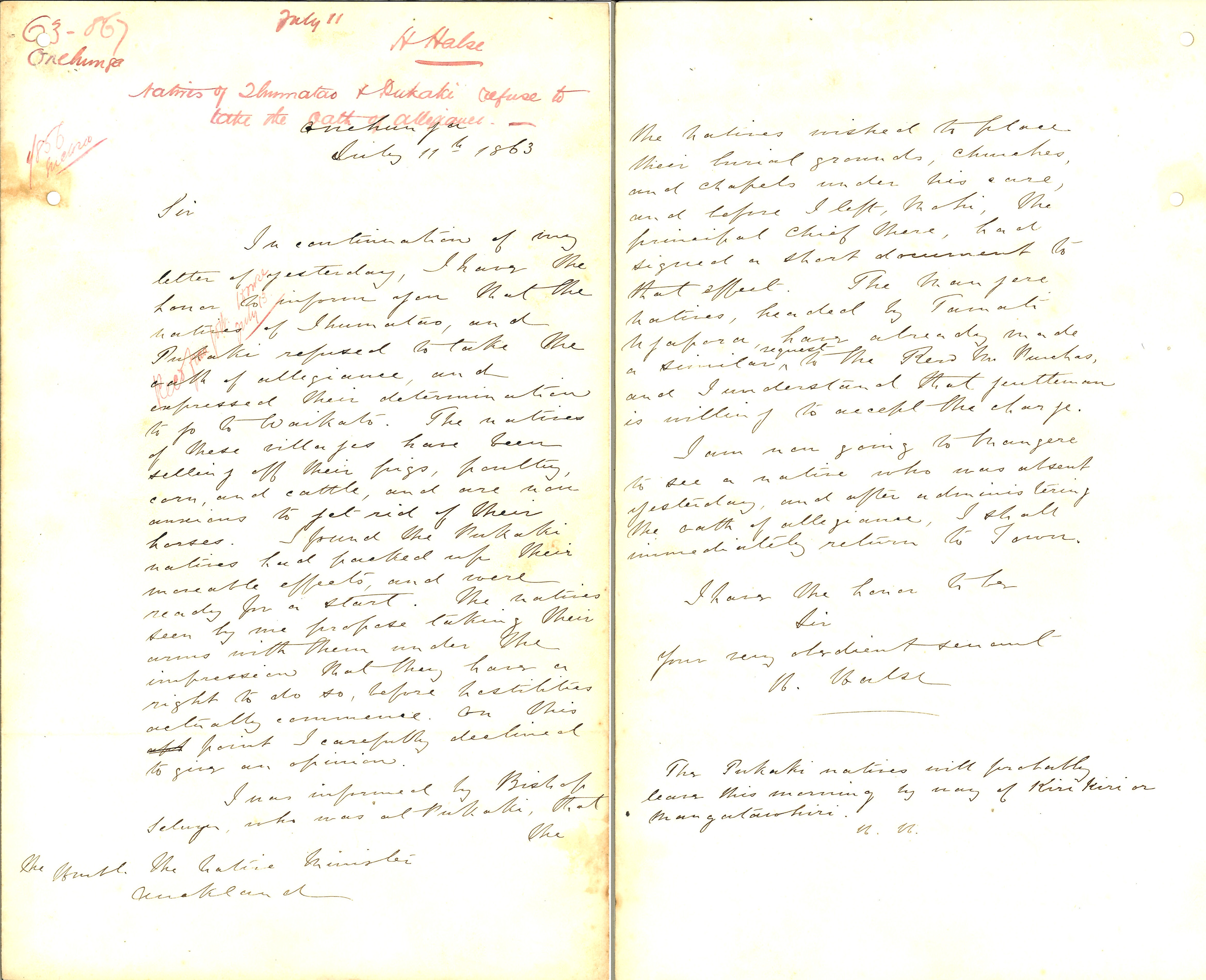
Māori of Ihumātao and Pukaki refuse to take the oath of allegiance, 11 July 1863

In 1863, due to fears of an imminent war with Waikato Tainui, Governor Grey ordered the eviction of all Māori occupants of the South Auckland and Manukau Harbour areas, who did not swear an oath to the Queen and give up arms. Most Māori occupants of the area felt they had no choice due to their strong ties to Tainui and Pōtatau Te Wherowhero, and were forced to flee to the south. Only a small number of occupants stayed, in order to maintain ahi kā (the fires of continuous occupation). While fleeing, Te Ākitai Waiohua rangatira Ihaka Takanini and his family were captured by his former neighbour, Lieutenant-Colonel Marmaduke Nixon, and taken prisoner on Rakino Island, where Ihaka Takanini died. The former residents of Ihumātao and the Manukau Harbour began returning to the area in 1866.

In 1867 the Crown gave the land to the Wallace family via Crown Grant. The Oruarangi Block was farmed by the Wallace family for 150 years. The Wallace family, and other British immigrant farmers, dismantled and rearranged the stonefields to better suit their uses of the land. The rocky terrain was unsuitable to European farming methods, and could not be plowed mechanically. Some of the first dairy farms in Auckland were established on the farms near Ihumātao. Members of Te Kawerau ā Maki, a tribe whose heartland is in the Waitākere Ranges, began living at Ihumātao in the late 20th century after being displaced from their traditional lands at Te Henga / Bethells Beach.

In the early 1980s, an archaeological survey of the stone structures of Ihumātao and the wider area was conducted. Many Māori archaeologists and historians highlighted significance of the area, and pressured the Manukau City Council to act to preserve the lands. In 2001, the Manukau City Council, the Department of Conservation, New Zealand Lotteries Commission and Auckland Regional Council purchased much of the stonefields area from four farming families, creating the Ōtuataua Stonefields Historic Reserve in 2001. The Manukau City Council attempted to preserve the adjacent land at Ihumātao as part of the reserve in 2009, however this was later overruled on appeal by the Environment Court.

In 2014, the New Zealand Government and Auckland Council designated 32 hectares adjacent to the Ōtuataua Stonefields Historic Reserve as a Special Housing Area (SHA). This was met by opposition by a Māori activist group led by University of Auckland law graduate Pania Newton called "Save Our Unique Landscape" (SOUL), who opposed the proposed development due to Ihumātao's historical significance. SOUL staged protests and erected a whare and pou whenua on Ihumātao Quarry Road.

In 2016, the "Wallace Block" on Ihumātao was sold to Fletcher Housing, a subsidiary of Fletcher Building, which has plans to build 480 houses on the land. Archaeologist Dave Veart has described the planned Fletcher development as "like building houses on the fields alongside Stonehenge." The Green Party announced its support for the preservation of Ihumātao in 2015.

=== Protest action and occupation ===
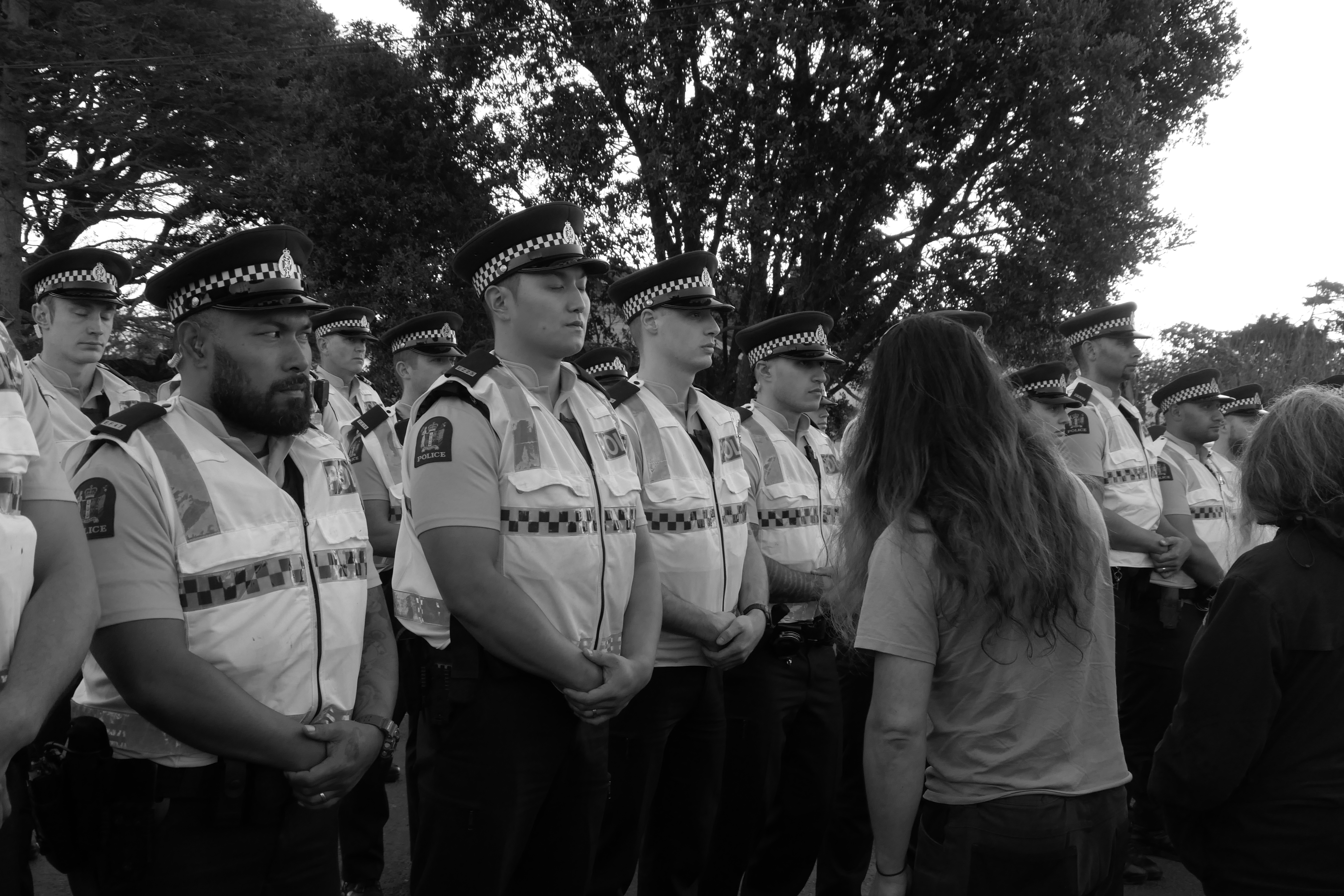
On 23 July 2019 Police moved in on people protesting the takeover of ancestral land by commercial company Fletchers, who are building a housing development there

In response to Fletcher Building's planned housing development on the Oruarangi Bloc, the protest group SOUL led by Pania Newton set up camp beside Ihumātao Quarry Road on 4 November 2016. This camp, which became known as Kaitiaki Village, numbered twenty individuals with participants sleeping in caravans, sheds, tents, and an empty boat. SOUL contended that the land was taken by proclamation during the Waikato War in 1863 and that its confiscation under the New Zealand Settlements Act 1863 breaches the Treaty of Waitangi.

In 2017, SOUL appealed to the United Nations, which recommended that the designation of Ihumātao as a Special Housing Area be reviewed by the Government to "evaluate its conformity with the Treaty of Waitangi, the UN Declaration on the Rights of Indigenous Peoples and other relevant international standards" and that "the free and informed consent of Māori is obtained before approving any project affecting the use and development of their traditional land and resources." In 2018, SOUL appealed to the Environment Court who declined to overturn the permission granted to Fletcher Building to build houses in Māngere.

In March 2019, SOUL and their supporters in Wellington submitted a petition to the New Zealand Parliament demanding government intervention to prevent a confrontation on Ihumātao. In April 2019, SOUL also delivered a 20,000 signature petition to the Mayor of Auckland Phil Goff, calling on Council and the government to protect the land.

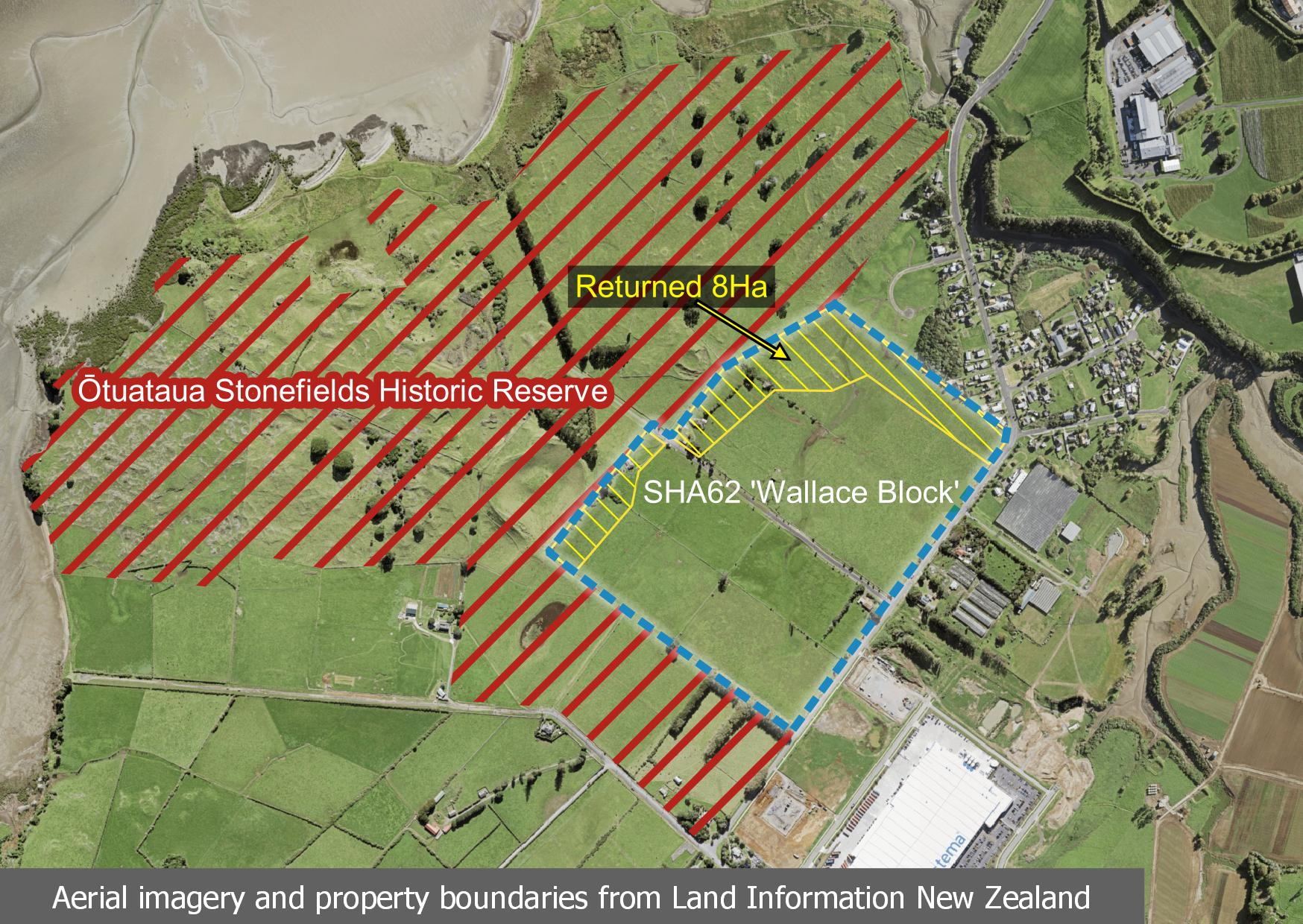
Ihumātao Peninsula with boundaries highlighting the historic reserve and housing development area

According to media reports, the Ihumātao housing development dispute was characterised by a generational divide within Te Kawerau ā Maki. While younger members of the tribe including Pania Newton and her cousins were opposed to the housing development and sought the return of Ihumātao to their iwi, tribal elders including Te Warena Taua supported the housing development and regarded Newton and her cousins' actions as disrespectful. The iwi's leadership body, the Te Kawerau Iwi Tribal Authority & Settlement Trust, supported the housing development, stating that they had negotiated an agreement with Fletcher and Makaurau Marae Māori Trust for the land to be returned to "mana whenua" (power associated with possession and occupation of tribal land). Fletcher Housing announced that they were committed to returning 25% of the land (roughly eight hectares) to the Kingitanga.

On 23 July 2019, SOUL were served an eviction notice in the Oruarangi Block, and five people were subsequently arrested. Another person was arrested after climbing on a vehicle to prevent it entering the blockaded area. On 25 July Amnesty International sent human rights observers to the site to document the human rights situation and ensure the rights of protestors were respected. Solidarity protests were held outside Parliament in Wellington on 24 July and Dunedin on 26 July. Green Party co-leader Marama Davidson and MPs Chlöe Swarbrick and Golriz Ghahraman supported the protestors, but Prime Minister Jacinda Ardern said the government would not intervene. On 25 July 2019, seven supporters of the occupation were arrested after blocking traffic on a road leading out of Auckland Airport to call attention to the situation at Ihumātao.

=== Crown intervention and mediation ===
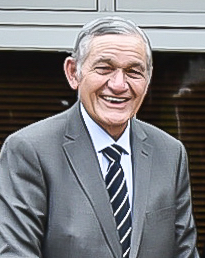
The leader of the Kīngitanga, Kīngi Tūheitia, called for the return of Ihumātao to mana whenua in 2019

On 26 July 2019, Ardern backtracked on her earlier announcement and announced that no further building would take place at Ihumātao while the Government and other parties negotiated a peaceful solution to the dispute.

On 3 August 2019, Kīngi Tūheitia, the Māori King, visited Ihumātao with a contingent of over 400 and listened to mana whenua and supporters. Views and history were shared, and an account was given of Pōtatau Te Wherowhero, first leader of the Kīngitanga, receiving his title at Ihumātao. A Kīngitanga flag was also raised to fly until a resolution is reached. Just hours after Tūheitia's visit, footage of two armed police officers carrying rifles around Ihumātao caused considerable alarm to protestors and supporters, and led to calls for guns to be removed from the site.

On 4 August 2019, SOUL protestors and supporters held a hīkoi to Pukeiti/Puketapapakanga a Hape and back to the camp site through the fenced-off area of Kaitiaki Village, the site of SOUL's original occupation. At the same time, protestors pushed the police's frontline about 50 metres down Ihumātao Quarry Road from its original location at the intersection with Oruarangi Road, and moved tents into fields that had previously been blocked off by police. As the hikoi passed through Kaitiaki Village, Organise Aotearoa members who had joined the occupation spoke with First Security workers hired by Fletcher Building, discovering – and later publicising – that for two weeks, the security guards, mostly recent migrants and students, had been sleeping in a milking station with broken windows on scavenged mattresses from Kaitiaki Village, where temperatures regularly drop below 5 °C (41 °F) at night, without access to electricity, safe drinking water, or the meals they had been promised by First Security.

On the night of 5 August 2019, there were reports of clashes between protesters and the police. Protesters accused the police of using kettling tactics and unreasonable force while the police claimed that protesters had attempted to breach the cordon around the disputed land. The next day, SOUL protesters and supporters staged a protest outside the Fletcher Building headquarters in Penrose in Auckland, as part of a national day of action that had been planned before the clashes of the previous night took place. Similar protests were held in Whangarei, Hamilton, Hastings, Palmerston North, Wellington, Christchurch, and Dunedin.

In early August 2019, Opposition Leader Simon Bridges called on the protesters to "return home" and criticised Ardern for halting construction. Earlier, Mana Movement leader and Māori activist Hone Harawira denounced the police as "pigs" in a Facebook post. In response to Bridges' remarks, Ardern reiterated the Government's commitment to finding a solution to the Ihumātao dispute. On 22 August, about 150 protesters marched from Ihumātao to Ardern's electorate office in Mount Albert calling on her to visit the site. On the same day, a group of students including Youth MPs were expelled from Parliament for a year after disrupting parliamentary proceedings by singing the Māori song "Tutira Mai Nga Iwi" while holding up the Tino Rangatiratanga flag to draw attention to the hikoi.

On 18 September 2019, the leader of the Kīngitanga Tūheitia Paki announced that mana whenua wanted the return of the land. He called on the Government to negotiate with Fletchers for the return of the land to its rightful owners. The Māori Party also issued press release supporting the mana whenua of Ihumātao and calling on Ardern and the Crown to reach a solution with the mana whenua. In response to media coverage, deputy prime minister Winston Peters claimed that the SOUL protesters had little authority among the Māori community. On 19 September, National MP Andrew Bayly was ejected from Parliament for attempting to disrupt Parliamentary proceedings by asking several questions about the implications of the Ihumātao dispute for treaty settlements nationally. In mid September 2019, then-acting prime minister Winston Peters stated that Finance Minister Grant Robertson had entered into meaningful discussions with Fletcher on how to deal with the disputed land. In mid October, members of the SOUL group complained that they had been left out of talks between Fletcher and the Government.

In early November 2019, the Crown heritage entity Heritage New Zealand announced that it was considering raising the heritage status of the Ōtuataua Stonefields reserve and the Ihumātao reserve to Category 1, the highest category ranking. Heritage NZ however stated that they would not change the consent for Fletcher Housing development. In mid November, it was reported the Government was considering loaning the Auckland Council NZ$40 million to purchase the Ihumātao land from Fletcher Building. This announcement was met by criticism from elements of the Māori community, who reiterated their calls for the return of Ihumātao. In late November 2019, Fletcher Housing chair Bruce Hassall defended the company's handling of the Ihumātao dispute, claiming that the company had bought the land in good faith, consulted with iwi groups, and followed proper land procedures.

On 21 January 2020, Pania Newton, the leader of the SOUL group, issued a statement to the media that they were close to completing a deal on the disputed land at Ihumātao. Fletcher Building also stated that discussions on the future of the site were "progressing." Fletcher also removed fencing and restored a road to the maunga. On 23 June, Radio New Zealand reported that the Government was considering making a decision to purchase Ihumātao under the Housing Act.

== Crown ownership ==
On 17 December 2020, the Government reached a deal with Fletcher Building to buy the disputed Ihumātao land for NZ$30 million with the proposal that it be used for housing purposes. A steering committee consisting of the ahi kā (the occupiers), a Kīngitanga representative, and two representatives of the Crown would decide its use, with Auckland Council acting in an observer role.

On 20 April 2021, the Auditor General ruled that the Government's purchase of Ihumātao was unlawful since the Government did not seek the right approval for using the $29.9 million. The Auditor-General had investigated the purchase after receiving complaints from the National and ACT parties that the Government had used money from the Land for Housing Fund to purchase Ihumātao against Treasury advice. In order to validate the purchase, the Government would have to pass legislation legitimising the purchase of Ihumātao land. The Government said that this was a "technical error" that would be validated in the next Budget, which was due to be announced the following month.

In July 2022, The New Zealand Herald reported that a decision on the future of the land could be up to five years away. In May 2026, the Minister for Māori Development said that no decisions had been made and that the steering committee continued to be "engaged and in discussion with me about the way forward".

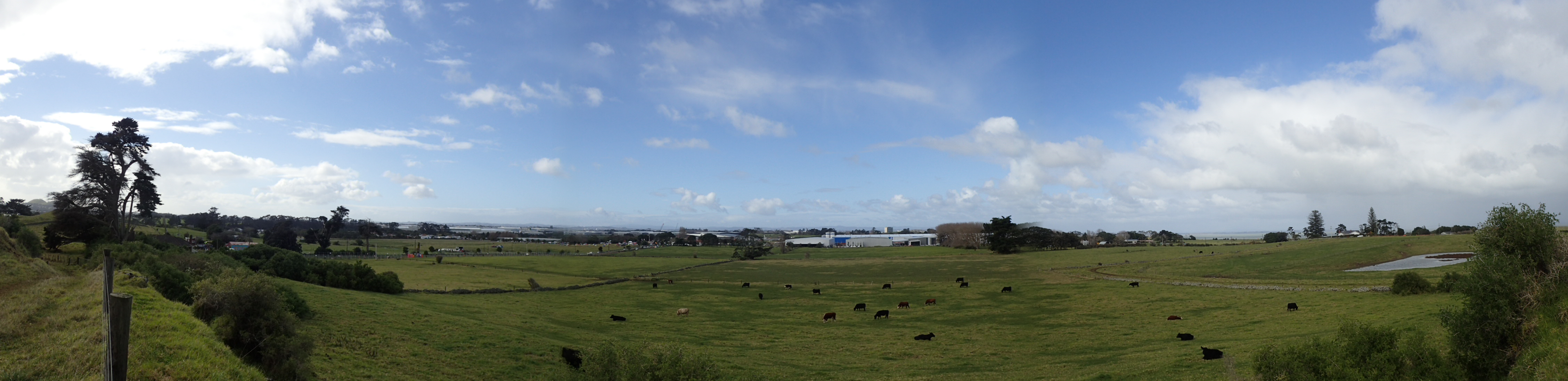
Ihumātao protest site: The land in the photo is the subject of the protest. The protest campsite is in the distance and centre.

== Ōtuataua ==
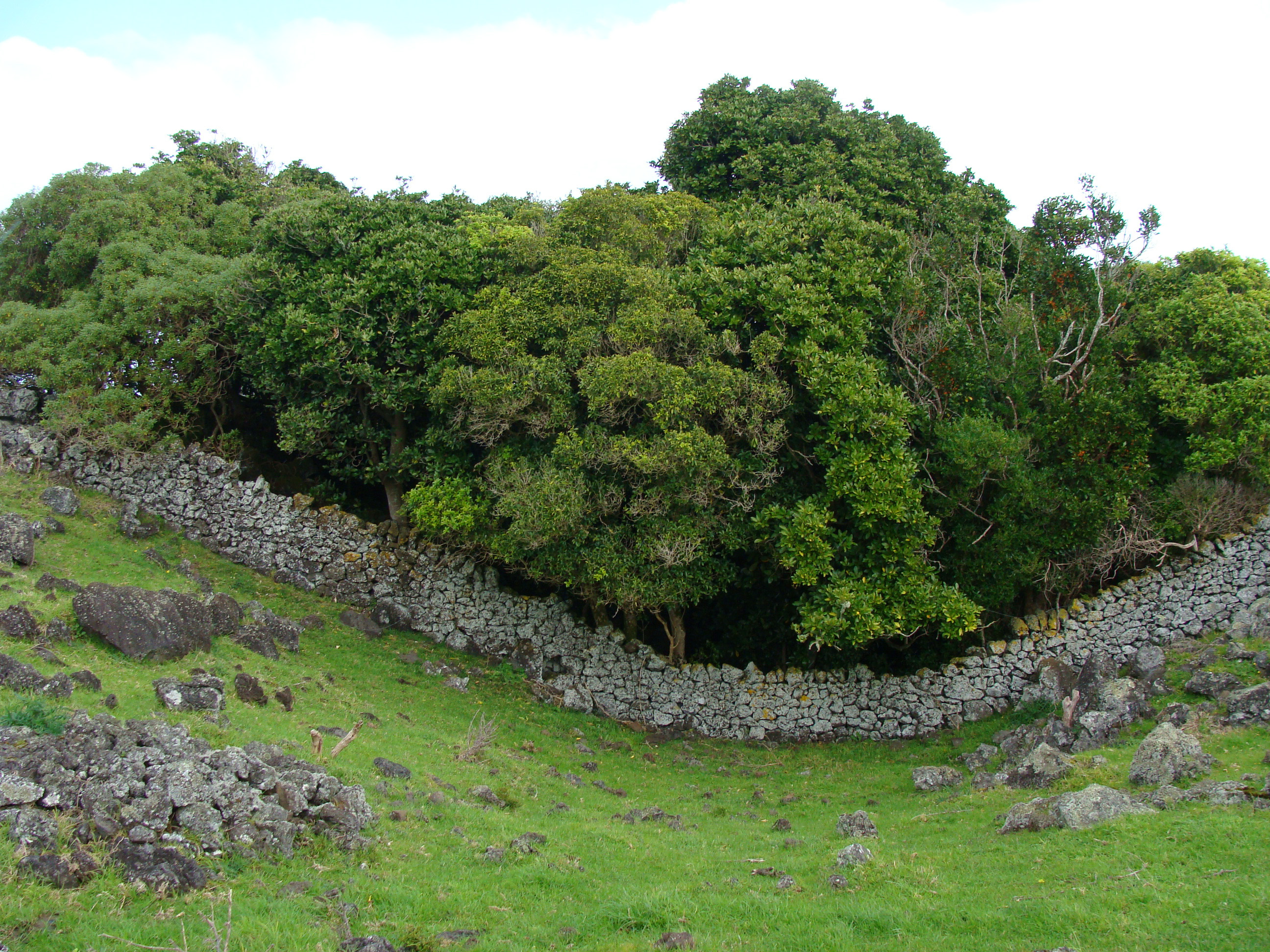
Forest remnant and dry-stone wall on Ōtuataua's lava field

The volcanic cone of Ōtuataua is sited within the Ōtuataua Stonefields Historic Reserve and as the dominant landscape feature, lends the 100 hectare reserve its name. The cone provided a fortified village to the original inhabitants, with the lower slopes of the volcano supporting intensive Māori gardening.

The volcanic soils extend to the shoreline where there was access to the abundance of the Manukau Harbour. The sandy beaches and wide tidal flats were once rich with shellfish and the harbour provided fish and a regionally important shark fishery.

The Ōtuataua cone was quarried in the 1950s, and the scoria used for building work – including the building of Auckland Airport. At the completion of quarrying, remedial reconstruction created a shallow, grassy crater.

Adjacent to Ōtuataua in the Ōtuataua Stonefields Historic Reserve lies Pukeiti (literally "small hill"), Auckland's smallest volcano.

== See also ==
- Māori protest movement
- Bastion Point
