= Pukaki Creek =

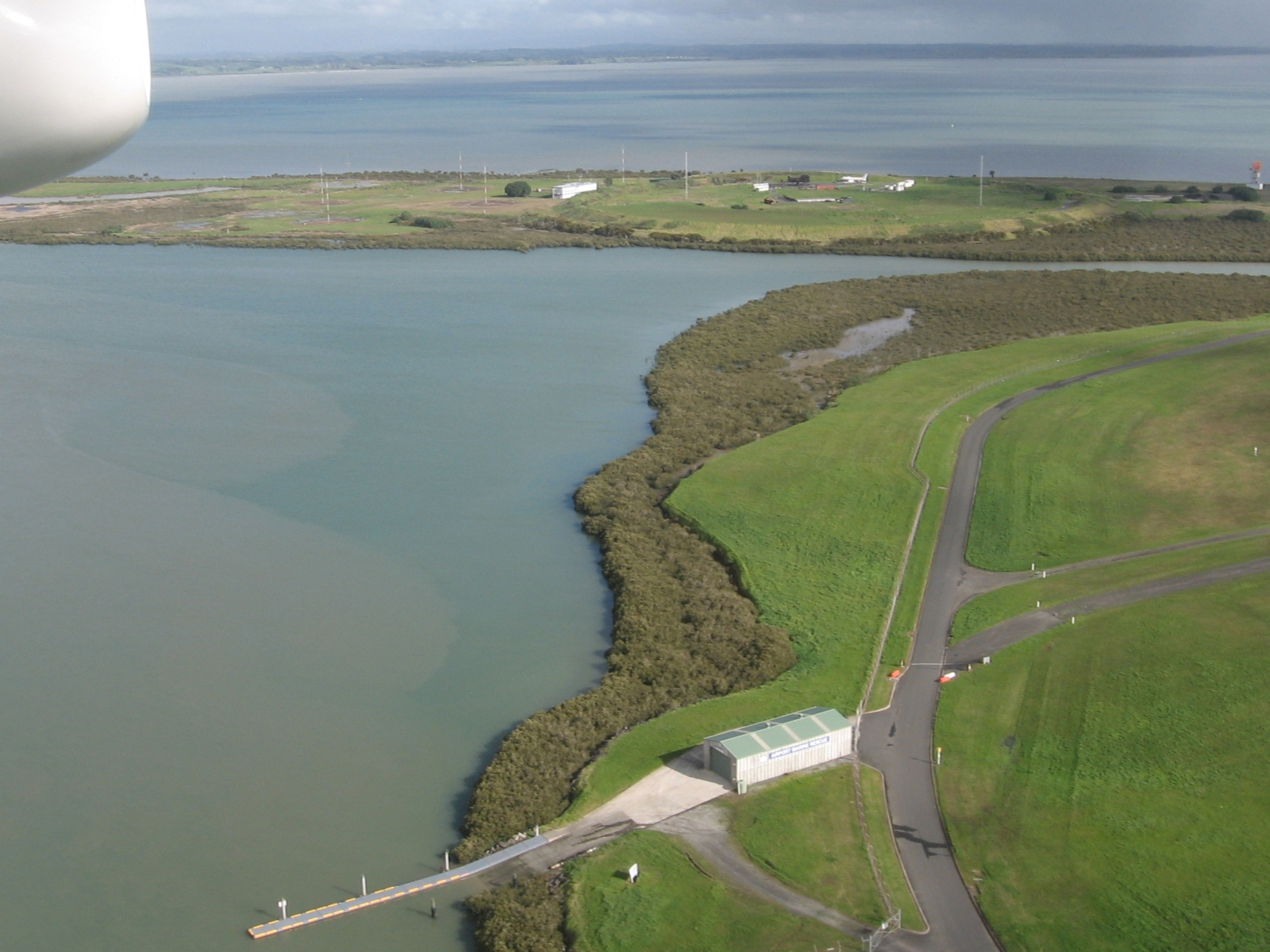
- The mouth of Pukaki Creek and Wiroa Island

- Mouth of Pukaki Creek Pukaki Creek (New Zealand)
- Route of Pukaki Creek

Location
- Country: New Zealand
- Region: Auckland Region

Physical characteristics
- Source
  - location: Māngere
  - coordinates: 36.97938°S 174.79841°E
- Mouth: Manukau Harbour
  - coordinates: 37.01036°S 174.81234°E

Basin features
- Progression: Pukaki Creek → Manukau Harbour → Tasman Sea
- Landmarks: Crater Hill, Pukaki Lagoon, Wiroa Island
- Tributaries
  - left: Waokauri Creek, Otaimako Creek
  - right: Tautauroa Creek
- Bridges: Pukaki Bridge

Pukaki Creek is an estuarine river of the Auckland Region of New Zealand's North Island. It flows south from its sources in Māngere and Papatoetoe, entering into the Manukau Harbour. The creek is adjacent to Auckland Airport and Pūkaki Marae.

== Geography ==
Pukaki Creek is fed by various waterways in South Auckland, including the Tautauroa Creek, the Waokauri Creek (also known as the Waiokauri Creek) and the Otaimako Creek. Adjacent to the creek is the volcanic Pukaki Lagoon. At the mouth of Pukaki Creek is Wiroa Island, which is connected to the Auckland Airport complex by road.

== History ==
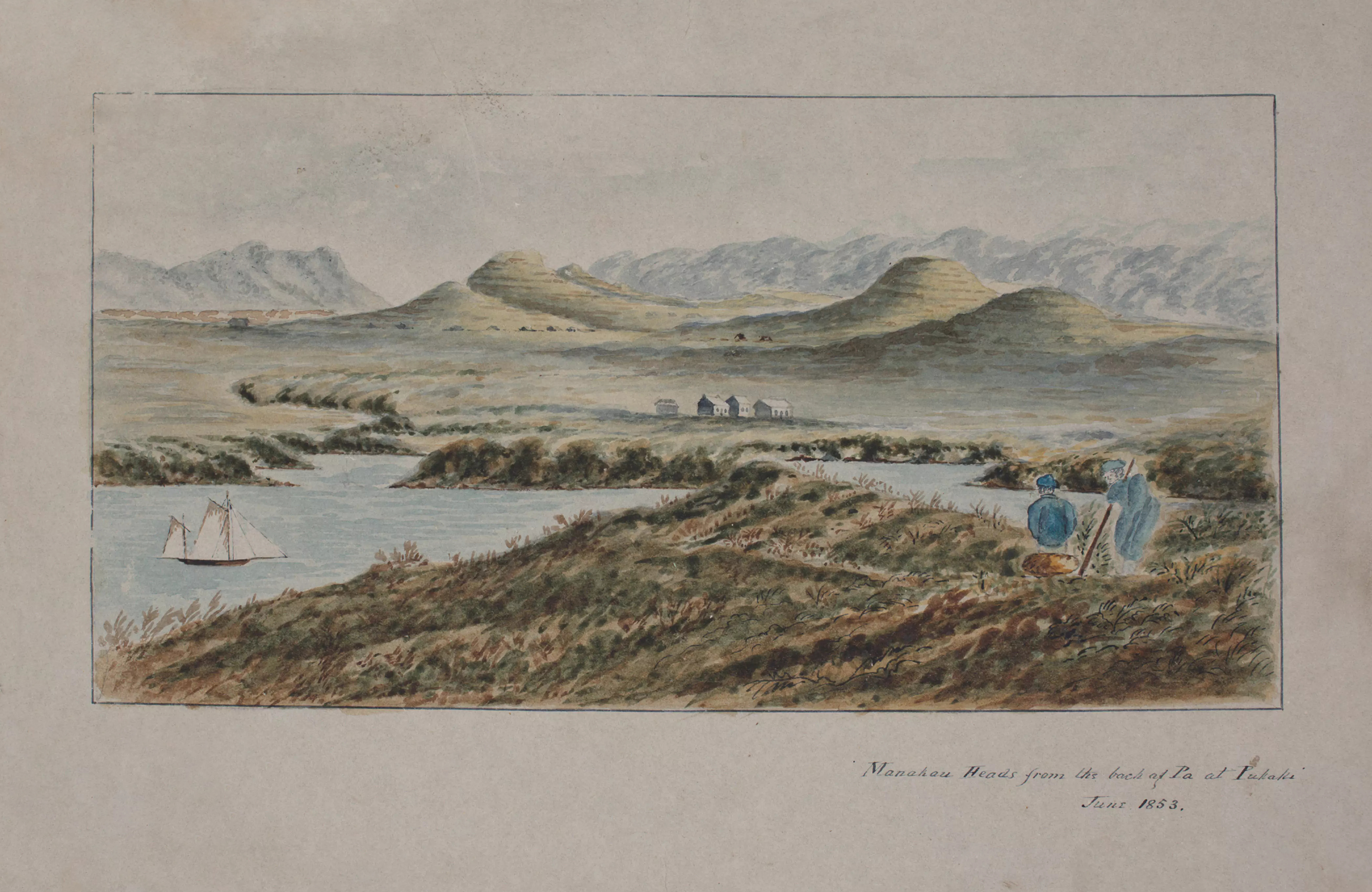
Pukaki Creek in an 1853 watercolour, showing Maungataketake, Ōtuataua and likely the farm of Marmaduke Nixon

Tāmaki Māori peoples were present along the Māngere-Ihumātao-Pūkaki coastline from at least 1450, establishing settlements later in the 15th century. The creek formed an important part of the Waokauri / Pūkaki portage, connecting the Manukau Harbour and Tāmaki River via Papatoetoe, and was often used by Tāmaki Māori to avoid the Te Tō Waka and Karetu portages, controlled by the people who lived at Ōtāhuhu / Mount Richmond. The creek formed a part of what was known as Ngā Tapuwae a Mataoho ("The Sacred Footprints of Mataoho"), referring to the volcano God who was said to have created the Auckland volcanic field.

During the Waiohua confederation era of the 17th and 18th centuries, the area was farmed. After the defeat of Waiohua paramount chief Kiwi Tāmaki circa 1740, many Waiohua people fled the region. When the Waiohua people began to re-establish themselves in the Tāmaki Makaurau area in the later 18th century, most settled around the Manukau Harbour and South Auckland. Those who settled along Pukaki Creek became known as Te Ākitai Waiohua.

In the 1850s, Lieutenant-Colonel Marmaduke Nixon lived on the western shores of Pukaki Creek, while Te Ākitai Waiohua lived on the eastern shores. In 1863 immediately prior to the Invasion of the Waikato, Te Ākitai Waiohua and other iwi in the South Auckland area were made to evict the area, or swear fealty to the New Zealand Government. Nixon arrested his neighbour, the Te Ākitai Waiohua rangatira Īhaka Takaanini, who later died on Rākino Island. Following the war and land confiscations, much of the land adjacent to Pukaki Creek was sold to British immigrant farmers. Te Ākitai Waiohua began returning to the area in 1866, settling to the west of Pukaki Creek and at Ihumātao. In the 1890s, Te Ākitai Waiohua built a marae on the land, which was used until the 1950s, when the Auckland International Airport was developed on the land.

In the 1950s, the area adjacent to Pukaki Creek became market gardens, run by Chinese New Zealand gardeners Fay Gock and Joe Gock. The Gocks began to cultivate kūmara (sweet potatoes), using plant donated to them by their neighbours at Pūkaki Marae. In the 1950s, the Gocks developed a disease-resistant variety of kūmara that became the modern Owairaka Red variety.

In 1993, Pukaki Creek became a Māori reservations under the Te Ture Whenua Māori Act 1993. Te Ākitai Waiohua's principal marae, Pūkaki Marae, opened in 2004, adjacent to Pukaki Creek.

== Panorama ==
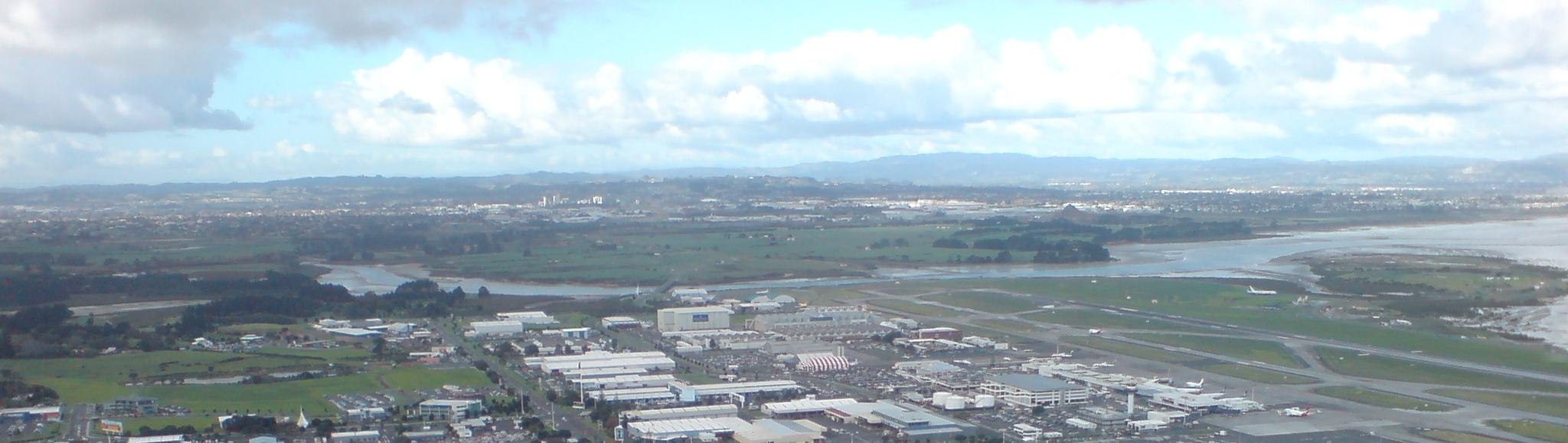
Pukaki Creek seen from an airplane. Auckland Airport is in the foreground, with South Auckland and the Hunua Ranges in the background.

== See also ==
- List of rivers of New Zealand
