= Rachel Buchanan =

New Zealand author, historian, curator

- Born: Rachel Anne Buchanan; 1968 (age 57–58); Whanganui, New Zealand
- Occupations: Author; historian; curator
- Children: 3
- Relatives: Bill English (uncle)

Academic background
- Education: Monash University (PhD)
- Thesis: Village of peace, village of war: Parihaka stories 1881–2004 (2005)

Academic work
- Notable works: Te Motunui Epa (2022)

Rachel Anne Buchanan (born 1968) is a New Zealand author, historian and curator. Based in Melbourne, she has written extensively on New Zealand Māori history, including notably her work Te Motunui Epa for which she was a joint recipient of the Ernest Scott Prize in 2023.

== Life and career ==
Buchanan was born in Whanganui in 1968, and is the daughter of paediatrician Leo Buchanan and his wife Mary English, the older sister of Bill English. She is part of the iwi (tribes) of Taranaki and Te Ātiawa. She graduated from Wellington Polytechnic with a diploma in journalism in 1985, and later earned her PhD in history from Monash University. Her PhD thesis about Parihaka was inspired by a 2000 exhibition at the City Gallery called "Parihaka: the Art of Passive Resistance". As of 2023 Buchanan is based in Melbourne. Her mentor is Mahara Okeroa, also of the Taranaki iwi.

Her historical writing includes The Parihaka Album: Lest We Forget (2009), Stop Press: The Last Days of Newspapers (2013) and Ko Taranaki te Maunga (2018). She has said she was inspired to write Ko Taranaki te Maunga, a history of the events at Parihaka interwoven with her own family history, by her late father, who had been the "keeper of memory and whakapapa" for her family. From 2015 to 2018 she was the curator of the Germaine Greer archives at the University of Melbourne.

Buchanan's illustrated historical work Te Motunui Epa was published in 2022 by Bridget Williams Books. It tells the story of five carved tōtara panels (whakairo) that were hidden by Te Ātiawa during 19th century wars, sold overseas in the 1970s and returned to New Zealand in 2014. As of 2023 they are displayed at Puke Ariki. The work was described by Te Ao Māori News as "a compelling illustrated narrative that draws on government documents recently made public to convey a tale of art, ancestry, and power". It was shortlisted for the award for illustrated non-fiction at the 2023 Ockham New Zealand Book Awards.

In 2023 Buchanan was the joint winner of the Ernest Scott Prize for Te Motunui Epa, together with historian Alan Atkinson. The award is for distinguished historical writing that contributes to the history of New Zealand or Australia, and the judges said of Buchanan's work:

This book is an exemplar of modern history writing in Aotearoa New Zealand; it is also elegant and sophisticated and a cracking good read.

In 2025, Te Motunui Epa was selected as one of the 180 most significant works of Māori-authored non-fiction through inclusion in Books of Mana.

== Selected works ==
- The Parihaka Album: Lest We Forget (Huia Publishers, 2009)
- Stop Press: The Last Days of Newspapers (Scribe, 2013)
- Ko Taranaki te Maunga (Bridget Williams Books, 2018)
- Te Motunui Epa (Bridget Williams Books, 2022)
