= Pukeiti =

Pukeiti may refer to:

== People ==
- Pukeiti Pukeiti (died 2012), Cook Islands politician

== Places ==
- Pukeiti (Auckland), one of the volcanoes in the Auckland Volcanic Field, New Zealand
- Pukeiti (gardens), a garden of international significance in Taranaki, New Zealand
