= Ngā-raurēkau =

Ngā-raurēkau, was a Māori man, possibly of the Te Āti Awa iwi (tribe) of New Zealand.

Ngā-raurēkau signed the Treaty of Waitangi on 16 May 1840 in Waikanae on the Kāpiti Coast.
