= Ahi kā =

Māori land right principle

Ahi kā or Ahi kaa (burning fires) is a principle in Māori culture, referring to take whenua (land rights) through visible occupation and use of land. Ahi kā is one of the traditional means to establish mana whenua (authority over land). Extensive continuous occupation is referred to as Ahi kā roa.

== History ==
Ahi kā is one of the major principles used to establish mana whenua, alongside other principles which include discovery/exploration (whenua kite hou), ancestral rights (take tupuna), conquest or confiscation (take raupatu) or gifting (take tuku). Ahi kā refers literally to cooking fires that are continuously tended, however over time visible fire began to symbolise continuous occupation of an area by iwi and hapū (tribes and sub-tribes). Ahi kā traditionally was shown by activities such as maintenance of eel weirs, resource gathering, physical occupation shown by kāinga (villages), pā (forts), and urupā (cemeteries). If land was abandoned or only rarely used, it was referred to as ahi tere (an unstable flame). If an area had been completed abandoned, it was described as ahi mataotao (a cold or extinguished fire).

Ahi kā can also refer to people who occupy an area, left behind to maintain continuous occupation. Traditionally, if an iwi or hapū were defeated in battle and were forced to retreat, a small number of people were often left in the hinterlands of their former lands to tend the fires of occupation. These fires were tended in order to keep the claim of continuous occupation while the group built up strength to retake their former lands. During the Musket Wars in the 1820s, most people fled the Tāmaki Makaurau Region for safer areas of the country, such as the Waikato Region. Many tribes such as Te Kawerau ā Maki and Ngāi Tai ki Tāmaki left small numbers of people behind to maintain ahi kā. During the Ihumātao sale and development protests in the 2010s, the New Zealand Government and Fletcher Construction was criticised for not consulting the ahi kā of Ihumātao (i.e. the Te Ahiwaru Waiohua and Ngāti Mahuta residents of Ihumātao Village).

From the 1860s, the Native Land Court (now Māori Land Court) used ahi kā as a principle in settling claims between iwi, however showed a preference for claims of conquest, and allowed hereditary inheritance even in cases where people did not currently live in their ancestral lands. The Waitangi Tribunal continues to use ahi kā as a guiding principle to establish land rights.
