= Pania Newton =

New Zealand lawyer and activist

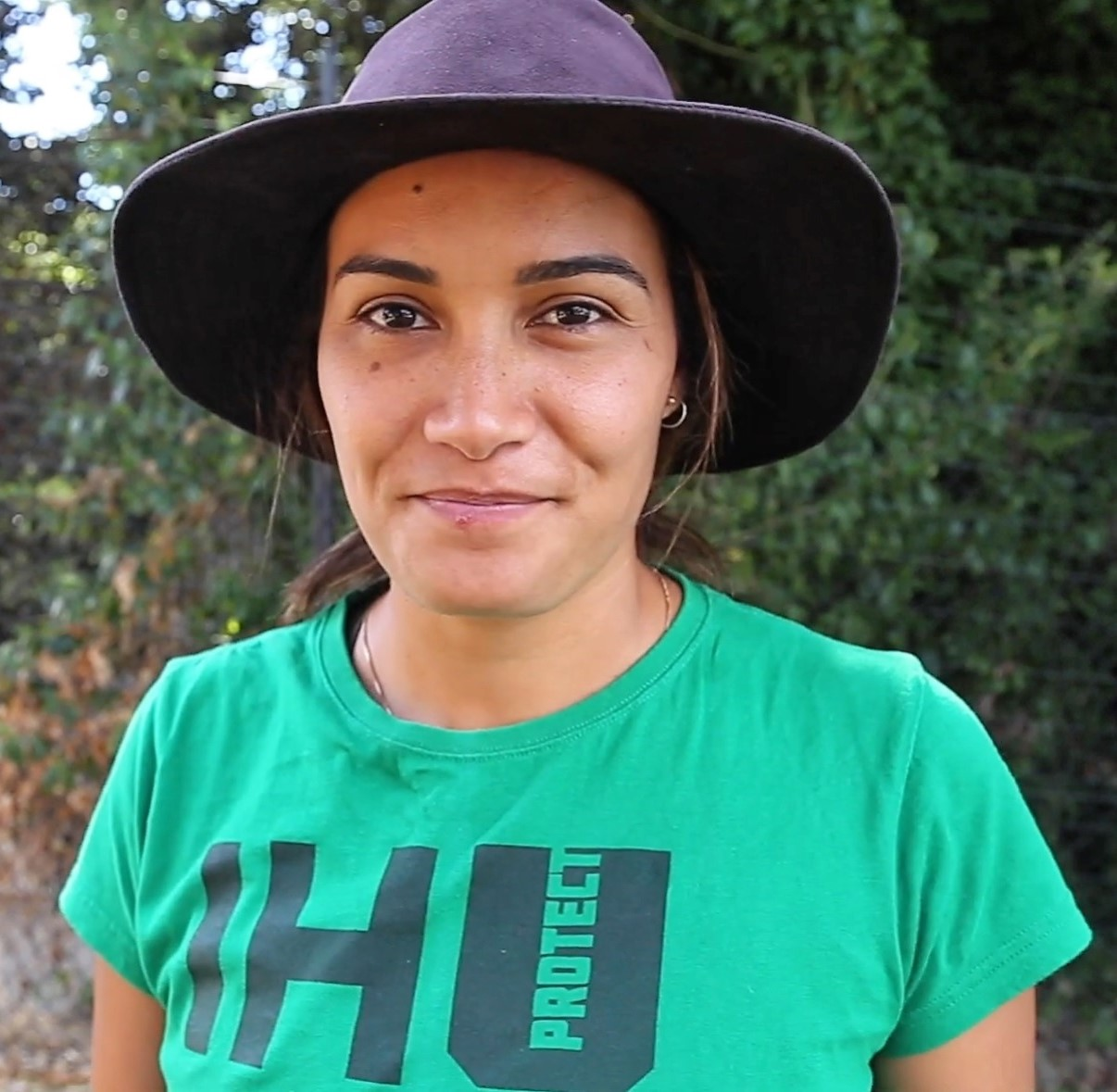
- Newton at the Fletcher building protest in 2019
- Born: 1990 or 1991 (age 35–36)
- Education: University of Auckland (LLB/BHlth, 2015)
- Occupations: Lawyer; activist
- Known for: Protest of land development at Ihumātao
- Children: 1

Pania Newton (born 1990 or 1991) is a New Zealand lawyer and activist for Māori land rights. In 2016, Newton was a co-founder and spokesperson of the group Save Our Unique Landscape (SOUL), which protested against the development of land at Ihumātao in south Auckland from 2016 to 2020. As a result of the group's protest action, the New Zealand government purchased the land from the developer in 2020, although as of 2022 its future remains unresolved.

== Early life and education ==
Newton grew up in south Auckland, spending most of her life in Ihumātao, and attended Te Kura Māori o Ngā Tapuwae. She is a member of the iwi (tribes) of Ngāpuhi, Waikato, Ngāti Mahuta and Ngāti Maniapoto. She completed a double degree in law and health sciences at the University of Auckland in 2015. Newton initially moved to Rotorua after graduating to take up a position in a law firm; however, she returned to Auckland after hearing about the development at Ihumātao in south Auckland and deciding to protest against it.

== Land activism ==
In 2016, Newton, alongside her five cousins and other supporters, formed the group Save Our Unique Landscape (SOUL) to protest the development of land at Ihumātao, which had been taken from Māori ownership in 1863. She has said they were inspired by Whina Cooper and other Māori women protestors. Although Newton was the youngest of the six cousins, she became the spokesperson and lead of the campaign.

The SOUL group was established with help from local community representatives, and opposed the building of 480 homes by the developer Fletcher Building. Newton advocated for the government to buy the land back and preserve it for all New Zealanders. She led the occupation of the land during the peaceful protests and herself lived in a caravan for over three years. Newton and the other protestors living at the site faced opposition from Fletcher, which issued them trespass notices in 2016 and attempted to demolish a farmhouse on the property in 2017.

In 2017, Newton and fellow SOUL member Delwyn Roberts travelled to the United Nations Permanent Forum on Indigenous Issues in New York City, where she presented two papers about the Ihumātao issues, outlining its cultural and historical significance to Māori. Newton visited the United Nations on two other occasions to advocate for the cause. Following her first visit, in August 2017, a United Nations report said that the government had not adequately consulted with the local iwi, and recommended that the government re-evaluate whether the plan was compliant with the Treaty of Waitangi and the United Nations Declaration on the Rights of Indigenous People.

In November 2018, Newton and others lost an appeal to the Environment Court seeking that the development be blocked. Later that month, a group of about 30 protestors including Newton attended Fletcher's annual general meeting to protest against the development. In April 2019, Newton said that Fletcher had cut power to the occupation site in an attempt to force protestors to leave.

In July 2019, the protestors were issued with an eviction order by Fletcher. Following media coverage, the government announced there would be no building activity on the site until a solution was reached, and Auckland Council agreed to meet with the protestors. Newton criticised the government for its lack of cooperation with the local community, and said she was disappointed that Prime Minister Jacinda Ardern had not met with SOUL. She did however meet with the minister for Māori development, Nanaia Mahuta, on 31 July 2019, and described it as a positive meeting.

As a result of the increased media attention, the protest grew by hundreds of people with visitors to the site that drew public figures Stan Walker, Ladi6 and others. Police presence at the site increased in early August 2019. On 5 August a standoff with police took place; Newton said police had rammed her with a gate as she was seeking to protect minors on the protest frontline, which police denied. The police presence was ultimately reduced on 16 August. Later that month, she and other protestors undertook a hīkoi (protest march) to the prime minister's Auckland office, where they delivered a petition asking Ardern to visit the land.

In December 2019, Newton announced that she was pregnant and that her baby would be born at Ihumātao. In February 2020, Heritage New Zealand announced that the area had been given the highest heritage status category, but Newton said the change was largely symbolic as it did not prevent development from going ahead. In March 2020, shortly after her daughter was born and with the start of New Zealand's COVID-19 lockdown, she was one of thirty people remaining on the land, and said that they would isolate together. She noted that the negotiations about the future of the land between the government, the Kīngitanga movement and the council had been put on hold due to COVID-19.

In December 2020 the government purchased the land from the developer, with the intention of using it for housing. Newton said she was keen to ensure discussions continued about preserving the cultural heritage of the land. As of July 2022 a planned steering committee to examine future land use was still in the process of being appointed, and The New Zealand Herald reported that a decision on the future of the land could be up to five years away. At that time, Newton continued to live on the land with her daughter.

== Recognition and other activities ==
Newton was a member of the youth arm of Matike Mai Aotearoa, a Māori-led constitutional reform project which ran until 2017. In 2018 she was a finalist for the Young Achiever's Award at the Matariki Awards.

In 2019 Newton was named as part of the University of Auckland's 40 Under 40 list; The New Zealand Herald commented that she "stands out on a list that recognises professional success for her rejection of a conventional career". In the same year she received a scholarship from the Queen's Commonwealth Trust to attend the One Young World summit "for young leaders who have demonstrated a commitment to effecting positive change", and was a founding board member of Kī o Rahi Tāmaki Makaurau, a regional sports organisation established to promote kī-o-rahi in Auckland.

In 2021 Newton was a semi-finalist in the youth category of the New Zealander of the Year awards. She was also selected for the 2022 Atlantic Fellows for Social Equity programme, a partnership between the University of Auckland and the University of Melbourne, and said she would use the programme as an opportunity to explore what was learnt from the Ihumātao campaign.
