= Puke Ariki =

Museum and public library in New Plymouth

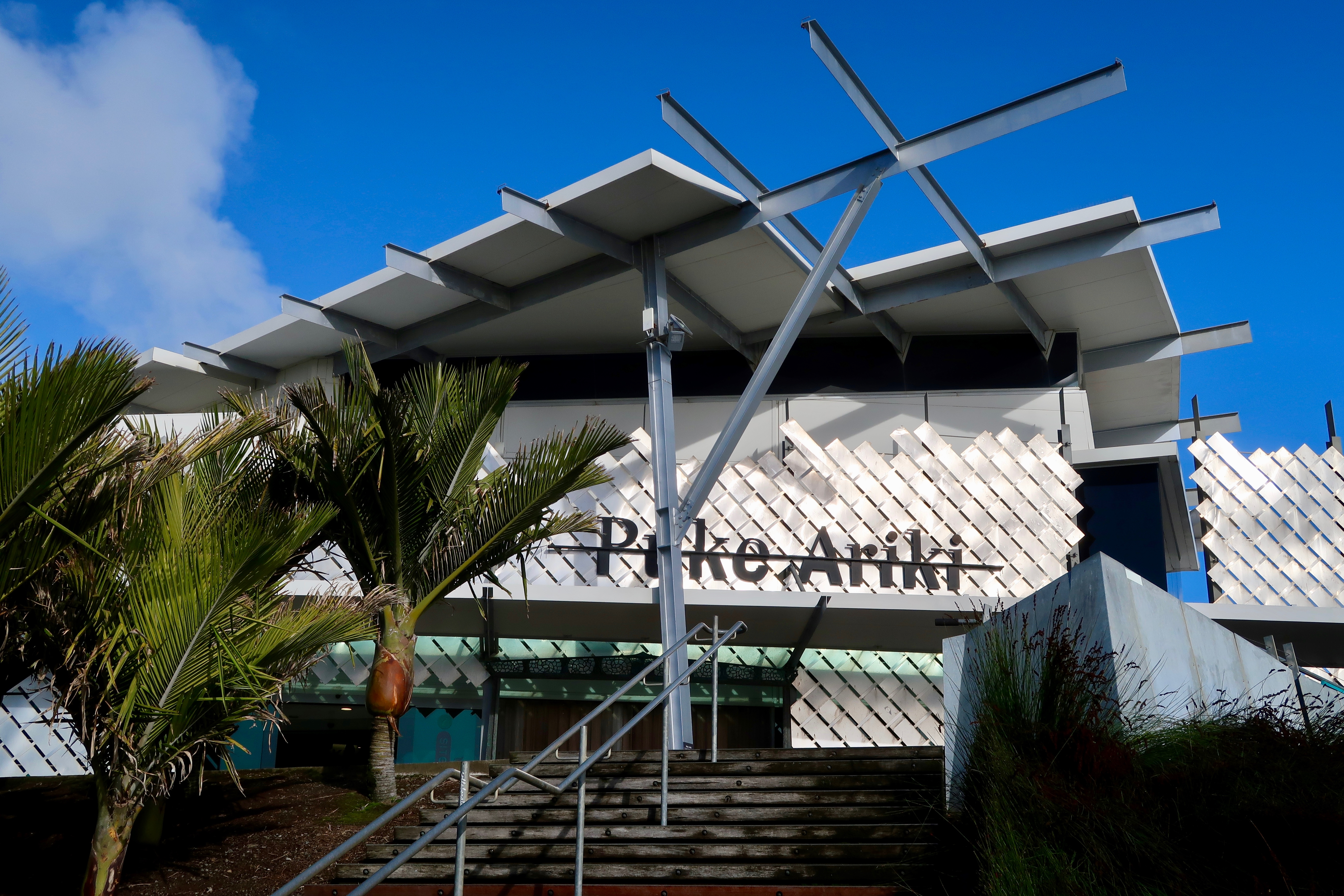
- North building of Puke Ariki
- Former name: Taranaki Museum, New Plymouth Public Library
- Established: 1848 (library), 1919 (museum)
- Location: New Plymouth
- Coordinates: 39°03′25″S 174°04′19″E
- Type: Museum, Public library
- Manager: Colleen Mullin
- Website: pukeariki.com

Puke Ariki is a combined museum and library at New Plymouth, New Zealand, which opened in June 2003. It is an amalgamation of the New Plymouth Public Library (founded in 1848) and the Taranaki Museum (founded in 1919). Its name, Māori for "hill of chiefs", is taken from the Māori village that formerly occupied the site.

== Site ==
Puke Ariki (Māori: hill of chiefs) was the site of a significant Māori pā of Te Āti Awa, dating back to 1700, with a marae called Para-huka. It was the home of the paramount rangatira (chief) Te Rangi-apiti-rua. The pā was deserted around 1830 when the majority of Te Āti Awa moved to the Wellington region and Kāpiti Coast. When colonial settlement began in the area, the hill was renamed Mount Eliot by the New Plymouth settlers, and was the location of government buildings and a signalling station for ships in the area. It was used as a military camp for British forces in the 1850s and 1860s, and was a barracks for the Naval Brigade during the First Taranaki War. Most of the hill was removed for land reclamation to form the railway yards, and by 1905 it had largely been demolished.

== Origins ==
The New Plymouth Public Library was founded in 1848, as a Mechanics Institute and Library (often referred to as the institute). It initially was run from the premises of a school on Vivian Street, then in October 1852 moved to an auction room on Devon St. It was renamed the Literary Institute in 1856, but had no funding to build a permanent home for some years, and much of its collection was destroyed in a fire in 1859. The institute and library occupied the ground floor of the newly built Provincial Council Town Hall building in 1865, but despite paying no rent it fell into debt and was dissolved in 1878, although the reading room remained.

The first museum exhibits in New Plymouth date back to 1865 and were housed in the Town Hall; for many years the museum, library, and reading room were regarded as one organisation. Reading room fees were imposed from 1880, but in 1884 the council declared that the reading room would function as a "free public library", although funding was quite limited, its librarians were untrained, and its collection was very disordered. All this changed when a new Carnegie Free Library, funded by a £2,500 grant from philanthropist Andrew Carnegie, was built on a site on King Street and opened in July 1908. The first full-time librarian, a Miss Free, was appointed in 1908 at a salary of £60 (she remained on staff for 22 years, later as Assistant Librarian, resigning in 1942).

In November 1895, William Skinner first petitioned the council for a dedicated room for the museum in the Town Hall building; a similar petition was received in 1900. In 1913 Skinner and his son Prof. H. D. Skinner offered the town their collection of Māori artifacts and historical documents, on the condition that they be displayed in a suitably furnished fireproof building that would function as a "purely Taranaki museum". An annex was eventually built behind the Carnegie Library at a cost of £3,000; the old Town Hall exhibits were moved there in 1918, and the Skinner collection in 1919. The Taranaki Museum opened on 28 August 1919.

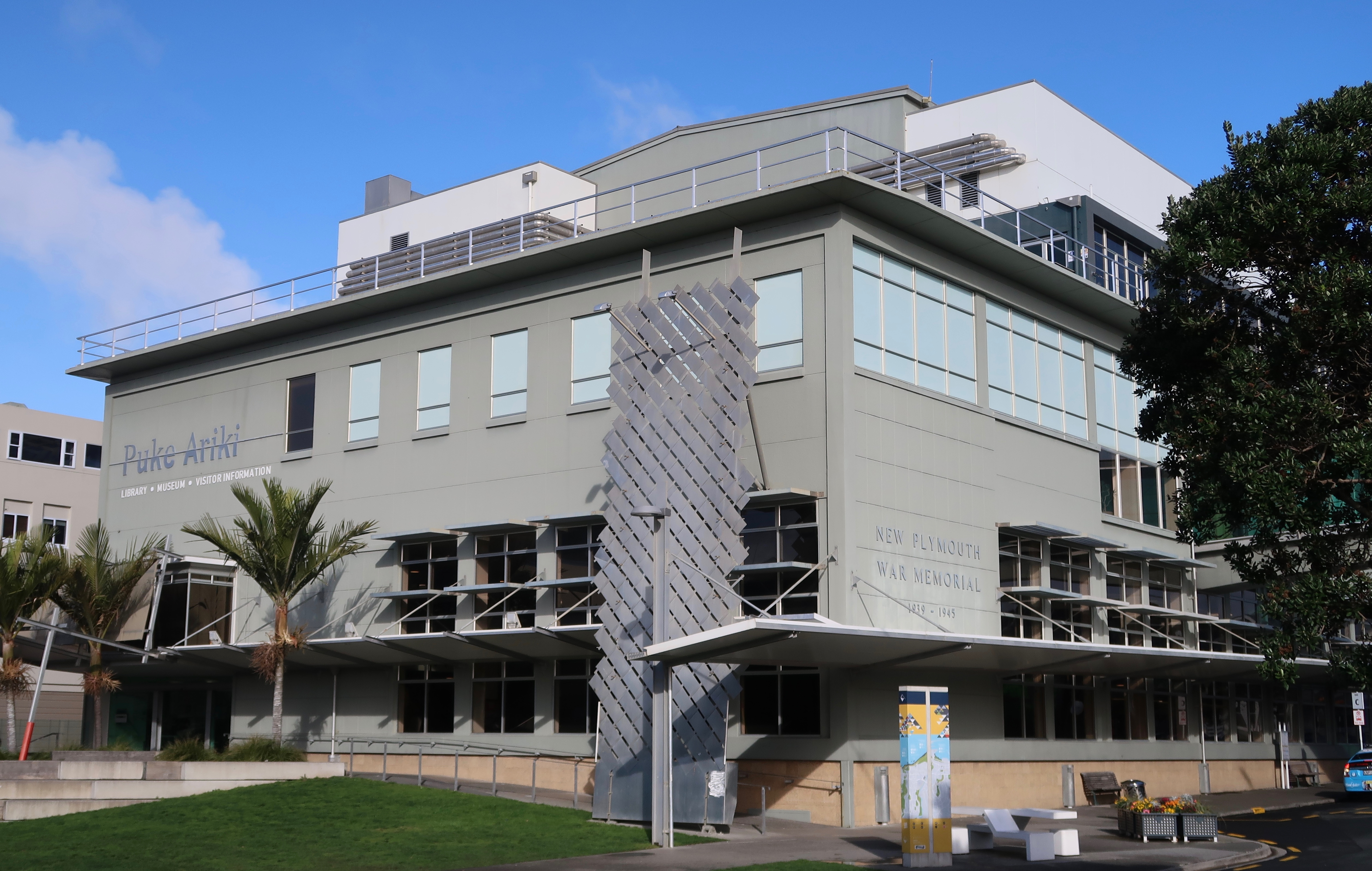
The original 1960 War Memorial building now houses the library and archives of Puke Ariki

The library was reorganised on a Dewey system in 1922, and the headquarters of the Polynesian Society moved to Wellington in 1925, creating more space. In 1927 contention over the ownership and display of two Māori treasures – the anchor stone of the Tokomaru canoe and the adze used in its construction – was resolved in a meeting between museum administration and representatives of three iwi.

By the 1930s, the museum and library were considered hopelessly overcrowded, and a new site was sought, but it was many years before approval was granted for a combined library, museum, and war memorial building on a site bounded by King, Brougham, and Ariki streets. The building was designed by Taylor and Collins, and the contractors were Fairbrother, Snowden and Wheeler Ltd. Planning began in 1954, and the four-story building opened on 14 July 1960. Its top floor was the War Memorial Hall, the next floor the Taranaki Museum, and the mezzanine and ground floors the library. One wing, designated for art display, was occupied by the North Taranaki Society for Arts, until they were forced out by a need for more museum display space.

== 2003 building ==
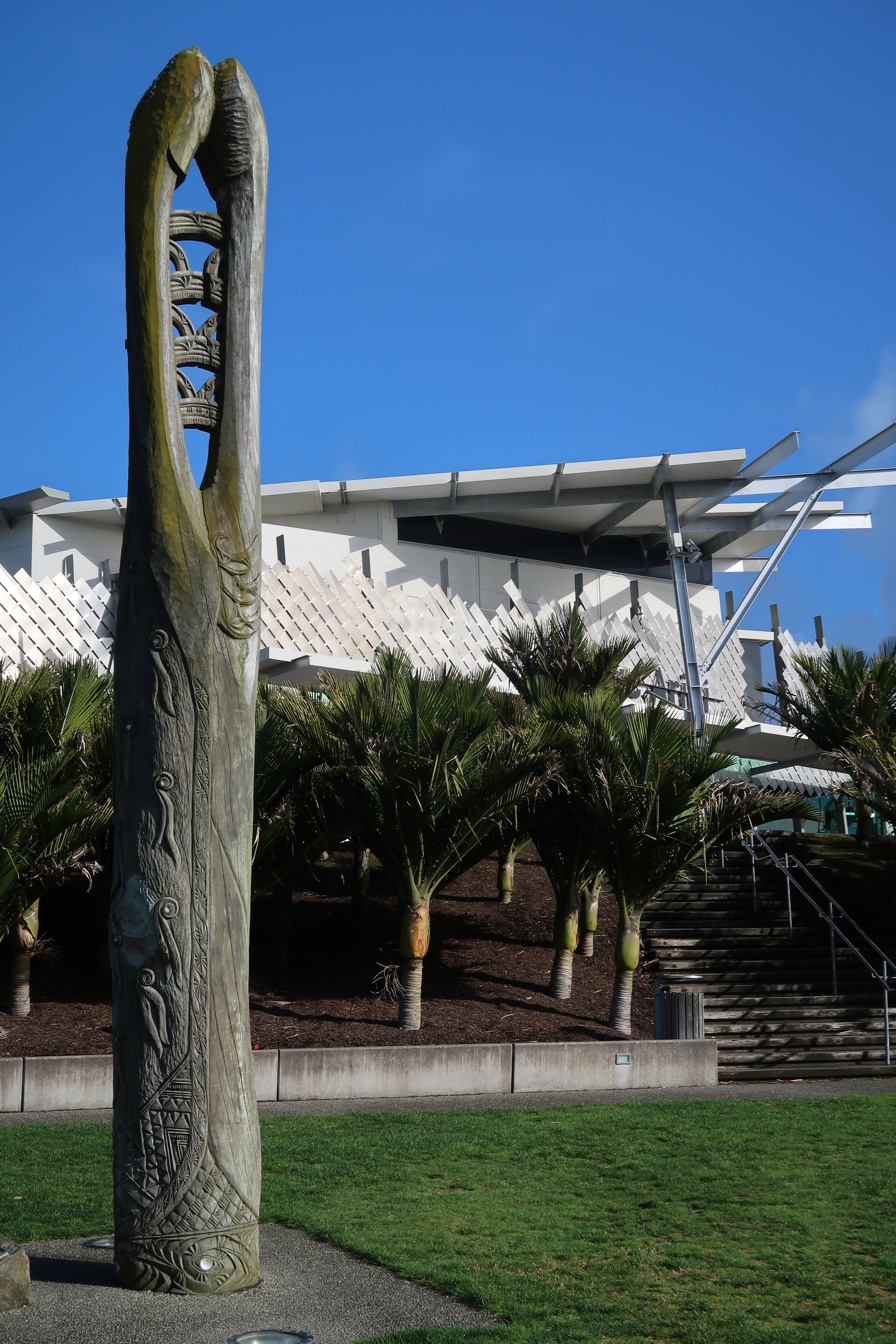
Tukotahi/Standing Together

By the 1980s, both library and museum were running out of room for storage and display. Planning for an expanded building to be called Puke Ariki, after the original pā site, began in 1993. It was intended to amalgamate the Taranaki Museum and existing public library. The New Plymouth District Council committed NZ$12.3 million in funding, and another $11 million was raised externally. The architects were local firm Boon Goldsmith Bhaskar (Team Architecture), and construction was carried out by Clelands Construction. Their brief was to retrofit the original 1960 War Memorial building and construct an addition 5000 m^{2} museum space. The architects designed the new building to reach the same height as the former Puke Ariki hill before it was excavated as landfill, placing the Māori Taonga level at the original height of 4.5 metres (15 ft) above ground level. The building exterior was clad in a 60-metre (200 ft) woven wall. Puke Ariki was opened by the Prime Minister Helen Clark on 15 June 2003.

Eight Taranaki iwi collaborated on the Puke Ariki project; in 1996–97 a Komiti Māori was formed to represent them and give input into the project.

The 1960 War Memorial building contains the library, archives, and research centre, and connects via a second floor airbridge with the new building containing the museum, iSite information centre, cafe, and restaurant. In front of Puke Ariki is a 2001 carved pou (pole), Tukotahi/Standing Together, depicting the first meeting of Māori and Pākehā settlers in Taranaki. The largest cultural project ever undertaken in the Taranaki region, Puke Ariki won Creative New Zealand's prestigious Creative Places Award for 2003.

== Collections ==
The founding museum collections donated by William Skinner were well-documented Māori taonga (treasures), including a rare dogskin cloak (huruhuru kurī). Skinner was a Taranaki surveyor, and later Commissioner of Crown Lands in Blenheim, so had travelled extensively and was well known to local iwi. The current collections consist primarily of archives, social history, taonga Māori, and a large pictorial collection.

A significant feature of the taonga Māori collection are the Motonui epa or panels. Forming the back wall of a pataka or storehouse, they are thought to have been crafted by Te Āti Awa artisans between 1750 and 1820. The panels were buried in a swamp near Motonui for safekeeping during tribal warfare. Rediscovered in 1972, they were sold to George Ortiz, a Bolivian collector residing in Switzerland, for US$65,000. Ortiz took them out of New Zealand, violating laws on the export of national treasures, then in 1978 attempted to sell them to recoup a ransom he had paid for his kidnapped daughter. After many years of negotiation and Ortiz's death in 2013, the New Zealand government paid $4.5 million to have them returned, and in March 2014 they were deposited in Puke Ariki under a guardianship arrangement agreed to by the Crown, Te Āti Awa, and Ngāti Rahiri. They went on display in the Takapou Whariki o Taranaki gallery in October 2015. The story of the panels is told in the 2022 book Te Motunui Epa.

The greater part of the photographic collection is the Swainson/Woods studios collection of over 111,000 negatives of vernacular photography from the 1920s to the 1990s, donated in 2005 and digitised by 2016.

== Staff ==
Rigby Allan, appointed Acting Curator of the then-Taranaki Museum in 1959, became Director in November 1961 and retired in 1973. Ron Lambert became director of the museum in 1975, at which time there were only three staff. He became Collection Manager in 1999, then Senior Researcher in 2001 before that role was disestablished in a 2016 restructure. Roger Fyfe was Deputy Director from 1979 to 1992, before joining Canterbury Museum as Curator of Ethnology.

From 2005 to 2011 Bill Macnaught was Manager, leaving to become National Librarian. Fiona Emberton headed the institution from September 2011 to November 2012. Kelvin Day, who started at Taranaki Museum in 1992, and had been Manager Heritage Collections since 2008, was appointed Director in March 2013. He left in January 2019, and was replaced as Manager by the acting director of the Govett-Brewster Art Gallery, Colleen Mullin. Frith Williams later took up the position of Museum Lead in November 2024.

== Exhibitions ==
Puke Ariki's most popular exhibition was Bugs! Our Backyard Heroes, curated by Aimee Burbery, which ran from November 2016 to May 2017. As well as pinned specimens from the Ken Fox collection, it featured live cockroaches, stick insects, centipedes, and spiders. Bugs! attracted over 65,000 visitors, and broke the daily visitor record on 3 January 2017 with 1788 attendees.

Hina: Celebrating Taranaki Women featured the stories of 11 different Taranaki women, and was curated by Kararaina Te Ira, Curator of Taonga Māori. It opened on the 125th anniversary of women's suffrage in New Zealand and closed in March 2019.
