= Wiroa Island =

Island in Auckland, New Zealand

Native name: Wiroa
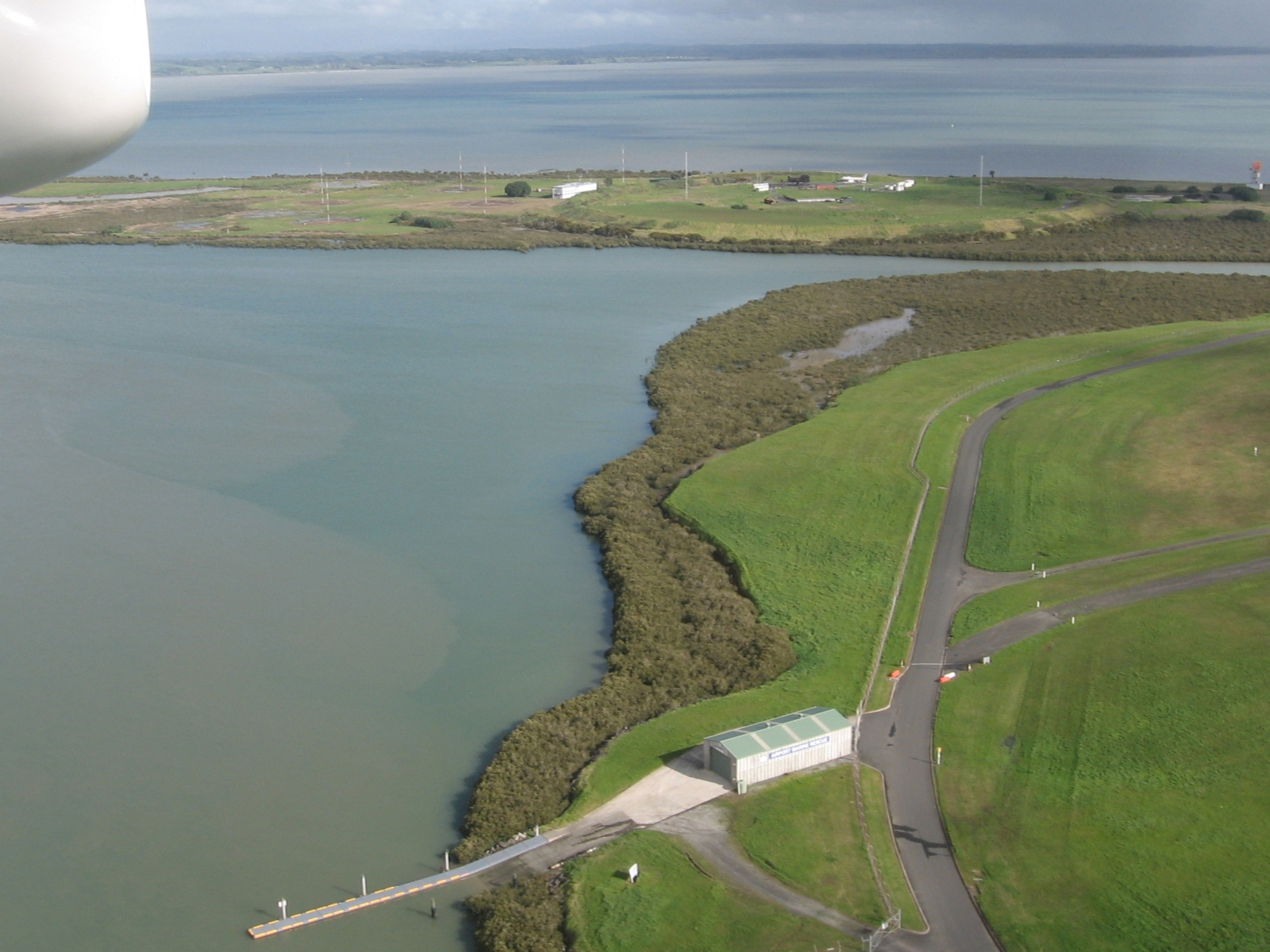
- The mouth of Pukaki Creek and Wiroa Island
- Interactive map of Wiroa Island

Geography
- Location: North Island, New Zealand
- Coordinates: 37°00′54″S 174°48′32″E
- Area: 38.7 ha (96 acres)
- Length: 1,400 m (4600 ft)
- Width: 390 m (1280 ft)
- Highest elevation: 5 m (16 ft)

Wiroa Island, or just Wiroa, is an island in Manukau Harbour, New Zealand. The island is located at the mouth of Pukaki Creek, directly southeast of Auckland Airport.

== Geography ==
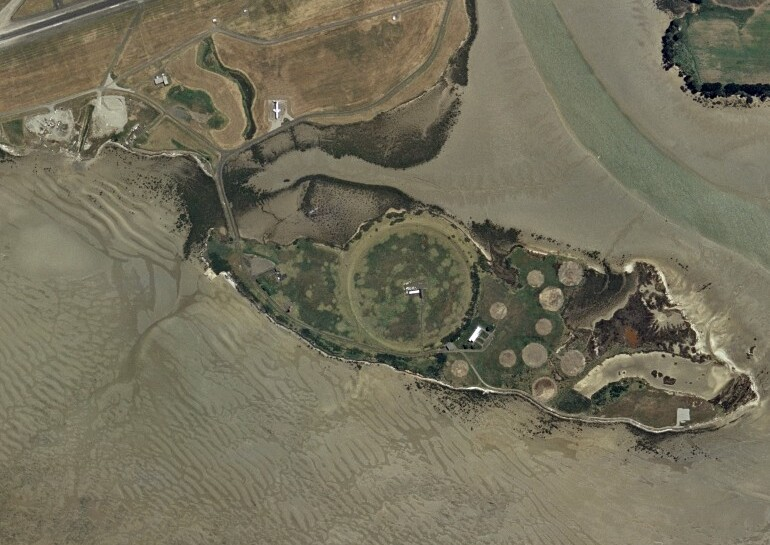
Aerial view of Wiroa Island from 2003 or 2004

Wiroa Island is located southeast of the Auckland Airport complex and is only connected to the mainland by a narrow, approximately 370-metre-long (1,210 ft) causeway, on which a road leads to the island. The approximately 38.7-hectare (96-acre) island has a length of around 1.4 kilometres (0.87 mi) in a west-northwest–east-southeast direction, and measures around 390 metres (1,280 ft) in a north-northeast–south-southwest direction at its widest point. The island lies less than five metres (16 ft) above the water level of the Manukau Harbour. As the island is a part of the Auckland Airport complex, it is inaccessible to the public. It is the 2nd largest island in the Manukau Harbour, after Puketutu Island and before Pararekau Island in the SE corner of the harbour.

== History ==
Historically, Tāmaki Māori used the island to collect red ochre. Its traditional name, Kohia, is a reference to this.

The surrounding area became farmland after being bought from local Māori, with one of the last families to farm it from 1936–1948 being the Westney family (direct descendants of the Westney family that donated the land the preserved Westney Road Methodist Church sat on from 1856–2007 before it got shifted to another Airport owned site and restored) were market gardeners here and grew all sorts of vegetables and fruits as well as flowers for the markets. The Westneys had a few sheep, cows and pigs as well on the island during their ownership of it. In 1928 the adjacent land on the Māngere Peninsula was used as the Mangere Aerodrome, later being developed into an international airport, Auckland Airport, opened in 1966. During this period, Wiroa Island became a part of the airport complex, and a radar tower was constructed on the island.

== Bird protection ==
A bird habitat was created on the southeastern part of the island, to divert birds away from the airport airfield.

== Gallery ==
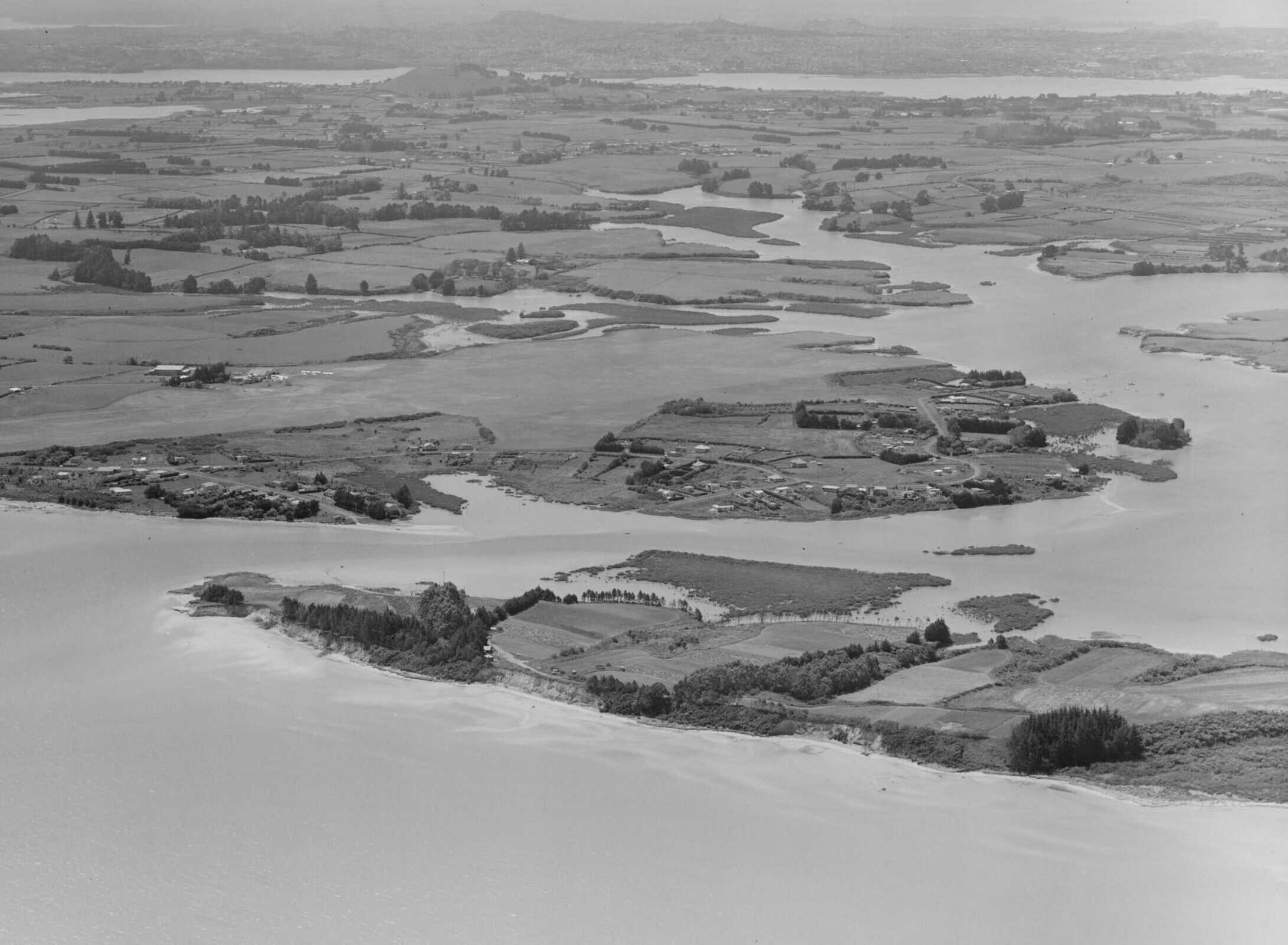
Aerial view of Wiroa Island in 1954 before the construction of Auckland Airport

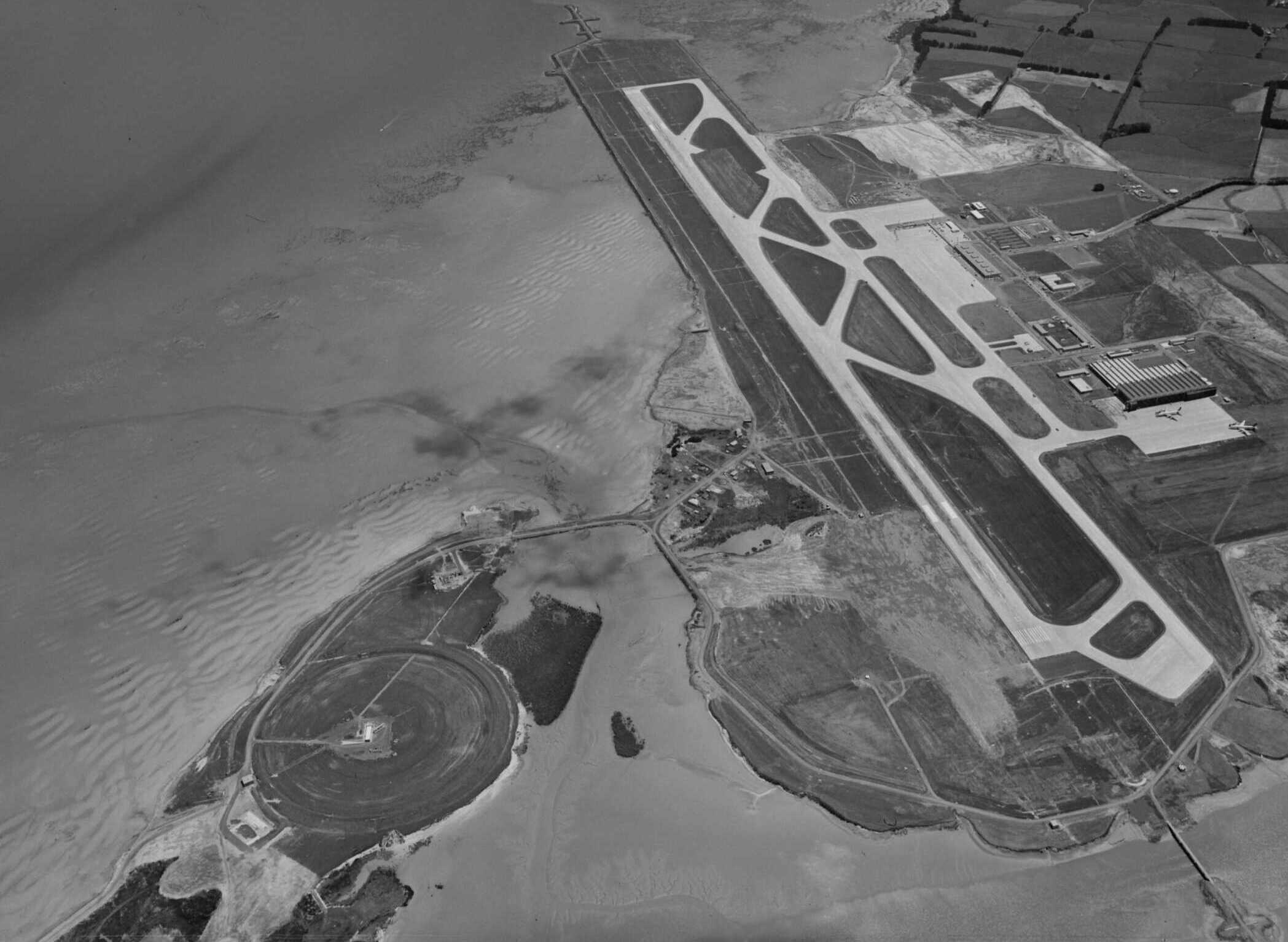
Aerial view of Wiroa Island in 1965 during the construction of Auckland Airport
