= Maungataketake =

Volcano in New Zealand

Coordinates: 36.994635°S 174.747548°E

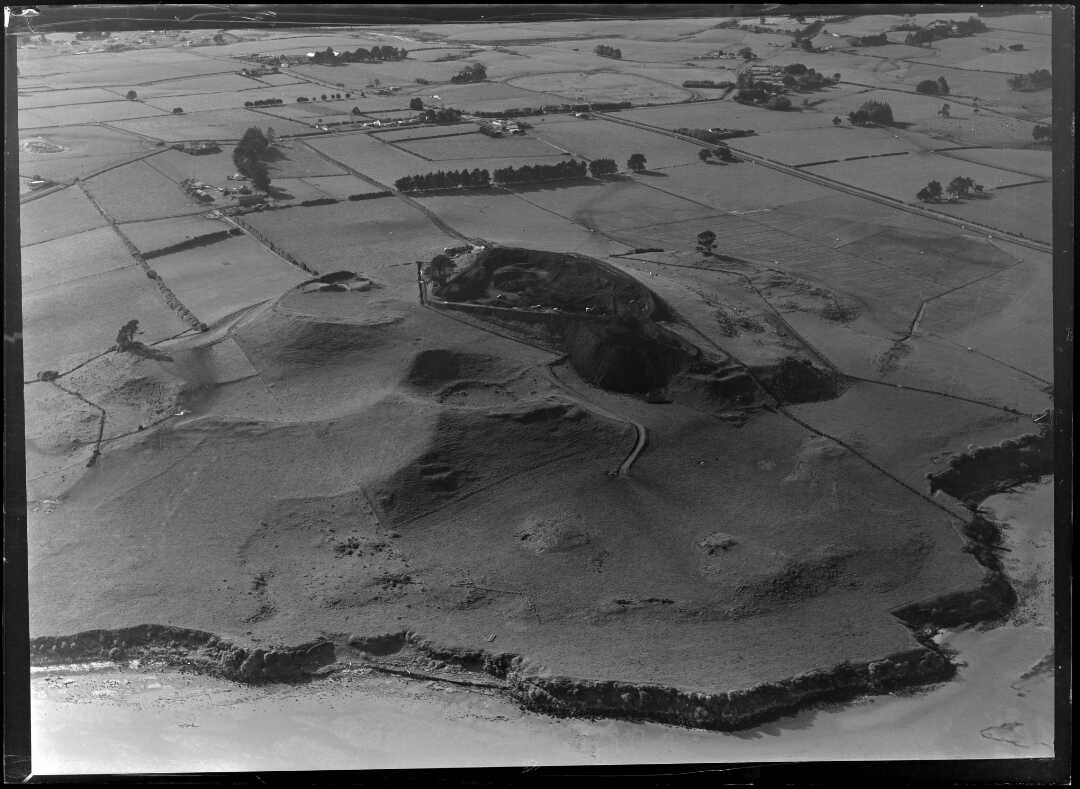
Aerial view of Maungataketake in 1964

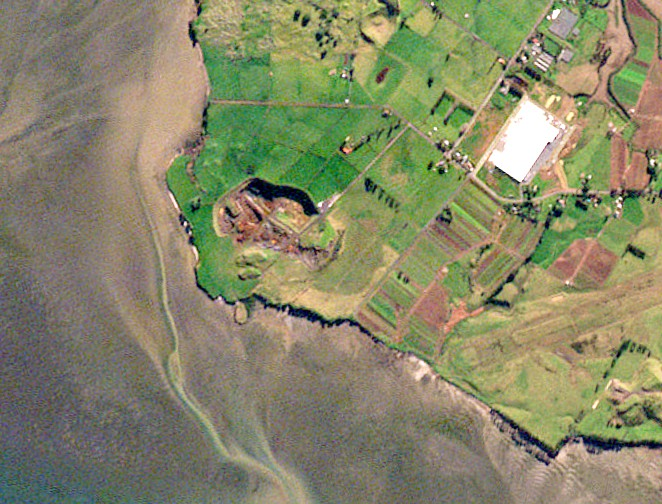
Satellite view of Maungataketake after being quarried (2016)

Maungataketake (also Ellett's Mount) is one of the volcanoes in the Auckland volcanic field in New Zealand. It had a 76 m high scoria cone, beside a 100 m wide crater, before they were quarried away. It was the site of a pā. Layers of volcanic tuff and ash from Maungataketake overlay the fallen trunks of the nearby Ihumātao fossil forest. The New Zealand Ministry for Culture and Heritage gives a translation of "broad mountain" for Maungataketake.

The volcano erupted an estimated 90,000 years before the present. Maungataketake was one of the earliest archaeological sites in New Zealand, with charcoal samples dating to the Archaic period of Māori history. Extensive stone gardens were built by Tāmaki Māori at Maungataketake, Ōtuataua and Ihumātao in the mid-1400s. In the early 1700s, Maungataketake was one of the major defensive pā during the Waiohua confederacy era.

In December 1862, the Ellett family purchased land from the former Wesleyan Mission at Ihumātao. Their association with the area led to the name Ellett's Mount for the volcano. In 1866, ownership of Maungataketake and Ihumātao was returned to Apihai Te Kawau, chief of Ngāti Whātua in Auckland, after the land confiscations instigated during the Invasion of the Waikato.

From September 1962, the volcanic cone was quarried for construction materials in the creation of Auckland Airport.
