= George Ortiz =

French art collector (1927–2013)

- Born: 10 May 1927; Paris, France
- Died: 8 October 2013 (aged 86); Geneva, Switzerland
- Occupation: Collector
- Spouse: Catherine

George Ortiz (10 May 1927 – 8 October 2013) was a collector who assembled what is considered to be one of the "finest collection of antiquities in private hands".

== Biography ==
George Ortiz was born in Paris May 10, 1927. His father, Jorge Ortiz Linares, was Ambassador of Bolivia to France, and his mother Graziella was the daughter of the Bolivian tin mining magnate Simón I. Patiño. George Ortiz studied in France, UK and USA. In 1949, a trip to Greece revealed a passion for antique objects. He begins collecting and over the ensuing decades forms "one of the world's greatest private collections of ancient and tribal art". He died in Geneva October 8, 2013.

== The George Ortiz Collection ==
The George Ortiz Collection is a selection of some 280 masterpieces from the collection that was exhibited in the Hermitage Museum (Saint Petersburg), the Pushkin Museum (Moscow), the Royal Academy (London) and the Altes Museum (Berlin). At the time he was criticized by some for having exported works from their countries of origin.

In 1961 he was accused of having stolen property in his collection. This was resolved 15 years later when he was given a short suspended sentence. He campaigned against the 1970 UNESCO and 1995 UNIDROIT conventions restricting the export of cultural objects.

In 1978 Ortiz held an auction to sell many of his collected works from Africa and the Pacific to recover the reported $2 million that he had paid the year before as ransom when his daughter had been kidnapped. Included in that collection was the Motunui epa, Māori carved wood panels from a storehouse, that Ortiz had purchased for US$65,000 then taken to Switzerland. The New Zealand courts claimed Ortiz had violated their laws against export of national treasures. After years of negotiation, and Ortiz's death in 2013, the Motonui panels were purchased by the New Zealand government for NZ$4.5 million, and in March 2014 they were deposited in Puke Ariki Museum in New Plymouth.

== Bibliography ==
- Catalogue: The George Ortiz Collection (Benteli Publishers Ltd., Bern, 1993, ISBN 3-7165-1026-2)
- Sales catalogue Sotheby's 29 June 1978
