= Pukeiti (Auckland) =

Volcano in Auckland, New zealand

Coordinates: 36.983756°S 174.757183°E

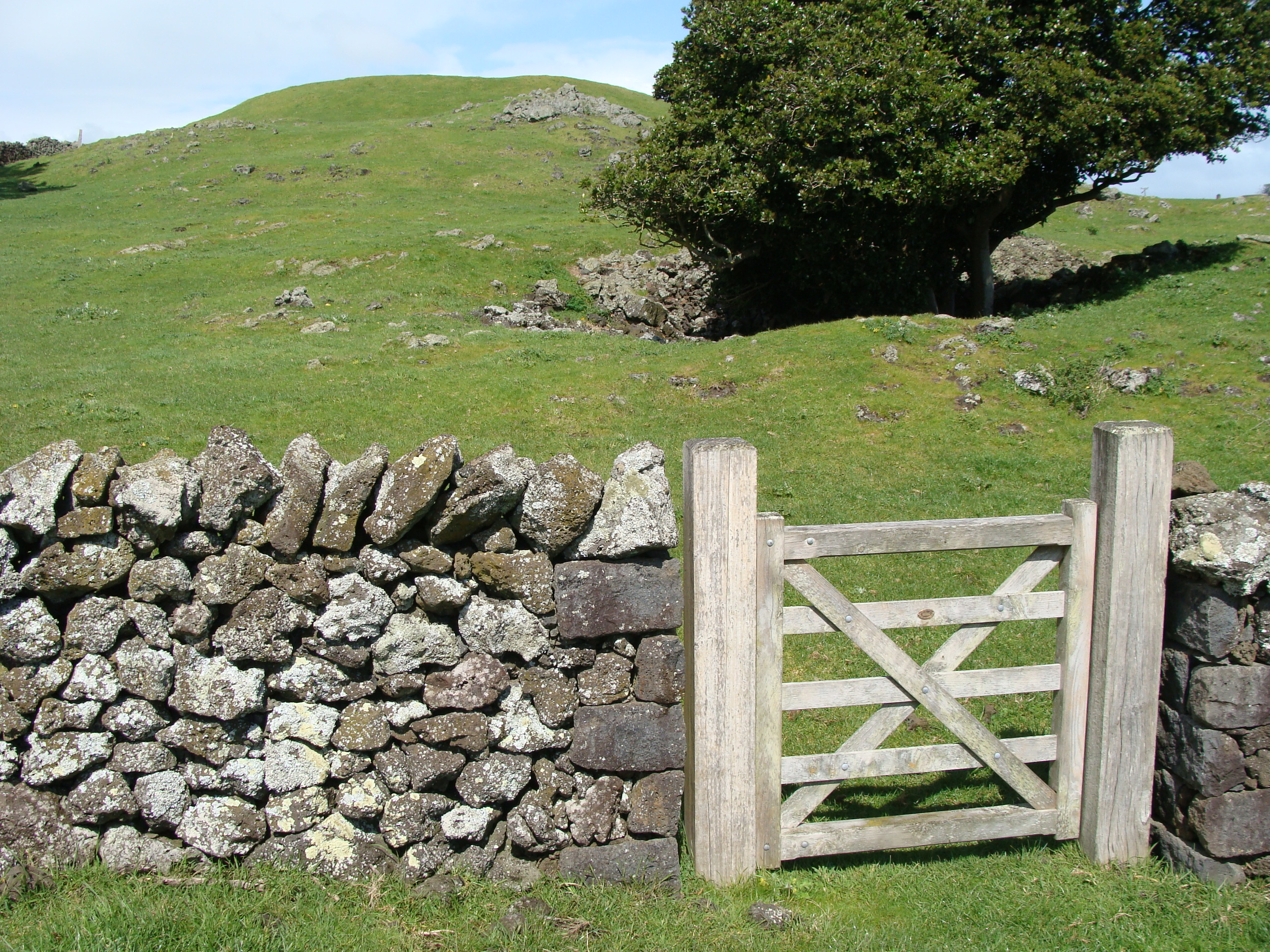
The northern side of Pukeiti scoria cone.

Pukeiti is one of the volcanoes in the Auckland volcanic field. The spatter cone is the smallest volcano in Auckland, reaching 30 metres (98 ft) above sea level, and has a shallow crater over 30 metres (98 ft) wide. The crater rim was quarried on the south and east side. Extensive lava poured out from this vent to form a lava flow field to the north and east. It is now part of the Otuataua Stonefields reserve.

The New Zealand Ministry for Culture and Heritage gives a translation of "cabbage tree hill" for Pukeitī.
