= Īhaka Takaanini =

19th century Te Ākitai Waiohua chief in Auckland, New Zealand

- Chief of Te Ākitai Waiohua
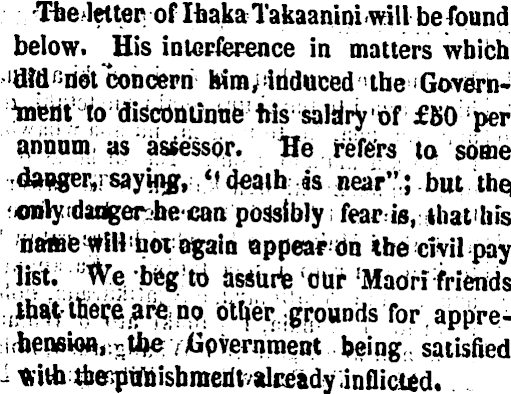
- Letter of Īhaka Takaanini, written March 26, 1863
- Predecessor: Pepene Te Tihi
- Successor: Te Wirihana Takaanini
- Born: 1800
- Died: 1864; Rākino Island
- Spouse: Riria Ratauhinga
- Father: Pepene Te Tihi

Īhaka or Ihaka Takaanini (1800–1864) was a chief of the Te Ākitai Waiohua tribe, which occupied lands in the southern region of Auckland. The South Auckland suburb of Takanini is named in his honour.

A prominent figure within the Auckland and Waikato regions, Takaanini played a large role in many land sales and peacemaking ventures throughout his lifetime, even working for the Crown as a land assessor. Despite his positive relationship with Pākehā, often being referred to as 'old Isaac', Takaanini, alongside 22 other iwi members, including his immediate family, was captured by the Crown and imprisoned at Ōtāhuhu, and later Rākino Island, during the invasion of the Waikato in 1863. Takaanini later died on Rākino Island some time in early 1864.

Takaanini was the great-grandson of Kiwi Tāmaki, a paramount chief of the Waiohua confederation, and the founding ancestor of Te Ākitai Waiohua. Kiwi Tāmaki held power over Tāmaki Makaurau prior to the permanent presence of Ngāti Whātua on the Auckland isthmus.

== Biography ==
=== Family ===
Te Ākitai Waiohua has a well documented patrilineal line of descent, and Takaanini's ancestors are well known. His father was Pepene Te Tihi, a Te Ākitai chief, and his mother was Puakikitehau. His grandfather was Rangimatoru, also a Te Ākitai chief. His great-grandfather was Kiwi Tāmaki, the founding ancestor of Te Ākitai Waiohua, and the paramount chief of the Waiohua confederation.

Takaanini married Riria Ratauhinga, and together they had five children. They lived at Pukaki, Māngere, and Ramarama. Two of these children died while imprisoned at Camp Ōtahuhu, after being arrested by Crown officials due to Kingitanga affiliation in 1863. Their three surviving children were one daughter, named Erina Takaanini, and two sons, Īhaka Takaanini and Te Wirihana Takaanini, Te Wirihana succeeded his father as Te Ākitai Waiohua chief following Takaanini's death, and the South Auckland suburb of Wiri is named in his honour.

=== Crown employment ===
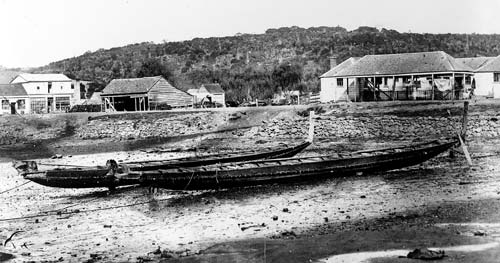
Māori Hostel at Mechanics Bay, Auckland, around 1860. This hostel was supervised by Īhaka Takaanini.

Takaanini was employed by the Crown as the Keeper of Native Hostelry in 1861, with responsibilities including the management of the Māori hostels in Mechanics Bay and Onehunga. Takaanini also worked as a land assessor for the Crown. Sitting within the structure of the newly established Native Land Court, the responsibilities of an assessor included travelling to the assessed piece of land and inspecting it carefully, and then producing a report to be included in the minutes book.

=== Land sales ===
Takaanini facilitated and participated in numerous land sales in the Auckland region, including:

- Tāmaki Block, which involved multiple iwi. Between 1836 and 1839, this land was sold to Anglican missionaries. Takaanini's father Pepene Te Tihi, and fellow Te Ākitai chief Mohi te Ahi a te Ngu, were also involved in the sale. This sale, which was roughly 83,000 acres, was investigated by the newly established Land Claims Commission three times, in 1841, 1842, and 1847. Following the third investigation, 5,500 acres of land was given to the missionary, while the remaining 78,000 acres was retained by the Crown as "surplus land". Importantly, upon the original sale, the missionary promised for one-third of the land to be retained by the iwi who made the sale, however this was not recognised by the Crown during their investigation.
- Waimai Block, sold in January 1840. Located at Taotaoroa in the Manukau district, multiple chiefs also signed the deed of sale. A plot of around 2,000 acres, following a Land Claims Commission investigation in 1844, multiple settlers retained just over 1000 acres, while the remaining land was retained by the Crown as "surplus".
- Papakura Block, purchased by the Crown in January 1842 for £400 and six horses. Purchased from Ngāti Taihaua, a hapū of Waiohua, with Takaanini being one of the six signatories. No survey was done at the time; the block is estimated at between 9,000 and 30,000 acres.
- Puatahinga Block, purchased by the Crown on 23 March 1854. Sold by two chiefs, one being Takaanini, for £100.
- Takapoutōtara Block, purchased by the Crown in July 1854 for £400. Takaanini and his father, alongside other chiefs, were involved in the sale.

=== Kingitanga and invasion of the Waikato ===
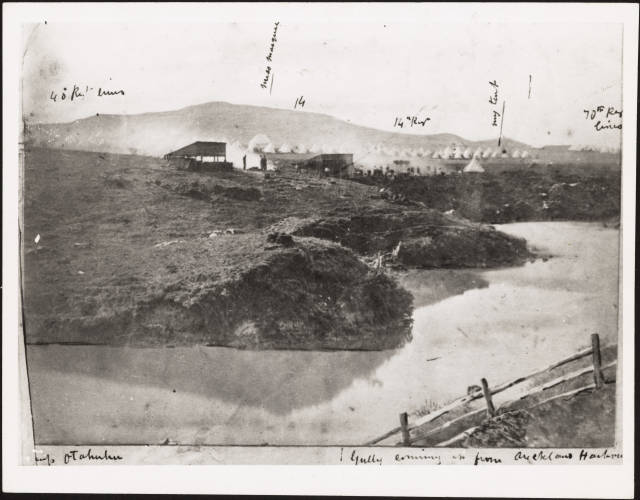
Camp Ōtahuhu, 1861. Īhaka Takaanini and 22 others were imprisoned here in 1863.

Te Ākitai Waiohua were closely linked to Waikato, and therefore the Kingitanga, as Pōtatau Te Wherowhero helped to escort the Te Ākitai people from Waikato back to Tāmaki Makaurau in order to resettle their lands during the wars of the early 19th century. Due to this connection, when Governor George Grey's proclamation was released in July 1863, calling for all Māori in the Manukau region to either swear an oath of loyalty to the Crown, or be evicted into the Waikato, Takaanini chose not to take the oath. Takaanini was subsequently stripped of his Crown titles, as both land assessor and native hostel manager. Accounts of Takaanini's whereabouts during this time are mixed, some report that Takaanini was part of the mass exodus into the Waikato, while translator James Fulloon claimed Takaanini to already be in Kirikiri at this time, and said he met with him 10 July 1863.

=== Arrest and imprisonment ===
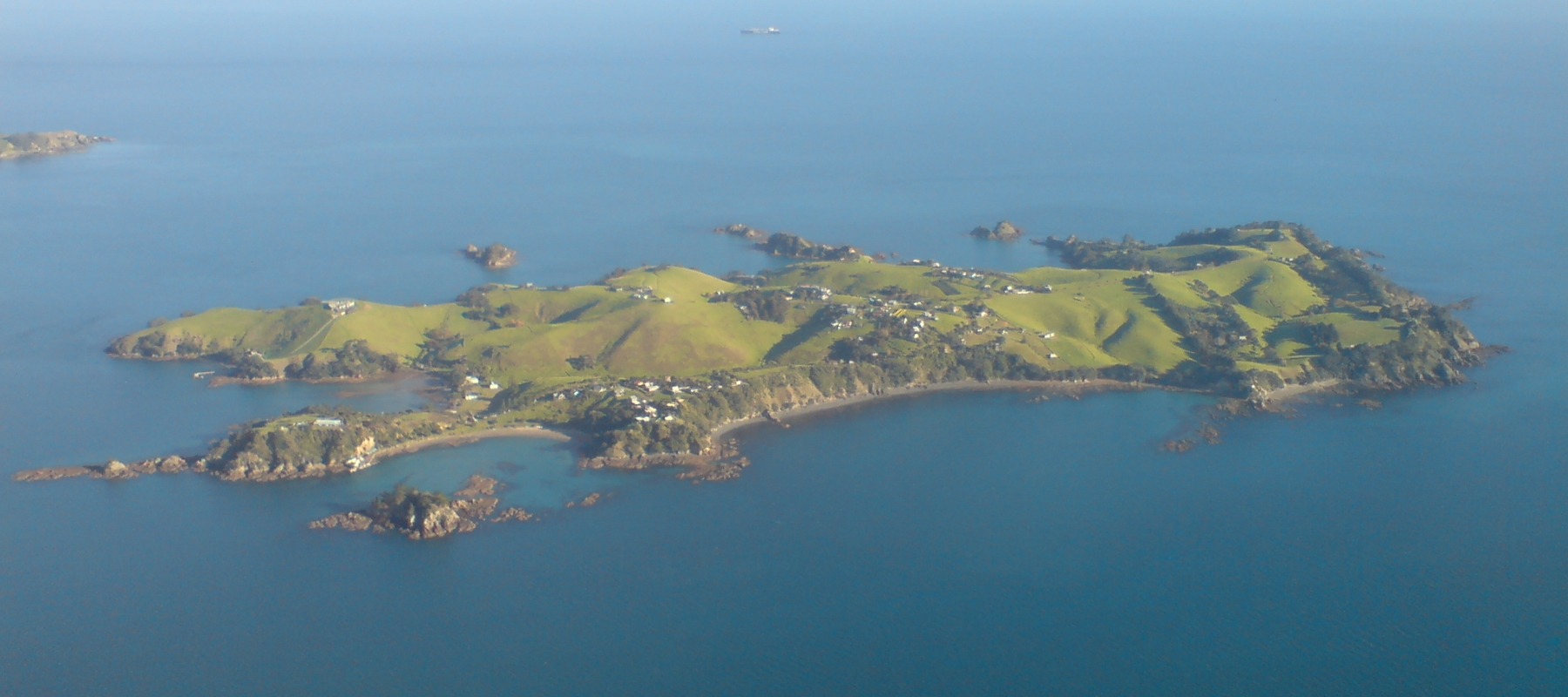
Rākino Island in the Hauraki Gulf, where Takaanini died

Following a gathering with Takaanini and other Te Ākitai members, rumors, likely started by local settlers, spread that the iwi were planning an uprising in response to Grey's proclamation. Because of this, the Native Minister Francis Dillon Bell travelled to Kirikiri from Auckland on 15 July 1863 to discuss the proclamation with Takaanini. Following this discussion Bell returned to Auckland, and Takaanini had determined that he would sign the oath for the good of the people. However, the day after Bell's visit, two settlers were found killed in nearby Ramarama, and some Crown officials suspected Takaanini as the culprit, although no evidence of this was ever found. Due to these suspicions, on 16 July 1863, Takaanini and 22 other Te Ākitai members, including his wife, three of his children, and his elderly father, were arrested by Crown officials under the order of George Grey, without charge or evidence, and taken to Drury. These arrests were considered lawful due to the recent passing of the Suppression of Rebellion Act 1863, which allowed for indefinite imprisonment without trial for Māori suspected of disloyalty towards the Queen. As Takaanini had neither declared his loyalty to the Queen, nor fled to the Waikato, he and his relatives met these conditions. Ministers later admitted there was no actual legal basis for his imprisonment. From Drury they were moved to Camp Ōtahuhu, where two of Takaanini's children, both daughters, and his father Pepene Te Tihi, would die.

=== Rākino Island and death ===
In 1863, Takaanini and the other imprisoned Te Ākitai individuals were moved to Rākino Island, a small island in the Hauraki Gulf that was purchased by Governor George Grey in 1862. The date of Takaanini's death is unknown, but it was reported that he died on Rākino Island in early 1864, supposedly of homesickness and a broken heart. His body has yet to be retrieved or returned to Te Ākitai Waiohua, and this is an issue that Te Ākitai Waiohua is continuously seeking to remedy.
