= Tūtira Mai Ngā Iwi =

New Zealand Māori folk song

Song
- Language: Māori
- Written: 1950s
- Genre: folk music
- Songwriter: Canon Wiremu Te Tau Huata

"Tūtira Mai Ngā Iwi", or "Tūtira Mai", is a New Zealand Māori folk song (or waiata) written in the 1950s by Canon Wiremu Te Tau Huata. The song became popular after being selected by New Zealand's Ministry of Education for inclusion in schoolbooks.

== History ==
Huata wrote "Tūtira Mai Ngā Iwi" while part of an Ecumenical Movement in the late 1950s. He was driving from Wairoa, Hawke's Bay with his children and passed Lake Tūtira. He would sing the lyrics and his children would repeat them, learning it as they drove to Napier. The waiata eventually grew in popularity through Huata performing it in churches and Bible classes. By the 1960s, the New Zealand government's Ministry of Education picked up the waiata and started publishing it for use in New Zealand's schools without Huata's consent and didn't credit him as the author. As a result after 50 years of being used in schools, his daughter revealed that some of the lyrics were published incorrectly. On 28 May 2020 the song was published on YouTube, performed by members of the navy, army and airforce bands in a musical partnership between the New Zealand and United States armed forces. The song's composer was Wiremu Te Tau Huata who was a New Zealand military chaplain to the 28th Maori Battalion. His whānau gave permission for the waiata to be used.

== Meaning ==
While there is some conjecture about the exact words in the song (a situation matching that of many older folk songs worldwide) there is general agreement that it is a song of unity, with the repeated refrain of "tātou tātou e" ( "all of us, all of us"). The song is often used by New Zealanders in times when standing together and supporting each other is appropriate. The song was, for example, used to show support with the New Zealand Muslim community after the Christchurch mosque shootings.

== Rugby ==
In 2017, the New Zealand Rugby Union started a campaign for the 2017 British and Irish Lions tour for New Zealand national rugby union team fans to adopt "Tūtira Mai Ngā Iwi" as a rallying chant to try to out-sing the British and Irish Lions fans. The campaign was led by the New Zealand Police constable and former All Black Glen Osborne. However the attempt was poorly received by All Blacks fans. The Lions fans also hijacked the song changing the chorus from "Tatou, Tatou" to "Lions, Lions". A New Zealand sports writer criticised the NZRU for attempting to manufacture a favourable atmosphere, believing that "Tūtira Mai Ngā Iwi" was an inappropriate choice.

On 12 November 2022, in Eden Park, Auckland, a member of the Black Ferns women's Rugby team, Ruby Tui, led the crowd in singing "Tūtira Mai Ngā Iwi" to celebrate their 34-31 World Cup final win over England.
