= Te Āti Awa =

Māori iwi (tribe) in Aotearoa New Zealand

- Iwi (tribe) in Māoridom
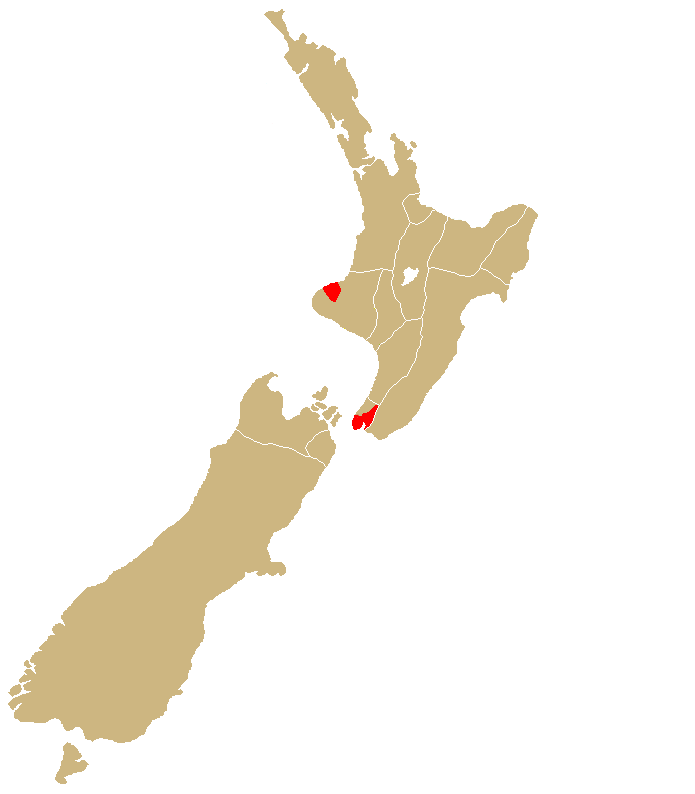
- Rohe (region): Taranaki and Wellington
- Waka (canoe): Tokomaru, Aotea
- Population: 15,270

Te Āti Awa or Te Ātiawa is a Māori iwi (tribe) with traditional bases in the Taranaki and Wellington regions of New Zealand. Approximately 17,000 people registered their affiliation to Te Āti Awa in 2001, with about 10,000 in Taranaki, 2,000 in Wellington and 5,000 of unspecified regional location.

== Geographical landmarks ==
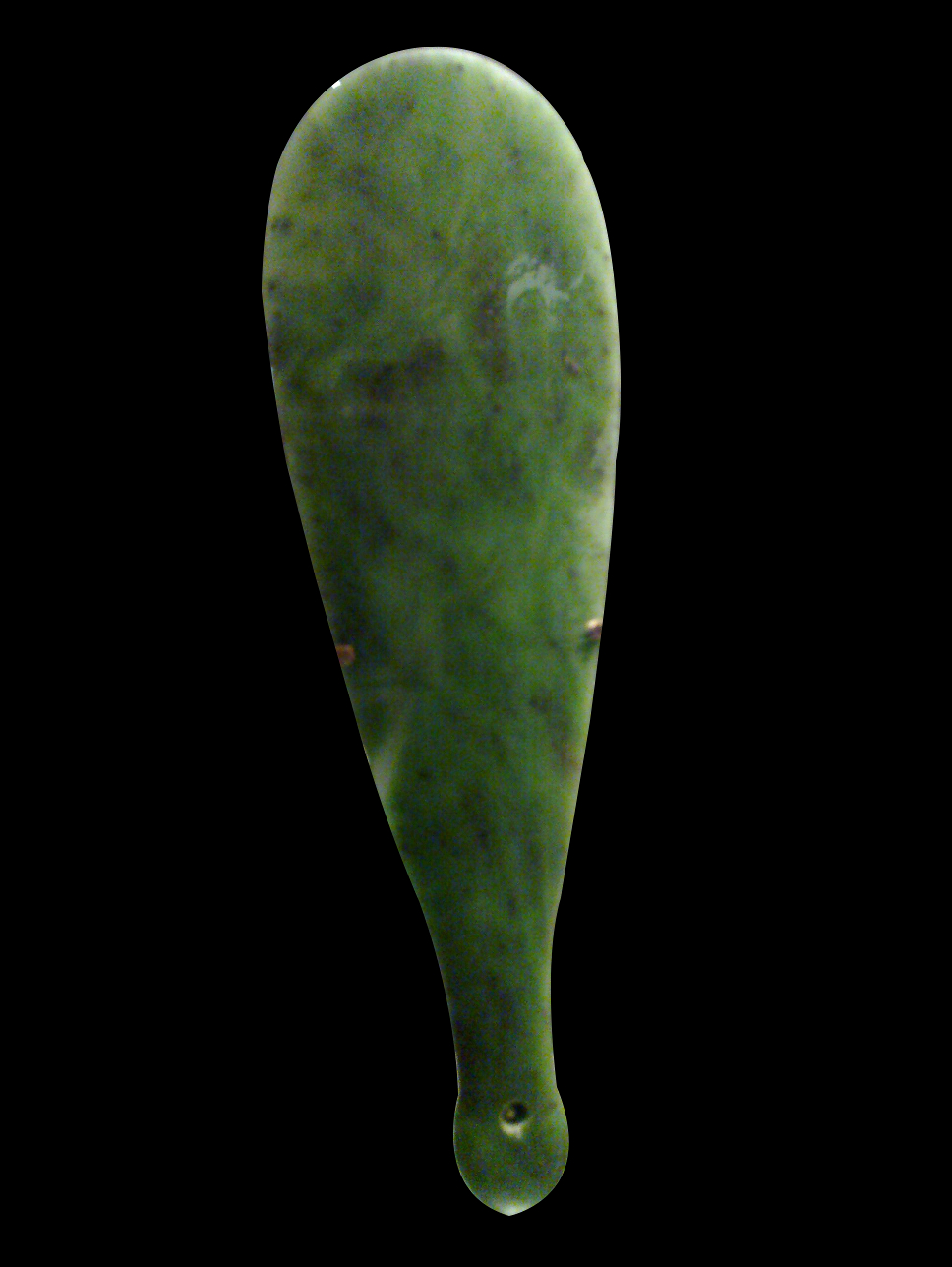
Kataore, a mere pounamu (42cm x 12cm) named after a Ngāi Tahu chief killed by Te Rauparaha in the 1830s. Gifted by Riwai Keioni Te Ahu of Te Āti Awa to Sir George Grey. Currently loaned to the Auckland War Memorial Museum, New Zealand.

Te Āti Awa recognise Taranaki as their ancestral homeland. Mount Taranaki dominates the regional landscape, and many of the eight local iwi, including Te Āti Awa, regard it as sacred. The iwi also maintains a cultural association with several waterways in Taranaki, including Wai-o-ngana, Waiwakaiho, and the Waitara River. Historical lands in the Wellington region include the Hutt River delta and Lowry Bay (Eastbourne); and Waikawa, Motueka and Golden Bay in the South Island.

== History ==
=== Foundations ===
Te Awanuiarangi is recognised as the founding ancestor of Te Āti Awa. According to Te Āti Awa traditions, he was the product of a union between Rongoueroa and Tamarau, a spirit ancestor. Awanuiarangi is also an ancestor of Ngāti Awa in the Bay of Plenty. However, while Ngāti Awa trace their ancestry to the Mātaatua canoe, some Te Āti Awa trace their origins to the Tokomaru canoe whilst others remember the connection to the Kaahui people or the people that walked in the region before the floods. Whilst Manaia and the other three captains of Tokomaru are recognized, the whakapapa for the Kaahui people is clearly of older stock as can be seen in the carved house and principal marae of Te Atiawa.

Te Awanuiarangi was known to have been born in Taranaki, around the Waiongana area, a region where some of the Kaahui people lived. After Toi-Kairākau, Ruarangi and Rauru left with Toroa and the then budding Wairaka. The story continues that, in several North Island traditions, Awanuiarangi originally settled in the Northland region, but migrated southwards with his people following disputes with other northern iwi. Some migrants settled in the Bay of Plenty, some of whom gave rise to the Ngāti Awa iwi. Others settled in Taranaki, some of whom formed Te Āti Awa. As for the ones that returned home from their sojourn around the country (Te Awanuiarangi included), they were welcomed back to their original homeland in Taranaki with open arms.

=== Warfare and migration ===
Māori acquisition of muskets in the early 19th century saw a marked increase in tribal war campaigns. In 1819, Ngā Puhi began a campaign of conquest throughout the North Island, newly equipped with muskets brought from Sydney. Partly due to tensions with northern Waikato iwi, Te Āti Awa and other Taranaki iwi joined forces with Ngā Puhi. Armed with muskets, Te Āti Awa forces battled the Waikato iwi. Despite a decisive victory at Motunui in 1822, the Waikato forces eventually threatened to overtake Taranaki. This precipitated the first of four major migrations southwards.

1. Te Heke Tātaramoa. The first migration from Taranaki comprised people from Ngāti Toa, Ngāti Tama, Ngāti Mutunga and Te Āti Awa, all fleeing the potential threat of the Waikato forces. This first group migrated to the Kapiti Coast.
2. Te Heke Nihoputa. A second migration from Taranaki occurred around 1824, including Ngāti Mutunga, Ngāti Tama and Te Āti Awa. These migrants settled in the area around Wellington Harbour. In Wellington traditions, Rongoueroa married Ruarangi, son of noted Polynesian explorer Toi. Her grandson was Tara, who lent his name to the area of Wellington Harbour, which became Te Whanganui-a-Tara ("the great harbour of Tara").
3. Te Heke Tamateuaua. In retaliation for the defeat at Motunui, Waikato and Ngāti Maniapoto forces combined and invaded the Taranaki region, eventually reaching the Ngāmotu people of Te Āti Awa. In 1832, considerable numbers of Ngāmotu moved south to Wellington, joined by some Ngāti Tama, settling at Petone with a hapu of Ngāti Mutunga, who had arrived in a previous migration. In gratitude for avenging the death of one of their leaders, Ngāti Mutunga gifted the area around the Hutt River delta and Lowry Bay to the Ngāmotu people. From this time Waikato Tainui claimed mana whenua over Te Āti Awa's Taranaki homeland.
4. Te Heke Paukena and the Kūititanga Battle. A fourth migration from Taranaki took place in 1834, after a battle with Ngāti Toa. This preceded the breakdown of relations between tribal settlements on the Kapiti Coast, and in 1835 Ngāti Mutunga and sections of Ngāti Tama transferred control of their lands to Te Āti Awa and other Taranaki tribes when they left to invade and settle the Chatham Islands. In 1839, Ngāti Raukawa, who were fairly recent arrivals to the Wellington region, attacked Te Āti Awa settlements along Wellington Harbour, with support from Ngāti Toa.

=== Arrival of European settlers ===
In that same year, newly arrived English settlers brought increased demand for land around the Wellington area. The New Zealand Company initially bought some land from local Māori tribes; some of these land purchases would later come into dispute. A later practice saw deeds obtained from local Māori tribes allowing for the reservation of one-tenth of land for Māori use, or in exchange for land elsewhere.

European settlements began to encroach on ancestral Taranaki lands in 1841. This led to a migration of some Wellington Te Āti Awa back to Taranaki in 1848, led by Wiremu Kīngi Te Rangitāke, who opposed the sale of tribal lands to European settlers. Conflicts over land sales arose between various sub-tribes and with European settlers. In 1860, Kīngi refused an ultimatum from Crown troops to vacate his land after it was offered to the Crown by another chief. This led to the first shots of the New Zealand Wars.

=== New Zealand Wars ===
Te Āti Awa in Taranaki received widespread support from other Māori, including warriors from the Māori King Movement, in their battle with the Crown, but after a strong year of fighting were ultimately defeated due to the Crown being able to bring in fighters from Australia. Under the New Zealand Settlements Act 1863 and the Suppression of Rebellion Act 1863 (which the Crown enacted only directly after the war), Te Āti Awa were branded "rebels" and the Crown confiscated almost 485,000 hectares (1,200,000 acres) of their land in Taranaki. This severely undermined the political and social structures of the iwi and revealed the deceptive nature of the oppressive Crown colonial entities. To this day Te Ati Awa have not had their land returned. At least 12 members of Te Āti Awa died during the First Taranaki War.

=== Government redress ===
The 20th century saw several attempts by the New Zealand Government to redress past actions towards Te Āti Awa. This included recommendations for a settlement monetary sum; a figure was eventually reached by the Government, but without consultation with Taranaki tribes. The Taranaki Maori Claims Act of 1944 also indicated an early full settlement between the Crown and local tribes, but this was disputed by various Taranaki iwi. The Waitangi Tribunal reported on Taranaki claims in 1996.

==== Taranaki claims ====
Te Āti Awa in Taranaki and the Crown signed a Heads of Agreement in 1999, which sets out a broad agreement in anticipation of developing a formal, legally binding Deed of Settlement. The Heads of Agreement indicates a public apology for land confiscations in Taranaki, recognition of cultural associations with sacred geographical landmarks and land areas, restoration of tribal access to traditional food gathering areas, monetary compensation totalling NZ$34 million and commercial redress for economic loss due to land confiscation. The Agreement covers claims made by Te Āti Awa in Taranaki.

In 2004, the New Plymouth District Council resolved to sell 146 ha of land at Waitara to the Crown on condition that it was used in settlement of Te Atiawa claims under the Treaty of Waitangi. Leaseholders mounted unsuccessful legal opposition in 2008 and 2011.

==== Wellington claims ====
In 1977, the Wellington Tenths Trust was established, representing Te Āti Awa land owners in Wellington. The Trust lodged claims with the Waitangi Tribunal over disputed land ownership purchases from 1839, and the Tribunal issued its findings on these claims in 2003, along with those of other iwi in the Wellington region. The Crown and Taranaki Whānui ki Te Upoko o Te Ika, a collective that comprises people from Te Āti Awa and other Taranaki iwi whose ancestors migrated to Wellington, signed a Deed of Settlement in 2008 that settled those claims.

== Te Āti Awa today ==
Te Āti Awa in Taranaki and Wellington maintain strong connections with each other; close ties are also maintained with distantly related Ngāti Awa. As an iwi, Te Āti Awa continue to seek redress for past injustices. Organisations are established in Taranaki and Wellington that represent the political and economic interests of the iwi.

Atiawa Toa FM is the official radio station of Te Āti Awa and Ngāti Toa in the lower North Island. It began as Atiawa FM in 1993, broadcasting to Te Āti Awa in the Hutt Valley and Wellington. It changed its name in Atiawa Toa FM in mid-1997, expanding its reach to Ngāti Toa in Porirua and Kapiti Coast. The station is based in Lower Hutt, and is available on 96.9 FM in Hutt Valley and Wellington, and on 94.9 FM in Porirua.

Te Korimako O Taranaki is the radio station of Te Āti Awa in Taranaki. It is also affiliated with other Taranaki region iwi, including Ngāti Tama, Ngāti Mutunga, Ngāti Maru, Taranaki, Ngāruahine, Ngāti Ruanui, and Ngā Rauru Kītahi. It started at the Bell Block campus of Taranaki Polytechnic in 1992, and moved to the Spotswood campus in 1993. It is available on 94.8 FM across Taranaki.

== Notable Te Āti Awa ==
- Marlene J Bennetts
- Leo Bertos
- Rachel Buchanan
- William Carran
- Jacob Ellison
- Riki Ellison
- Rhett Ellison
- Thomas Ellison
- Tamati Ellison
- Tohu Kākahi
- Christine Kenney
- Wiremu Kīngi Te Rangitāke
- Christine Harvey
- Sir Ngātata Love
- Sir Ralph Love
- Kayla McAlister
- Luke McAlister
- Leonie Pihama
- Sir Paul Reeves
- Curtis Rona
- Te Whiti o Rongomai
- Howie Tamati
- Kevin Tamati
- Hana Te Hemara
- Kahe Te Rau-o-te-rangi

== See also ==
- List of Māori iwi
