= Suppression of Rebellion Act 1863 =

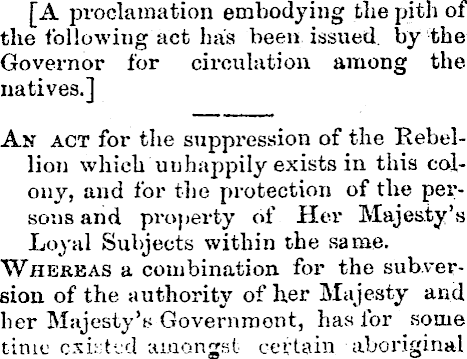
Suppression of Rebellion Act 1863, Wanganui Chronicle newspaper article

The Suppression of Rebellion Act 1863 is a piece of New Zealand legislation, passed in 1863, which greatly increased the punitive actions allowed against Māori, including execution and penal servitude, by those authorised by the New Zealand Governor. Passed on the same day as the New Zealand Settlements Act 1863, the Suppression of Rebellion Act was passed in response to Māori rebelling against the New Zealand Government's seizure of land throughout the New Zealand Wars.
