= Timeline of Auckland =

This is a timeline of the history of the city of Auckland in New Zealand.

== 13th century ==
- c. 13th century – Estimated date for first Māori arrivals in the Auckland area. Oral histories tell of the legendary explorer Kupe visiting Paratutae Island.

== 14th century ==
- c. 14th century
  - Earliest known archaeological evidence of settlements around the Manukau Harbour, including Ihumātao and Puhinui.
  - Estimated date for the arrival of the Tainui and Arawa migratory waka. The Tainui was hauled over Te Tō Waka, the portage at Ōtāhuhu between the east and west coasts. Rakataura, tohunga of the Tainui waka, travelled the area and named many of the features (including Karangahape Road).

== 16th century ==
- c. 1500 – Eruption of Rangitoto Island. This is the most recent volcanic activity seen in the Auckland volcanic field.

== 17th century ==
- c. 1600 – The rangatira Maki migrates north from the Kawhia Harbour, assisting Ngāti Awa relatives to conquer and unify Tāmaki Māori peoples. Maki settles near the Kaipara River mouth, and his children settle along the west coast and northern Auckland, creating the tribal identities including Te Kawerau ā Maki, Ngāti Manuhiri and Ngāti Kahu.
- c. 1640 – Ngāti Whatua begin settling the south Kaipara Harbour area.
- c. 1650 – Three major Tāmaki Māori tribes, Ngā Iwi, Ngā Oho and Ngā Riki unify under rangatira Huakaiwaka, forming the Waiohua confederation. Waiohua develop the Auckland isthmus, creating gardens and large settlements, focused at Maungawhau and later Maungakiekie.
- c. 1680 – Waikato Tainui warrior Kawharu arrives in the Tāmaki area, raiding settlements on behalf of Ngāti Whatua, including West Auckland and South Auckland. Te Kawerau ā Maki refer to these events as Te Raupatu Tīhore ("The Stripping Conquest"). Peace is forged between Ngāti Whātua and Maki's grandson Te Au o Te Whenua.

== 18th century ==
- c. 1700 – Marutūāhu iwi including Ngāti Paoa expand their influence to include the islands of the Hauraki Gulf and the North Shore.
- c. 1741
  - Kiwi Tāmaki, paramount chief of Waiohua, is defeated in battle at Paruroa (Big Muddy Creek) by Ngāti Whatua, led by the hapū Te Taoū.
  - Siege of Māngere Mountain.
- c. 1750 – Conflict arises between Ngāti Pāoa and the people of the northwestern Hauraki Gulf, in order to secure shark fishing rights along the Mahurangi coast.
- 1769 – Captain James Cook visits the Hauraki Gulf in November, during which he gifts some of the first potato plants grown in New Zealand while visiting the Wairoa River.
- c. 1780 – Te Tahuri, chieftainess of Te Taou, gifts land on the western shore of the Tāmaki River to Ngāti Pāoa, who settle at Mokoia (modern day Panmure). Within a generation, Ngāti Pāoa almost outnumber Ngāti Whātua living on the Auckland isthmus.
- c. 1790
  - Peace is reached between Ngāti Pāoa and other Tāmaki Māori, after numerous skirmishes to secure shark fishing rights.
  - Ngāti Pāoa begin repairing European whaling ships on Waiheke Island.
- 1793 – Early European contact leads to an outbreak of respiratory diseases (rewharewha) among Tāmaki Māori, causing significant deaths.
- c. 1795 – Tuperiri, chief of Ngāti Whatua dies. after this point, Ngāti Whatua of the Auckland isthmus move their focus of settlement from Maungakiekie / One Tree Hill to the Onehunga and Māngere Mountain areas.

== 19th century ==
- 1810 – Respiratory disease outbreak among Tāmaki Māori.
- 1820 – Missionary Samuel Marsden visits the Auckland area. Marsden climbed Mount Wellington / Maungarei in July 1820, and visited the Manukau Harbour in November.
- 1821
  - Missionary William Colenso visits the Auckland area in late 1821 / early 1842.
  - During the Musket Wars, a Ngāpuhi war party led by Hongi Hika attacks the Tāmaki settlements including Mokoia village on the Tāmaki River.
- c. 1821 – During the Musket Wars, most Tāmaki Māori flee the Auckland area, seeking temporary refuge in the northern Waikato and Northland. Small numbers of warriors remain to maintain ahi kaa (claim to land).
- 1825 – the battle at Te Ika a Ranganui during the Musket Wars causes numerous deaths.
- 1827 – Explorer Jules Dumont d'Urville visits the Auckland area, surveying the Hauraki Gulf. d'Urville anchors the Astrolabe at Torpedo Bay, Devonport.
- 1832 – Gordon Browne establishes the kauri spar station on the Pukapuka Peninsula of the Mahurangi Harbour.
- c. 1835 – Tāmaki Māori resettle the area.
- 1835 – Thomas Mitchell settles at Cornwallis, first European settlement on the Manukau Harbour. By 1839 land plots for the settlement are being sold, and the first settlers arrive on the Brilliant circa 1840. The settlement collapsed by 1843, with many people moving to Onehunga.
- 1836 – William Thomas Fairburn organises the Fairburn purchase, a private land sale covering the area between Ōtāhuhu, Papakura and the Wairoa River.
- 1837 – Fairburn establishes the Maraetai Mission Station.
- 1840
  - Ngāti Whātua chief Apihai Te Kawau signs the Treaty of Waitangi at Ōrua Bay on the Manukau Harbour on 20 March 1840.
  - Apihai Te Kawau moves the majority of Ngāti Whātua of the Tāmaki area from Onehunga-Māngere to Remuera-Ōrākei in the winter of 1840.
  - Auckland founded.
- 1841
  - St Paul's founded, Auckland's first church.
  - Mr Powell's School founded, Auckland's first school.
- 1842
  - Auckland designated capital of New Zealand.
  - Immigrant ships Duchess of Argyle and Jane Gifford arrive from Greenock, Scotland.
  - Mechanics' Institute and Library opens.
  - Population: 2,895.
- 1843
  - Southern Cross newspaper begins publication.
  - Queen Street gravelled.
  - Auckland Domain laid out.
- 1844 – May: Maori Festival held.
- 1846 – The Ihumātao Mission Station is established by the Wesleyan Methodist Church.
- 1847 – First fencible settlers arrive.
- 1848 – St Patrick's Cathedral built.
- 1849 – St Barnabas Church built, Auckland's first Māori church.
- 1850 – St Andrew's Church built.
- 1855 – Auckland Choral Society founded.
- 1857 – St Peter's School established.
- 1860 – Old St Mary's built.
- 1861
  - Population: 7,989.
  - Great South Road construction commenced.
- 1863
  - The New Zealand Herald begins publication.
  - Invasion of the Waikato commenced. Governor Grey's 9 July 1863 proclamation that all South Auckland Māori are required to leave or swear loyalty to the Queen causes a mass exodus of Māori to the Waikato.
- 1864 – Population: 12,423.
- 1865
  - New Zealand capital relocated from Auckland to Wellington.
  - Original St Sepulchre's built.
- 1868 – Auckland Institute incorporated.
- 1869 – First Royal Tour – the Prince Alfred, the Duke of Edinburgh.
- 1870 – Evening Star newspaper begins publication.
- 1871
  - Auckland City Council established.
  - Philip Philips becomes first mayor.
  - Auckland Harbour Board established.
- 1873
  - Onehunga Branch railway begins operating.
  - New City Markets opens.
- 1874 – Ellerslie Racecourse laid out.
- 1880 Church of the Holy Sepulchre founded.
- 1881
  - Population: 16,664.
  - Auckland Teachers' Training College established.
- 1883 – Auckland University College founded.
- 1884 – Horse-drawn trams begin operating.
- 1885 – Newmarket becomes a borough.
- 1885 – Old St Paul's Church demolished.
- 1886
  - Population: 33,161.
  - Devonport becomes a borough.
- 1887
  - Public Library opens.
  - Auckland Sailors' Home built.
- 1888
  - St Mary's Cathedral built.
  - Art Gallery opens.
  - Birkenhead, New Zealand becomes a borough.
- 1890 – Elam School of Fine Arts founded.
- 1894 – Current St Paul's Church dedicated.
- 1895 – Auckland Technical School founded.
- 1896 – 13 October: First motion pictures screened in New Zealand shown at the Wellesley Street Opera House as part of Charles Godfrey's Vaudeville.
- 1898 – Old Colonists' Association meetings begin.
- 1899 – Great Barrier Island–Auckland pigeon post begins operating.

== 20th century ==
- 1901 – Grand Hotel Fire.
- 1901 – Royal Tour – The Duke & Duchess of Cornwall. The Mayor, Dr John Logan Campbell donates Cornwall Park to the city.
- 1902 – Electric tram system installed.
- 1905 – Victoria Park opens.
- 1906 – Mount Eden becomes a borough
- 1908 – St Patrick's Cathedral dedicated. North Island Main Trunk railway opened. Northcote becomes a borough.
- 1909 – Auckland Girl's Grammar School moves to Howe Street, Freeman's Bay.
- 1910 – Grafton Bridge and Kings Theatre built.
- 1911 – Mount Albert becomes a borough
  - Auckland Town Hall built.
  - Population: 40,536.
- 1912 – Auckland Ferry Terminal built. Otahuhu becomes a borough
- 1913 – 1913 Great Strike. Takapuna becomes a borough. Municipal Coal fired Electricity Power Station on King's Wharf completed and opened February. Auckland Industrial Exhibition held in Auckland Domain over summer 1913/1914.
- 1914 – Start of World War I
- 1915 – Auckland Presbyterian College for Ladies established in Epsom
- 1915 – Myers Park opened.
- 1916 – Myers Free Kindergarten building opened. Auckland grammar School moves to Mt Eden.
  - Old Colonists' Museum opens.
  - Population: 64,951.
- 1917 – Mount Eden Prison completed
- 1918 – End of World War I
- 1920 – Auckland City Mission established.
- 1920 – Royal Tour – the Prince Edward, Prince of Wales.
- 1921 – Population: 83,467.
- 1922 – Auckland Zoo opens.
- 1923 – Underground railway proposed.
- 1925 – North Auckland Line opened
- 1925 – Royal Tour – The Duke & Duchess of York.
- 1927 – Dilworth Building constructed.
- 1927 – Underground Railway project announced.
- 1928 – St. James Theatre opens.
- 1929 – Auckland Civic Theatre and Auckland War Memorial Museum inaugurated.
- 1930
  - Auckland Railway Station opens. One Tree Hill becomes a borough
  - Eastern Line railway begins operating.
- 1932 – Unemployed riot on Queen Street.
- 1938 – Royal Tour, the Duke & Duchess of Gloucester.
- 1939 – St Peter's College established in Grafton. World War II started.
- 1944 – New Central Fire Station opened.
- 1945 – World War II ended
- 1947 – Mount Roskill becomes a borough
- 1949 – First trolley bus services ran
- 1950 – February: 1950 British Empire Games held.
- 1951 – 1951 New Zealand waterfront dispute
- 1952 – Mount Wellington becomes a borough. First section of Northwestern Motorway opened
- 1953 – First royal visit by a monarch – Queen Elizabeth II – Xmas broadcast from Government House Auckland.
- 1953 – First section of Auckland Southern Motorway opened from Ellerslie-Panmure highway to Mount Wellington Highway. Hunua dams completed
- 1954 – East Coast Bays becomes a borough
- 1955 – Auckland Southern Motorway opened to Wiri
- 1956 – Last tram ran in Auckland
- 1959 – Auckland Harbour Bridge built. First section of Auckland Northern Motorway opened
- 1960 – Mangere sewage treatment plant opened
- 1961 – Alcan Industries aluminium plant and Vibrapac concrete block plant both established at Wiri
- 1962 – Victoria Park Viaduct opens. Nestleinstant coffee factory opened in South Auckland
- 1963 – Auckland Southern Motorway opened to Takanini
- 1964 – Auckland Regional Authority founded. The Beatles played a concert at Auckland
- 1965 – Manurewa Borough amalgamated with Manukau County to form Manukau City. Fibremakers nylon yarn factory opened in South Auckland
- 1966 – Auckland Airport and Newmarket Viaduct open.
- 1967
  - Auckland Observatory founded.
  - Mount Smart Stadium opens in Penrose.
- 1968 – Auckland InterContinental hotel opened. Paremoremo Prison opened.
- 1969 – Auckland Rapid Rail Transit proposed
- 1970 – Auckland Opera founded.
- 1971 – Sister city relationship established with Los Angeles, USA.
- 1972 – Air New Zealand House (now HSBC Building) opened. Dalgety's wool store (the largest in the Southern Hemisphere) opened in South Auckland
- 1973 – Ford car assembly plant opened in Wiri
- 1974 – National Mutual (now Axa) West Plaza opened. First Manukau City Centre building, the Wiri Trust Hotel opened
- 1976 – Auckland Rapid Rail Transit proposal abandoned. Manukau City Centre Mall's first stage opened. NZ Labour Department office opened in Manukau City Centre
- 1977 – Manukau City Council administration building opened
- 1979 – Housing New Zealand building opened at Manukau City Centre
- 1980 – Auckland Philharmonia Orchestra formed. Last trolley bus ran
- 1982 – Rainbows End theme park opened
- 1983
  - New Mangere Bridge built. First section of Southwestern Motorway opened.
  - Catherine Tizard becomes first woman mayor of Auckland.
- 1986 – Manukau Court building opened
- 1987 – Newstalk ZB radio begins.
- 1989 – Auckland local bodies amalgamated to form Auckland City, North Shore City, Waitakere City, Manukau City Cities and Papakura District, Rodney District and Franklin District. Auckland Regional Authority renamed Auckland Regional Council
- 1990
  - January–February: 1990 Commonwealth Games held.
  - Aotea Centre opens.
- 1991
  - Starship Children's Health opens.
  - Renaissance Centre built in Manukau.
  - ANZ Centre completed.
- 1993 – 26 November: Two aircraft being operated for the police collided over central Auckland.
- 1996 – Skycity Auckland casino opens.
- 1997 – Sky Tower built.
- 1998
  - February–March: Electrical power crisis.
  - Cycle Action Auckland founded.
- 1999 – Metropolis apartment building completed.
- 2000
  - Auckland Institute of Technology becomes Auckland University of Technology.
  - Vero Centre office tower completed.
  - Yachting's America's Cup contested.

== 21st century ==
- 2003
  - Britomart Transport Centre opens.
  - New main Auckland City Hospital building completed.
  - Yachting's America's Cup contested in Auckland for the second time.
- 2004
  - Northwestern Cycleway laid out.
  - Auckland Regional Transport Authority established.
- 2006 – 12 June: Electrical blackout for half of Auckland.
- 2010
  - Auckland Council established for Auckland Region.
  - New stands completed at Eden Park, expanding permanent capacity to 50,000.
  - Population: 1,486,000.
- 2011: Several matches of the 2011 Rugby World Cup, including the final, held at Eden Park.
- 2012
  - Jacobs Ladder Bridge for pedestrians at Saint Marys Bay opens.
  - Victoria Park Tunnel built.
- 2014 – Electric train services commence.
- 2019 – The Skycity Convention Centre catches fire on 22 October while still under construction, causing significant disruption in the CBD.
- 2023 – Auckland Anniversary Weekend floods: Torrential rain causes widespread flooding, evacuations and damage across Auckland and four deaths.

== See also ==
- History of Auckland
- Mayor of Auckland City (1871–2010)
- Timeline of New Zealand history

== Bibliography ==
Published in the 19th century

- "Auckland City", Brett's New Zealand and South Pacific Pilot, Auckland, N.Z: Printed by H. Brett, 1880
- "Auckland", New Zealand Handbook (14th ed.), London: E. Stanford, 1879
- Maturin Murray Ballou (1888), "(Auckland)", Under the Southern Cross, or Travels in Australia, Tasmania, New Zealand, Samoa, and other Pacific islands, Boston: Ticknor and Co.
- John Murray Moore (1890), "Auckland, the Naples of New Zealand", New Zealand, London: Sampson Low, Marston, Searle, & Rivington
- William Gisborne (1891), "(Auckland)", The Colony of New Zealand, London: E.A. Petherick & Co., OCLC 8597509
- "Auckland", Pictorial New Zealand, London: Cassell and Co., 1895, OCLC 8587586, OL 7088023M

Published in the 20th century

- Bush, Graham W. A. (2006). The History of Epsom. Auckland: Epsom & Eden District Historical Society Inc. ISBN 0-473-11102-0.
- "Auckland", New Zealand as a Tourist and Health Resort, Auckland: T. Cook & Son, 1902, OCLC 18158487
- "Auckland" . Encyclopædia Britannica. Vol. 2 (11th ed.). 1910. p. 894.
- C. N. Baeyertz (1912), "Auckland", Guide to New Zealand, Wellington: New Zealand Times Co., OCLC 5747830
- John Barr (1922), City of Auckland, New Zealand, 1840–1920, Auckland: Whitcombe & Tombs, OL 24364862M
- Diamond, John T.; Hayward, Bruce W. (1979). The Māori history and legends of the Waitākere Ranges. The Lodestar Press. ISBN 9781877431210.
- Mackintosh, Lucy (2021). Shifting Grounds: Deep Histories of Tāmaki Makaurau Auckland. Bridget Williams Books. doi:10.7810/9781988587332. ISBN 978-1-988587-33-2.
- Murdoch, Graeme (1990). "Nga Tohu o Waitakere: the Maori Place Names of the Waitakere River Valley and its Environs; their Background History and an Explanation of their Meaning". In Northcote-Bade, James (ed.). West Auckland Remembers. Vol. 1. West Auckland Historical Society. pp. 9–32. ISBN 0-473-00983-8.
- Paterson, Malcolm (2009). "Ko Ngā Kurī Purepure o Tāmaki, e Kore e Ngari i te Pō". In Macdonald, Finlay; Kerr, Ruth (eds.). West: The History of Waitakere. Random House. pp. 49–62. ISBN 9781869790080.
- Stone, R. C. J. (2001). From Tamaki-makau-rau to Auckland. Auckland University Press. ISBN 1869402596.
- Taua, Te Warena (2009). "He Kohikohinga Kōrero mō Hikurangi". In Macdonald, Finlay; Kerr, Ruth (eds.). West: The History of Waitakere. Random House. pp. 23–48. ISBN 9781869790080.
