= Puhinui Craters =

Coordinates: 37°00′53″S 174°49′59″E

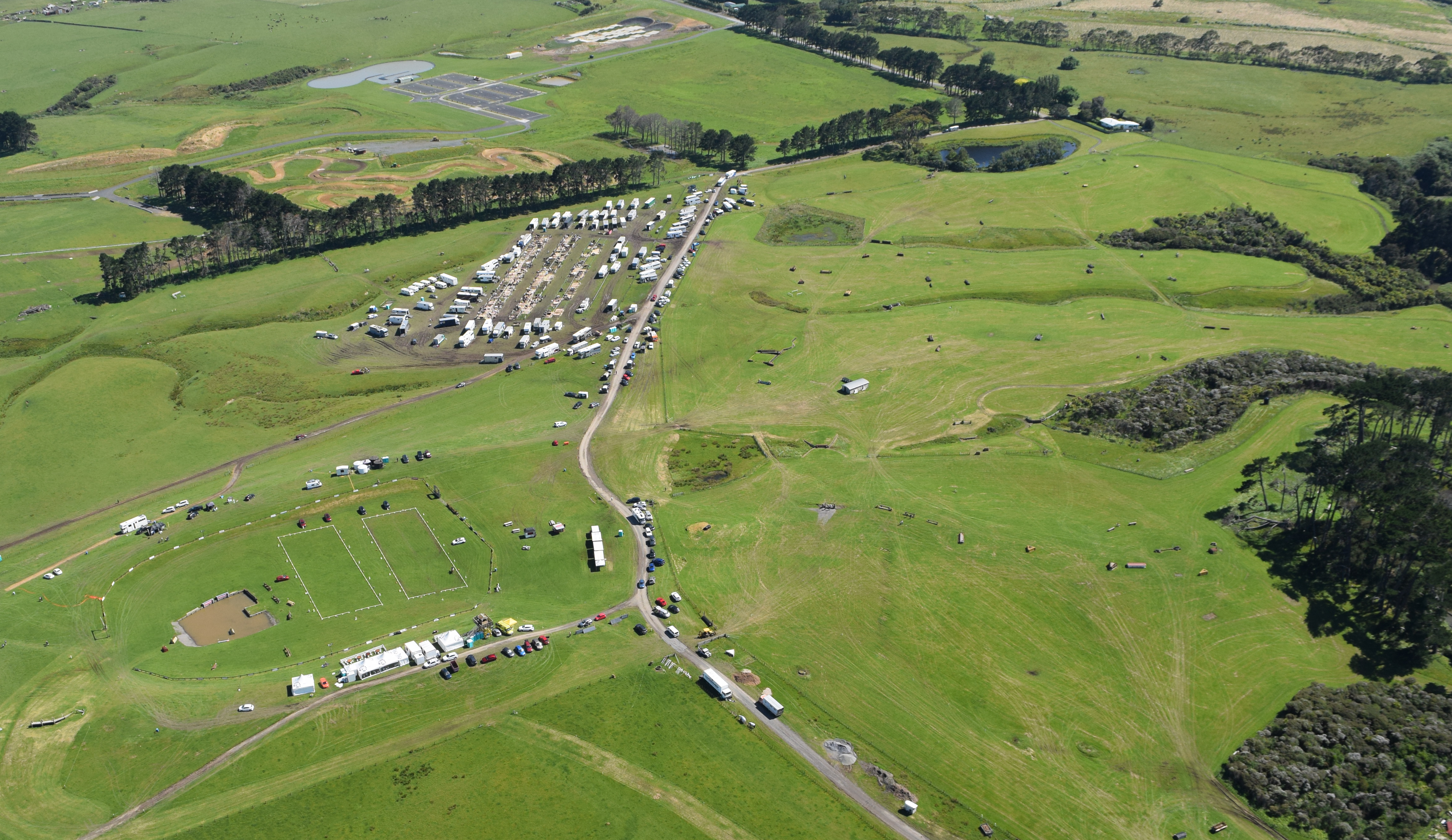
- Oblique aerial photo, 2018

Highest point
- Elevation: 21.5–22 m

Geography
- Location: Puhinui Reserve, Wiri, Auckland Council, New Zealand

Geology
- Rock age: Likely 50,000 years
- Mountain type: Maar
- Volcanic field: Auckland volcanic field

The Puhinui Craters are located in Auckland's Puhinui Reserve and are part of the Auckland volcanic field in the North Island of New Zealand. They were first recognised as volcanic craters in 2011. A cluster of three small maar craters like these is unique in the Auckland volcanic field. Their ages are unknown but most probably all three erupted during the same eruptive episode. They could have been associated with the eruption of nearby Matukutureia (also known as McLaughlin's Mountain) but this is speculation at present.

The cluster is composed of three maars, encircled by tuff cones that over tens of thousands of years have been partly breached and eroded by runoff from the small freshwater lakes appearing in the craters shortly after the eruption. Due to the maars' very gentle rise over the otherwise level terrace of Pleistocene age, their volcanic origin had not been recognised earlier.

Puhinui Pond Crater, located near the reserve entrance, contains a farm pond. The crater is 200 m × 150 m (660 ft × 490 ft) across and the nearly complete surrounding tuff cone rim rises 1.5–2 m (4.9–6.6 ft) above the pond.

Puhinui Arena Crater is breached on both the west and east sides. It is 250 m × 150 m (820 ft × 490 ft) across and its drained and sediment-filled flat floor is 2–2.5 m (6.6–8.2 ft) below the rim of the surrounding tuff ring.

Puhinui Eroded Crater lies directly east of Arena Crater on the route of the small stream that drains the latter. Eroded Crater is breached at both west and east ends and its tuff cone partly eroded by the adjacent Puhinui Creek. It is less well-preserved than the other two craters but of similar size.
