= Motukoreaite =

Mineral

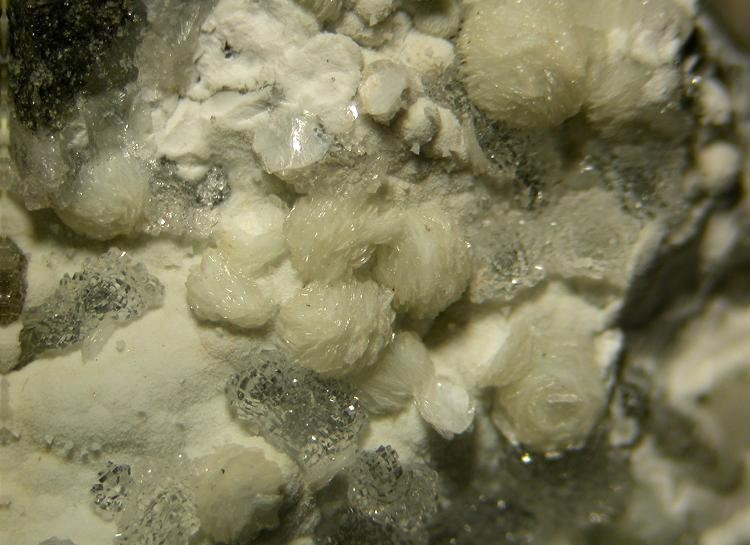
- Yellow-white balls of motukoreaite held together by phillipsite

General
- Category: Sulfate and Carbonate mineral
- Formula: Mg_{6}Al_{3}(OH)_{18}[Na(H_{2}O)_{6}](SO_{4})_{2}·6H_{2}O (possibly more than one species)
- IMA symbol: Mtu
- Strunz classification: 7.DD.35
- Dana classification: 17.1.7.1
- Crystal system: Trigonal
- Crystal class: Hexagonal scalenohedral (3̅m); H-M symbol: (3̅ 2/m)
- Space group: R3̅m
- Unit cell: a = 9.172(2) Å, c = 33.51(1) Å, Z = 3

Identification
- Color: Colorless, white, pale yellow, pale yellow-green
- Cleavage: Good on {0001}, perhaps a parting
- Tenacity: Sectile, flexible
- Mohs scale hardness: 1–1.5
- Luster: Dull
- Streak: White
- Diaphaneity: Semitransparent
- Specific gravity: 1.43–1.53
- Optical properties: Uniaxial (+)
- Refractive index: n_{α} = 1.510, n_{β} = 1.510
- Birefringence: δ = 0.012

Motukoreaite is a mineral with formula Mg_{6}Al_{3}(OH)_{18}[Na(H_{2}O)_{6}](SO_{4})_{2}·6H_{2}O (possibly more than one species). The mineral is named for Motukorea, the island in New Zealand where it was discovered. Motukoreaite was first noted in 1941 and officially described in 1977.

== Description ==
Motukoreaite occurs as claylike cement or hexagonal tabular crystals up to 0.2 mm (0.0079 in) in size that form rosettes, boxworks, and subparallel aggregates. The crystals are semitransparent and are white, pale yellow, pale yellow-green, or colorless. The mineral readily dehydrates partially.

Motukoreaite has been found in association with apatite, barite, calcite, chabazite, calcic plagioclase, gismondine, gypsum, hisingerite, hydrotalcite, limonite, magnetite, montmorillonite, nordstrandite, olivine, phillipsite, pyroxene, quartz, and zeolites.

== Formation ==
Motukoreaite forms from the alteration of submarine basaltic glass at temperatures below 150 °C (302 °F). The alteration occurs in the sequence motukoreaite, phillipsite, calcite. A study in 1989 suggested that motukoreaite is a common, widely occurring mineral.

== History ==
Motukoreaite was first identified as "beach limestone" by J. A. Bartrum in 1941 at two locations along the shore of Motukorea where it occurs as a coating or alteration of basaltic sand and basaltic tuff related to a small Pleistocene volcanic cone. In 1977, the new mineral was officially described from the island and the name motukoreaite was approved by the Commission on New Minerals and Mineral Names in honor of the island. The mineral's small crystal size made determination of its optical properties difficult.

== Distribution ==
Motukoreaite is known from Motukorea, New Zealand, La Piatta quarry in Italy, Stradner Kogel in Austria, and the western Mediterranean Sea near Spain. It has been reported from the Surtsey Island and other locations on the mid-Atlantic Ridge. It also occurs along the axial rift of the Red Sea.

The type material is held at the University of Auckland in Auckland, New Zealand, the Natural History Museum, London, and the National Museum of Natural History in Washington, D.C.
