= Tame Te Rangi =

New Zealand civil servant

Tame Te Rangi is a New Zealand civil servant, administrator and sport commentator. Of Māori descent, he identifies with the Ngāti Whātua iwi. He has held roles relating to the New Zealand Qualifications Authority, Te Māngai Pāho, Ngati Whatua and Hato Petera College.

In the 1990s Te Rangi worked for the New Zealand Qualifications Authority, where he establish contacts which later got him a job at Te Māngai Pāho, working for chief executive Trevor Moeke. Conflicts of interest between his Te Māngai Pāho roles and later-developed sports commentating roles for Maori Sports Casting International (which received funding overseen by Te Rangi from Te Māngai Pāho) were revealed as part of a campaign against Te Māngai Pāho by politician Rodney Hide. The affair cost Te Rangi, Moeke and chairman Toby Curtis their jobs.

In 2015 Te Rangi chaired the selection panel for Auckland Council's Independent Maori Statutory Board, which was involved in a high-profile legal and political battle with Auckland Council and candidate Willie Jackson. Jackson and Te Rangi are both on the board of Hato Petera Trust.
