= Paora Tūhaere =

New Zealand Māori leader (c. 1825–1892)

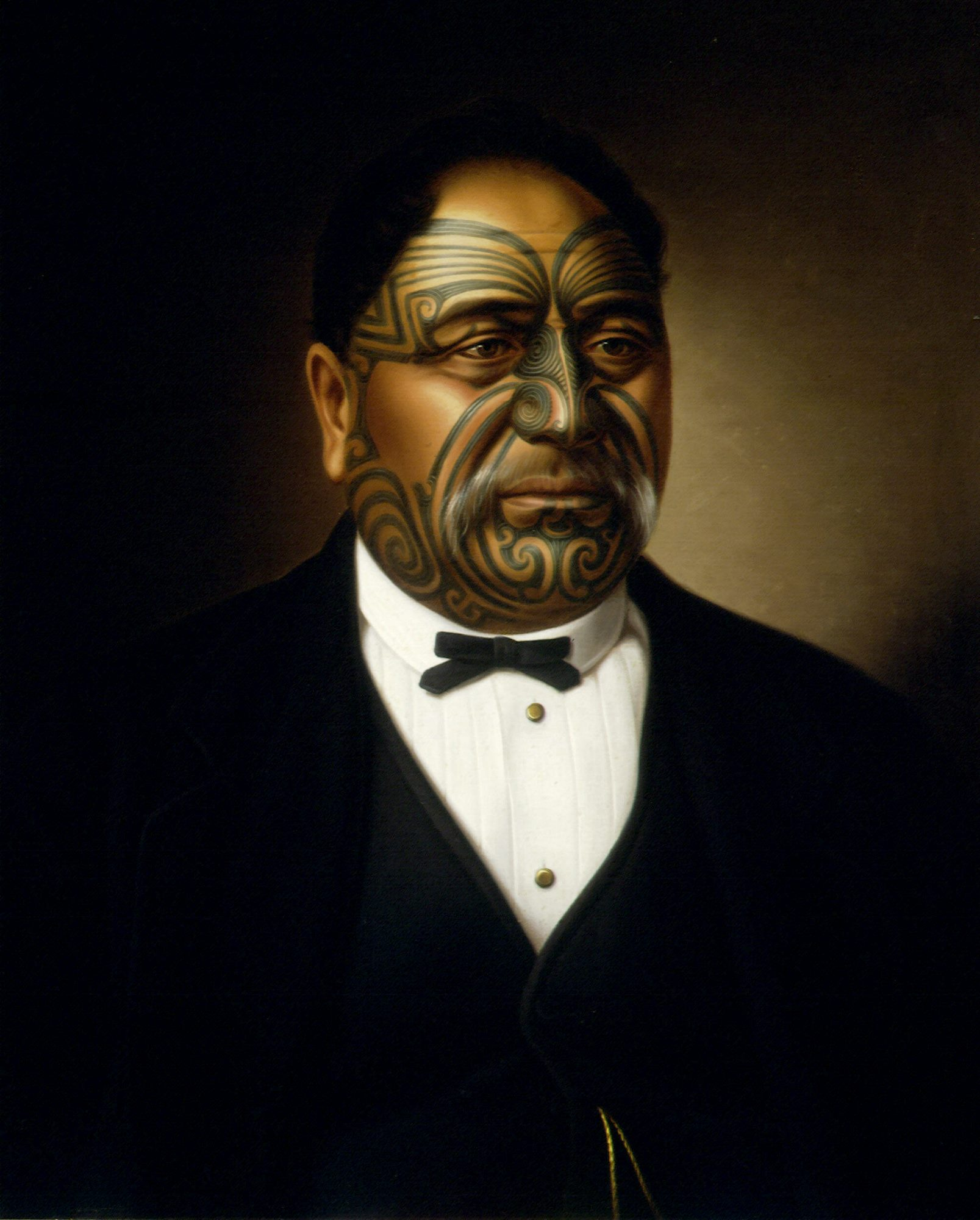
- Portrait of Paora Tūhaere by Gottfried Lindauer
- Born: ~1825
- Died: March 12, 1892 (aged 66–67)

Paora Tūhaere (c. 1825 – 12 March 1892) was a leader of the Ngāti Whātua Māori iwi (tribe) of Auckland, New Zealand, in the 19th century. His mother was Atareta Tuha, the sister of Ngāti Whātua leader Apihai Te Kawau, and his father was Whanararei, from Te Taoū hapū of Ngāti Whātua. He became the acknowledged leader of the iwi when Te Kawau died in 1869.

Tūhaere was born at Hikurangi near Piha on the west coast of the Waitākere Ranges, during the time of the Musket Wars, when Ngāti Whātua took refuge in the ranges and the Waikato Region.
