= Puhinui Reserve =

Protected working farm in Auckland

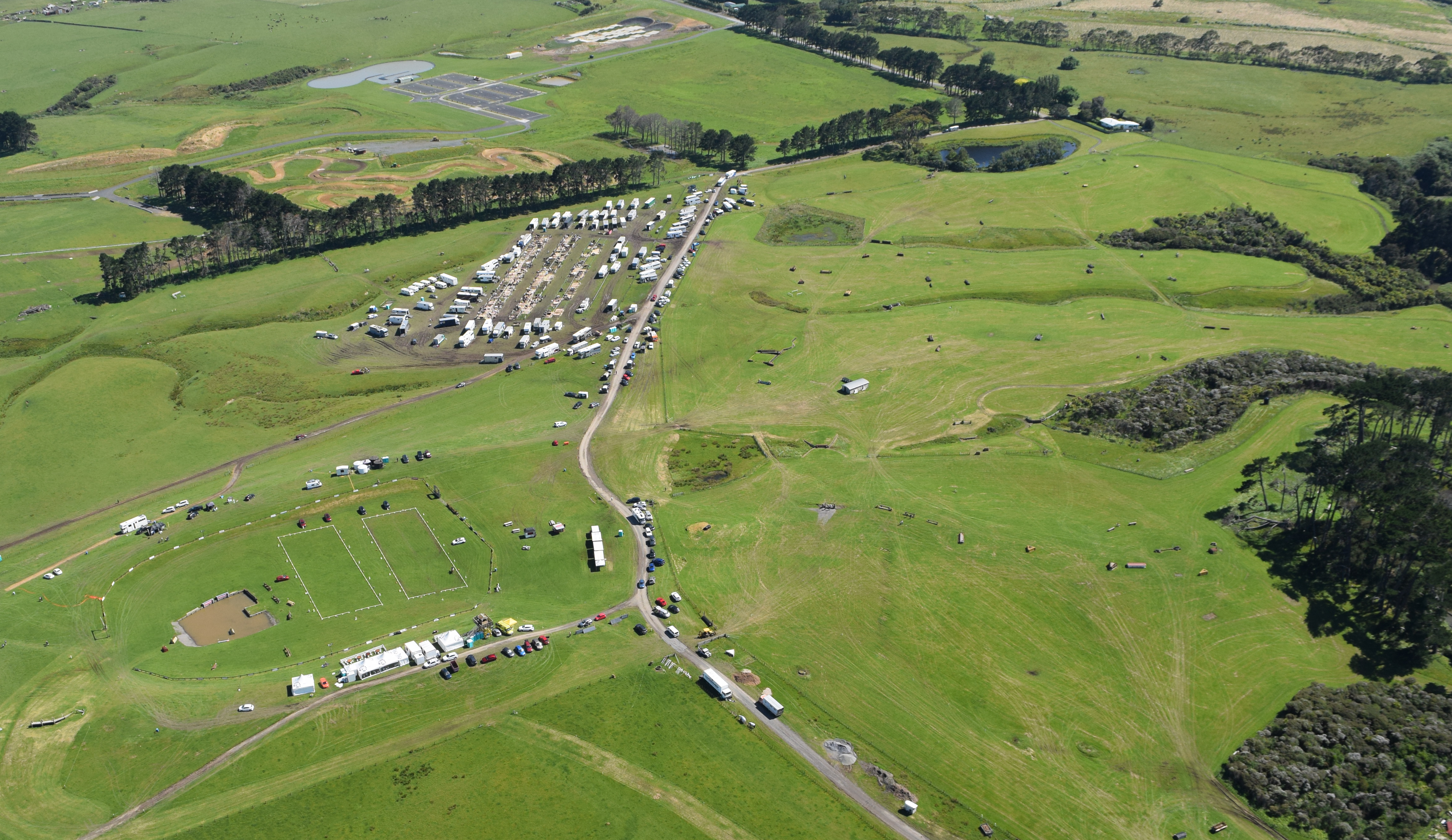
- Oblique aerial photo of the northern end of the reserve, showing the Puhinui Craters, 2018
- Interactive map of Puhinui Reserve
- Type: Public park
- Location: Wiri, Auckland, New Zealand
- Coordinates: 37.020°S 174.839°E
- Area: 199 ha (490 acres)
- Created: 1991
- Operator: Auckland Council
- Status: Open year round

The Puhinui Reserve is a protected working farm and wetland area in South Auckland, New Zealand, on the shores of the Manukau Harbour. It is the location of the Puhinui Craters, and is an area is of particular significance to Waiohua iwi, including Te Ākitai Waiohua and Ngāti Te Ata..

== Geology ==
The Puhinui Reserve is a peninsula between the Puhinui Creek and the Manukau Harbour. The soil is predominantly composed of ash, alluvium and peat.

=== Puhinui Craters ===
Part of the Auckland Volcanic Field, it includes the Puhinui Craters, a cluster of three small maar craters all of roughly 200 m (660 ft) diameter. They were first recognised as volcanic craters in 2011. Their ages are unknown but most likely all erupted at the same time.

Puhinui Pond Crater contains a farm pond and is located near the reserve entrance.

Puhinui Arena Crater is breached on both the west and east sides. Its drained and sediment-filled flat floor is 2–2.5 m (6.6–8.2 ft) below the rim of the surrounding tuff ring.

Puhinui Eroded Crater lies directly east of Arena Crater. Its eroded tuff ring is breached at both west and east ends and is partly eroded by the adjacent Puhinui Creek.

== Biodiversity ==
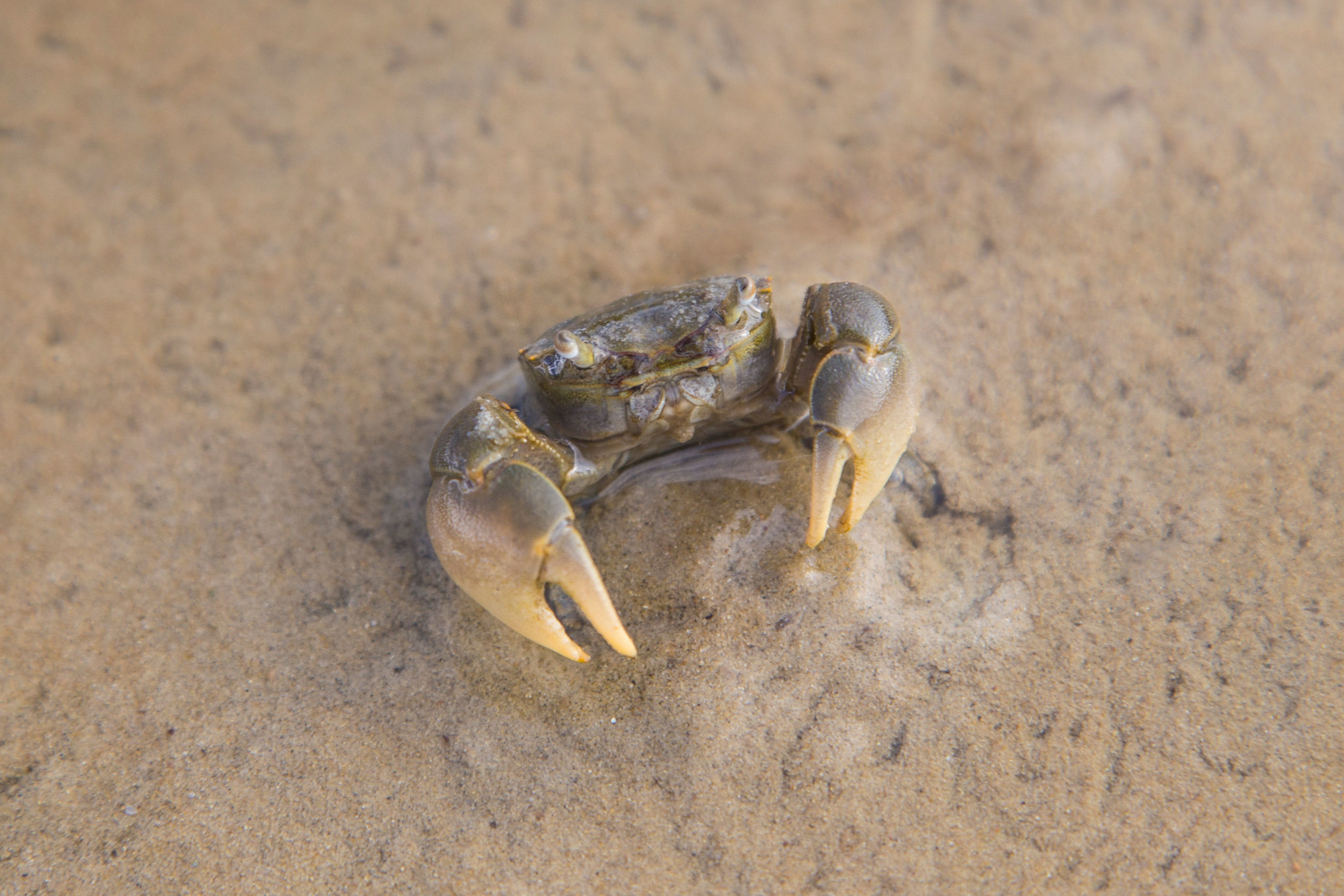
A tunnelling mud crab, endemic to New Zealand, observed in the Manukau Harbour close to the Puhinui Reserve

The reserve is the largest area of saltmarsh remaining on the Manukau Harbour, situated on the estuarine transitional zone between the freshwater Puhinui Creek and the saltwater Manukau Harbour. The sandflats, mangroves and shellbanks support populations of the buff-banded rail and the New Zealand fernbird.

== History ==
=== Māori Occupation ===
Similar to Ihumātao located closeby on the Manukau Harbour, the Puhinui Reserve area has been settled by Tāmaki Māori peoples for at least six hundred years, as a gardening and food gathering area. It is adjacent to the Waokauri / Pūkaki portage, one of the three major points where waka could be hauled between the Manukau Harbour and the east coast, and the Puhinui Creek, which provided access to much of inland the South Auckland area (and to the Manukau Harbour in turn). The area is of particular significance to Waiohua iwi, including Te Ākitai Waiohua and Ngāti Te Ata.

=== European occupation ===
Puhinui Reserve Granted to James Reddy Clendon Extent of the "Fairburn purchase"

In the 1830s William Fairburn, a missionary with the Church Missionary Society, claimed to have purchased most of South Auckland (83,000 acres, stretching from Papatoetoe to Papakura) from Māori. After the treaty signing in 1840, the purchase was examined by the newly formed Colony of New Zealand. Fairburn was allowed to keep a seventh of the land, with the Crown keeping the "surplus lands".

Puhinui Reserve was part of a 10,000 acre block granted by the Government to the trader James Reddy Clendon in 1840 — known as the Clendon Grant.

=== McLaughlin family ===
In the 1850s, the land became a part of the McLaughlin family's Puhi Nui estate.

=== Reserve ===
The reserve was purchased by the Manukau City Council in 1991. The reserve is managed as a working sheep and cattle farm, as well as a protected wetland.
