= Puhinui Creek =

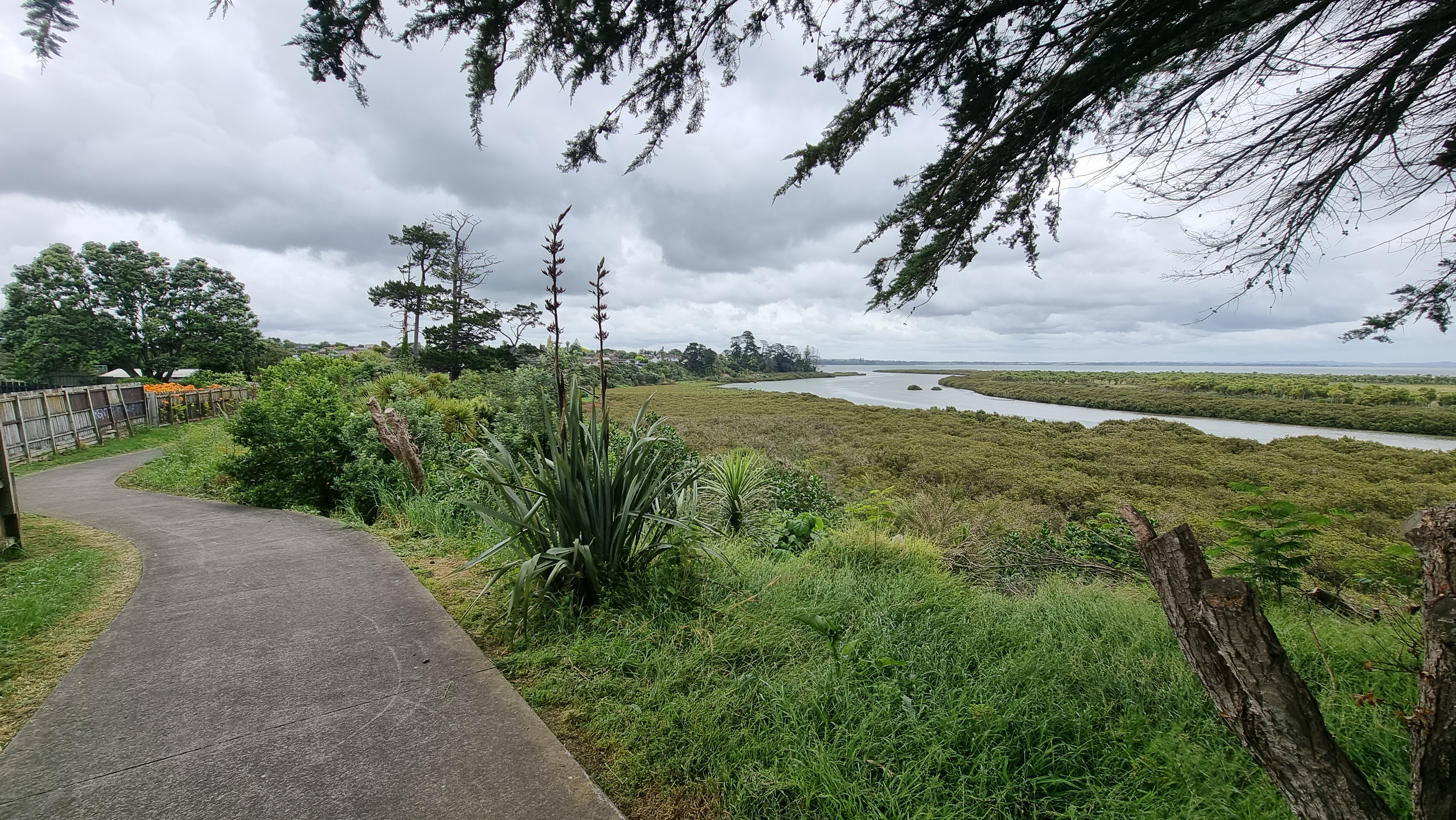
- Mouth of the Puhinui Creek at Clendon Park

- Mouth of the Puhinui Creek Puhinui Creek (New Zealand)
- Route of the Puhinui Creek
- Native name: Te Puhinui

Location
- Country: New Zealand
- Region: Auckland Region

Physical characteristics
- Source
  - location: Totara Park
  - coordinates: 36.99003°S 174.91568°E
- Mouth: Manukau Harbour
  - coordinates: 37.03047°S 174.8531°E
- Length: 12 km (7 mi)

Basin features
- Progression: Puhinui Creek → Manukau Harbour

The Puhinui Creek, also known as the Puhinui Stream or Te Puhinui, is a major stream in South Auckland, in the Auckland Region of New Zealand's North Island. It flows westwards from Totara Park through Manukau, then southwest at Wiri to the Manukau Harbour, Clendon Park.

== Description ==
The stream begins in Totara Park, a nature reserve in South Auckland east of Manukau. The stream flows south towards the Auckland Botanic Gardens, then changes course, flowing west and north-west through Manurewa, Wiri and Manukau. At Wiri, the stream changes course again, flowing south-south west to the Puhinui Reserve and out into the Manukau Harbour, and Clendon Park. The stream is approximately 12 kilometres long, and the catchment covers approximately 2,964 hectares.

== History ==
The stream is in the traditional rohe of Waiohua, including Ngāti Te Ata Waiohua and Te Ākitai Waiohua, and was traditionally used to collect flax and eels. The name Puhinui (large war canoe plume) is a reference to a conflict between the Waiohua and Marutūāhu tribes of the Hauraki Gulf, and was the name of a Marutūāhu waka taua that hid in ambush in the stream. The mouth of the stream has been settled by Tāmaki Māori peoples for at least six hundred years, The volcanoes adjacent to the creek, Matukutūreia and Matukutūruru were home to two hilltop pā, collectively known as Matukurua. The names of the mountains commemorate a story of two chiefs. The chief of Matukutūruru ("the bittern standing at ease") was captured while eel fishing. The chief of Matukutūreia ("the vigilant bittern") saved the pā and the people of Matukutūruru. Over 8,000 hectares of stonefield gardens were tended by Tāmaki Māori peoples on the lower slopes of the volcanoes, where crops such as kūmara and bracken fern root were grown. The upper stream catchment was a hinterland, primarily used for resource collecting.

In January 1836 missionary William Thomas Fairburn brokered a land sale between Tāmaki Māori chiefs, including the Puhinui Creek catchment. It is unclear what the chiefs understood or consented to, as Māori continued to live in South Auckland, unchanged by this sale. In the 1850s, the land around the lower Puhinui Creek became a part of the McLaughlin family's Puhi Nui estate. The Invasion of the Waikato in 1863 led to the confiscation of lands around the creek.

In the 20th century, much of the catchment of the Puhinui Creek was farmland. During World War II, American military camps were established at Totara Park, along the banks of the upper Puhinui Creek. The stream was heavily modified in the 20th century, especially with the construction of the Southern and Southwestern Motorways, which bisect the creek. In 1982, the Auckland Botanic Gardens was opened along the upper creek.

By the early 2000s, the stream had become one of the more polluted waterways in the Auckland Region. Intensive regeneration work took place beginning in the early 2000s, leading the Puhinui Creek to be named the most improved stream at the 2016 NZ River Awards. In 2022, the Auckland Council partnered with Te Ākitai Waiohua, Ngāti Tamaoho and Ngāti Te Ata Waiohua to create Te Whakaoranga o te Puhinui, a generational plan to restore the creek. By July 2023, over 14,000 native trees has been planted along the banks of the stream.

== Amenities ==
- Auckland Botanic Gardens, a large garden in the upper catchment of the creek
- The Tōtara Puhinui Creek Path is a public walkway in Totara Park, along the banks of the stream's upper catchment.
- The Puhinui Stream Forest Trail is a walking track linking Totara Park with the Auckland Botanic Gardens.
- The Puhinui Reserve is a reserve at the mouth of the creek, an important estuarine nature reserve habitat.

== See also ==
- List of rivers of New Zealand
