= 1993 Auckland mid-air collision =

Aviation incident in New Zealand

- Fire crews attending the Piper Archer wreckage

Accident
- Date: 26 November 1993
- Summary: Mid-air collision
- Site: Auckland, New Zealand; 36.8583°S 174.7583°E
- Total fatalities: 4 (all)
- Total injuries: 1 on ground
- Total survivors: 0 (none)

First aircraft
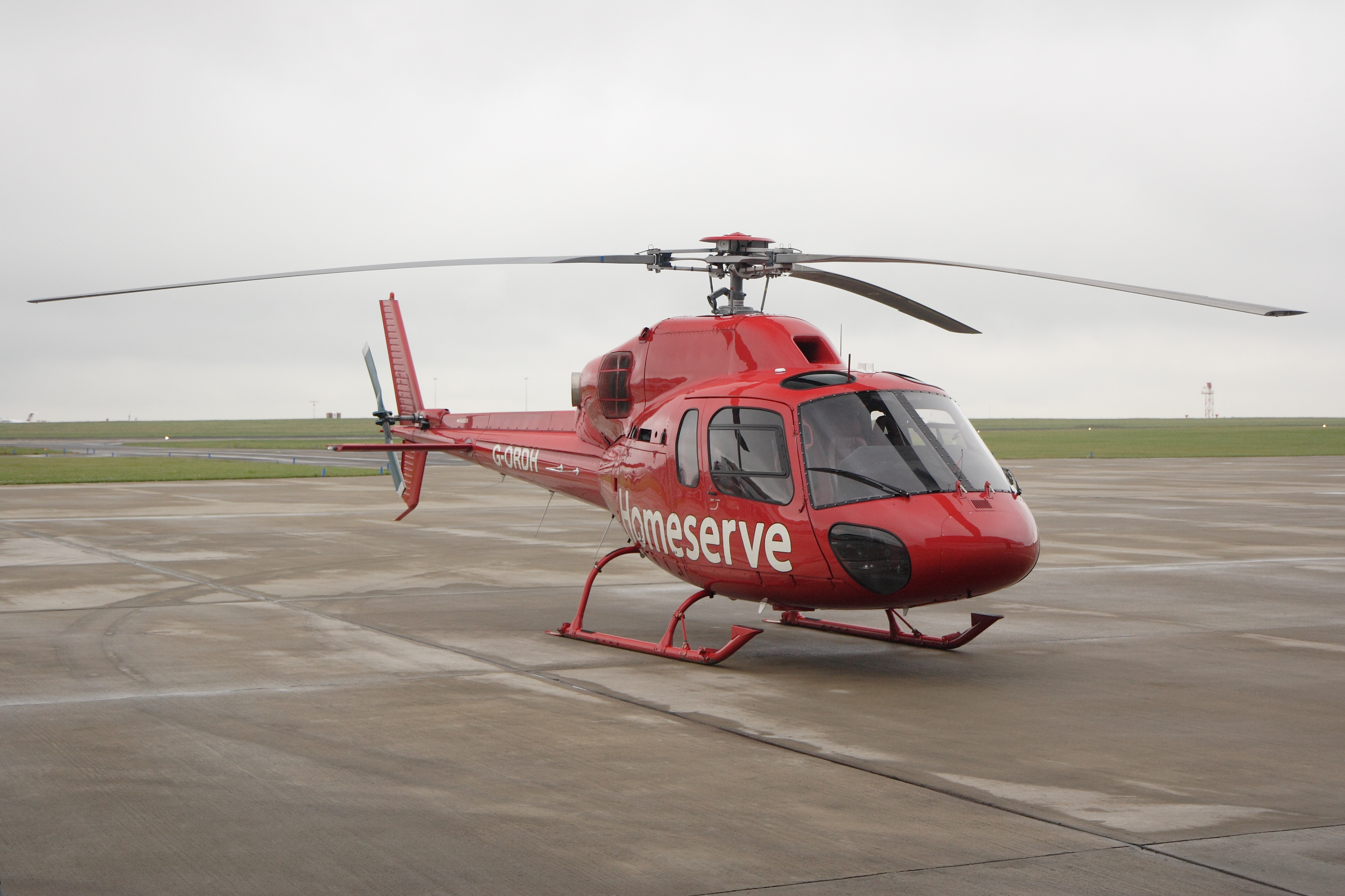
- An Aérospatiale TwinStar, similar to the crash helicopter
- Type: Aérospatiale AS 355 F1
- Name: Police Eagle
- Operator: Airwork (NZ), contracted to the New Zealand Police
- Registration: ZK-HIT
- Flight origin: Mechanics Bay Heliport
- Crew: 3
- Fatalities: 3 (all)

Second aircraft
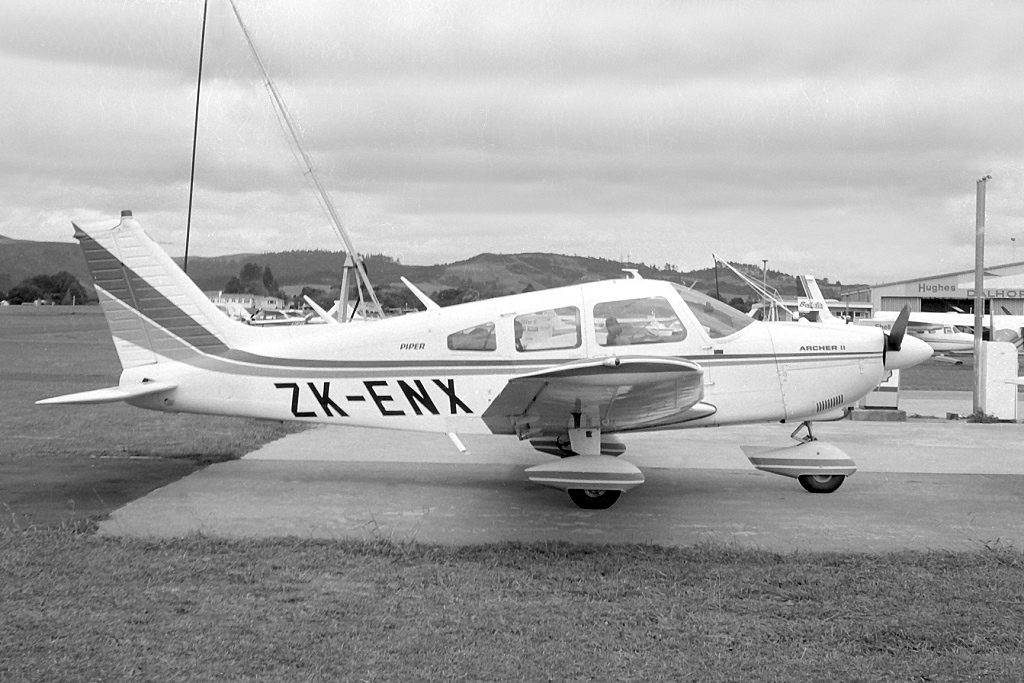
- ZK-ENX, the Piper Archer involved the collision
- Type: Piper PA 28-181
- Operator: Airwork (NZ), contracted to the New Zealand Police
- Registration: ZK-ENX
- Flight origin: Ardmore Aerodrome
- Crew: 1
- Fatalities: 1 (all)

The 1993 Auckland mid-air collision was an aircraft accident in New Zealand. It occurred on 26 November 1993, when two aircraft operated by Airwork, under contract to the New Zealand Police, collided and crashed in central Auckland. The mid-air collision of the Aérospatiale TwinStar helicopter and Piper Archer aeroplane resulted in the deaths of all four occupants – a civilian Airwork pilot on each aircraft and two New Zealand Police officers on the helicopter. The accident occurred in daylight with excellent visibility, in uncontrolled airspace (class G), with both aircraft flying under visual flight rules. Both the helicopter and aeroplane were operated by Airwork (NZ), and working under contract to the New Zealand Police at the time of the accident.

The Transport Accident Investigation Commission investigation found the accident occurred because neither pilot saw the other aircraft.

== Aérospatiale aircraft ==
The Aérospatiale TwinStar AS 355 F1, registration ZK-HIT, was using call signs "Police One" with air traffic control and "Eagle" with police control. It was operating out of Mechanics Bay Heliport, the base of the police Air Support Unit, 1 NM east of the central city. The helicopter performed ad hoc missions around the city, usually at 1,000 feet AMSL, and on 26 November was being piloted by Ross Jeffree Harvey (aged 41), with Police Air Support Unit officers Sergeant Lindsay Eion "Lou" Grant (39) and Constable Alastair Alan Sampson (27). At 4:22 pm it returned to the heliport after a routine mission for a break of about an hour, and was logged taking off again at 5:33 pm. It departed to the north over Waitematā Harbour and shortly afterwards made a turn to the left to a southwest heading. It flew this course, climbing, for about 1 minute before making a 30° turn to the left, continuing climbing through 1,200 feet until the accident 18 seconds later.

== Piper aircraft ==
The Piper Archer 28-181, registration ZK-ENX, call sign "Pact 1" (Police Airborne Control of Traffic) was flying a regular weekday traffic patrol, piloted by Allan Anthony Connors (aged 27). The patrols were normally conducted at 1,500 feet. It left Ardmore Aerodrome at 3:59 pm, and reported on several traffic incidents. Shortly after 5:32 pm, the aircraft flew south from the North Shore to a road accident on the Auckland Southern Motorway near the Symonds Street on-ramp. It flew southeast past the road accident, and began a turn to the left around the accident site. The aircraft turned through about 270° and was turning through a southwest heading when the collision occurred. The accident interrupted a report the pilot was making to Police Control over the radio.

== Collision ==
Map of the flight paths over central Auckland, red is the Aérospatiale TwinStar helicopter, blue the Piper Archer

The collision occurred at 5:34:48 pm, near the intersection of Queen Street and Karangahape Road, at an altitude of about 1,400 feet. The left wing of the Archer separated, and the aircraft rolled, dived steeply, and crashed into the elevated carriageway on the Central Motorway Junction between the Northern and Southern Motorways. The wing landed on a church roof. The TwinStar lost the main rotor and transmission, and rear tail boom, vertical stabiliser, and rear rotor. It fell onto the Grafton Road on-ramp to the Northwestern Motorway, under Symonds Street Bridge, and a severe fire broke out, fuelled by 700 litres of kerosene. The main rotor and tail section fell into a cemetery by Karangahape Road.

Helicopter debris caused moderate facial burns to the driver of a car, who was taken to Auckland City Hospital. The accident created substantial traffic congestion, which hampered emergency services responding to the scene. A witness at Mount Eden, 1.3 NM south of the site, caught the accident on video (after the collision).

== Investigation ==
Wreckage of the Aérospatiale TwinStar on the Northwestern Motorway link

The Transport Accident Investigation Commission was notified of the accident at 6:20 pm, and appointed J J Goddard Investigator in Charge. He began a field investigation later that evening. The wreckage was moved to a storage site prior to inspection, as it was causing a serious obstruction to major public highways. The wreckage inspection found the outboard 50 cm (20 in) of the left wing had been cut off the Archer, and found matching damage on one rotor blade of the helicopter, including paint similar to the airplane primer.

The U.S. Federal Aviation Administration conducted a cockpit field of view survey for the Commission. The relative angular position was plotted on the diagram from each aircraft, for 28 seconds prior to the collision. It showed the helicopter would have been visible to the Archer pilot, appearing for about ten seconds in the lower centre windscreen, before being obscured by the engine nose around 18 seconds before the accident. The diagram also showed the low position of the sun may have affected the pilot's ability to see the helicopter. For the TwinStar pilot, the aeroplane would have been visible only for a few seconds in the top left corner of the windscreen. The two observers in the helicopter, sitting in the left front and rear, had no obstruction preventing them seeing the approaching Archer.

The Commission found the Airwork (NZ) Operations Manual specifically addressed collision avoidance between these two aircraft:

5 Police Traffic Patrol

4. Heights at which the patrol is to be carried out at.

4.1. 1500' or lower depending on
—weather conditions
—required by ATC
—or in accordance with Reg 38 of the Civil Aviation Regulations
4.2. NB The Police Eagle Helicopter also operates in the same areas, and the pilots have agreed to carry out their operations at 1000' where possible

12. Miscellaneous

12.4 Under no circumstances is the Traffic Patrol aircraft to operate in close proximity to the Eagle Helicopter while the Helicopter is engaged on an incident. A good lookout is imperative and shall be maintained at all times.

Discussions with other pilots of the aircraft and police crew found they were familiar with the normal operating altitudes of 1,500 feet for the Police Traffic Patrol and 1,000 feet for the Police Eagle.

The Commission found the accident occurred because neither pilot saw the other aircraft. Contributing factors were the helicopter not levelling at the agreed altitude, the helicopter did not establish mutual position by radio, and the helicopter crew did not see the traffic in time. It also cited the inherent limitations with the "see and avoid" method as a causal factor. The Commission recommended the Director of Civil Aviation promulgate a single advisory radio frequency for aircraft in the uncontrolled airspace between Auckland and Whenuapai Control Zones, which he did.

== Aftermath ==
Helicopter owner Vertical Flight successfully sued Airwork for damages of $1.5 million due to the loss of the helicopter, with the decision being upheld on appeal.

== Sources ==
- "Investigation 93-020". Transport Accident Investigation Commission. Archived from the original on 2011-10-03.
