= Ngāti Whātua =

Māori iwi (tribe) in New Zealand

- Iwi (tribe) in Māoridom
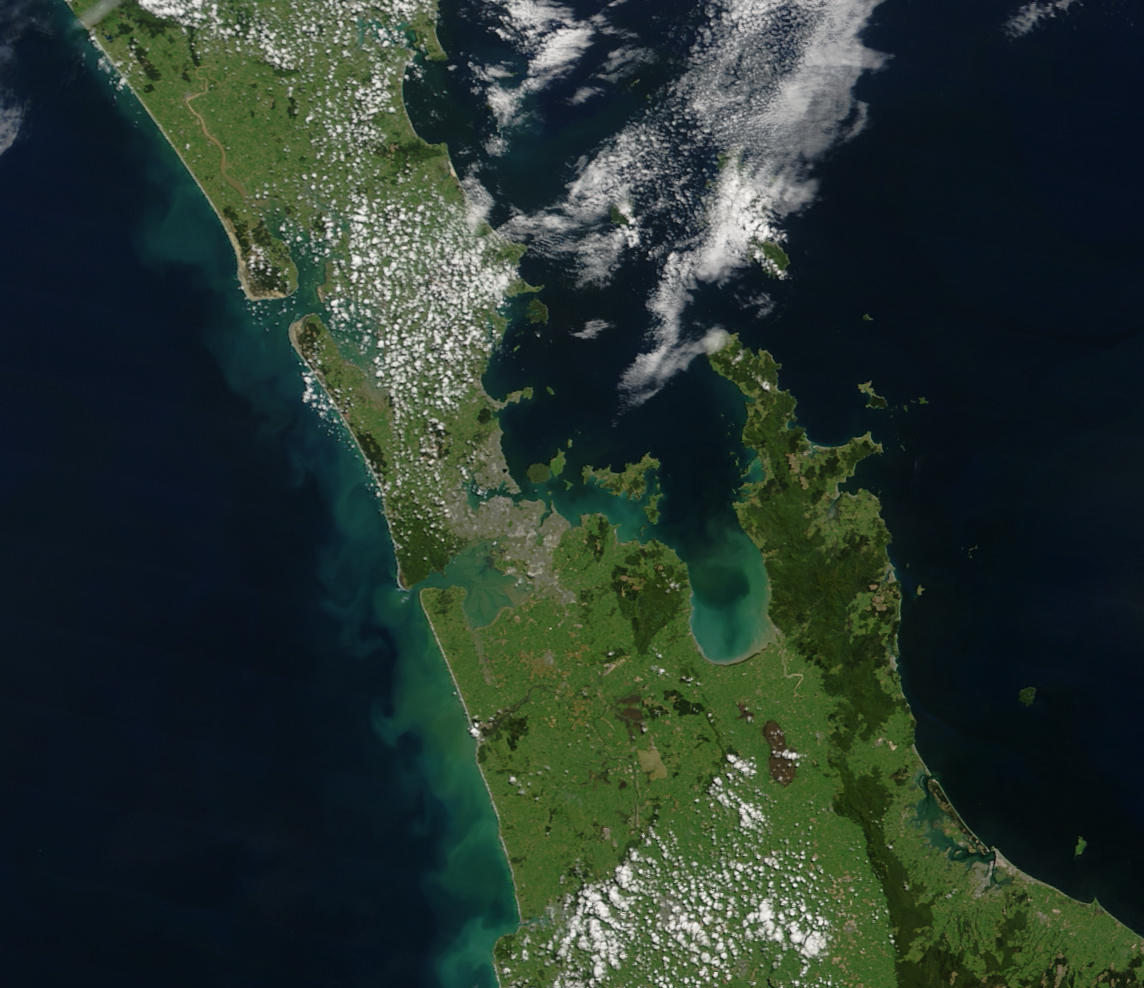
- Lower Northland Peninsula

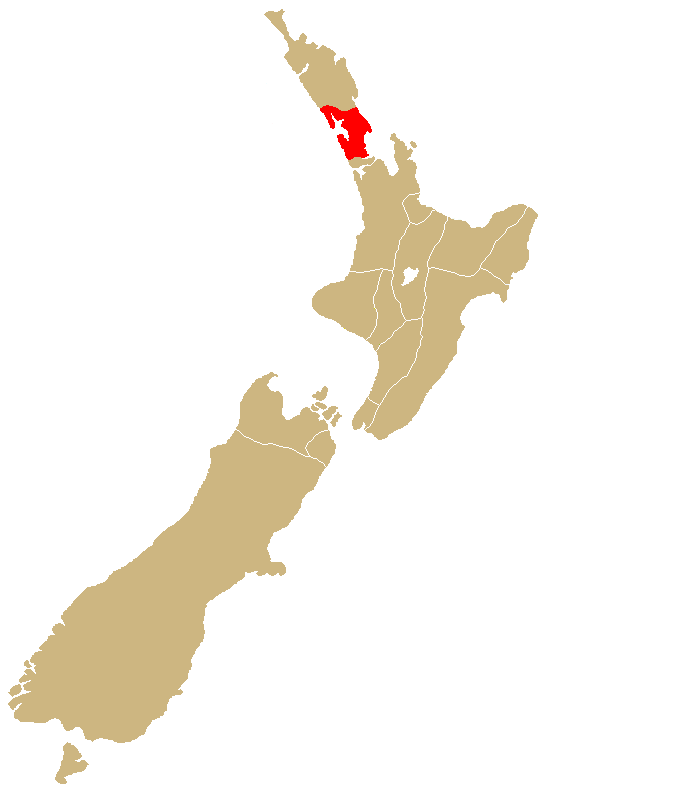
- Rohe (region): Northland and Auckland
- Waka (canoe): Māhuhu-ki-te-rangi
- Website: www.ngatiwhatua.iwi.nz

Ngāti Whātua is a Māori iwi (tribe) of the lower Northland Peninsula of New Zealand's North Island. It comprises a confederation of five hapū (subtribes) interconnected both by ancestry and by association over time: Te Uri-o-Hau, Te Roroa, Te Taoū, Ngāti Whātua o Kaipara and Ngāti Whātua-o-Ōrākei. The five hapū can act together or separately as independent tribes.

Ngāti Whātua's territory or rohe is traditionally expressed as, "Tāmaki ki Maunganui i te Tai Hauauru" and "Tāmaki ki Manaia i te Rawhiti". The northern boundary is expressed as, "Manaia titiro ki Whatitiri, Whatitiri titiro ki Tutamoe, Tutamoe titiro ki Maunganui". The southern boundary is expressed as, "Te awa o Tāmaki". The area runs from Tāmaki River in the south to Maunganui Bluff (at the northern end of Aranga Beach on the west coast) in the north, and to Whangārei Harbour on the east coast. By the time of European settlement in New Zealand, Ngāti Whātua's territory was around the Kaipara Harbour and stretching south to Tāmaki Makaurau, the site of present-day Auckland.

== History ==
Ngāti Whātua descends from the ancestor Tuputupuwhenua (also known as Tumutumuwhenua). The iwi traces its arrival in New Zealand to the Māhuhu-ki-te-rangi canoe, which landed north of the Kaipara Harbour. They also descend from ancestors who migrated from Muriwhenua in the Far North and intermarried with the tribes in Ngāti Whātua's territory. By the 16th and 17th century, Ngāti Whātua had become established around the Kaipara Harbour.

Rivalry with Ngāpuhi escalated in the early 19th century when Ngāpuhi acquired muskets. Ngāpuhi attacked Ngāti Whātua in 1807 or 1808 in the battle of Moremonui north of Dargaville – probably the occasion of the first use of firearms in Māori warfare. Ngāti Whātua overcame the Ngāpuhi warriors with hand weapons while Ngāpuhi were reloading their muskets, winning a decisive victory over the attackers. Ngāpuhi, led by Hongi Hika, exacted revenge in 1825 when they defeated Ngāti Whātua in the battle of Te Ika a Ranganui near Kaiwaka.

On 20 March 1840 in the Manukau Harbour area where Ngāti Whātua farmed, paramount chief Apihai Te Kawau signed the Māori translation of the Treaty of Waitangi, te tiriti o waitangi. Ngāti Whātua sought British protection from Ngāpuhi as well as a reciprocal relationship with the Crown and the Church. Soon after signing the Treaty, Te Kawau offered land on the Waitematā Harbour to William Hobson, the new Governor of New Zealand, for his new capital. Hobson took up the offer and moved the capital of New Zealand to Tāmaki Makaurau, naming the settlement Auckland.

Ngāti Whātua came to national prominence in the 1970s in a dispute over vacant land at Bastion Point, a little way east of the Auckland city centre, adjoining the suburb of Ōrākei. The land, which the New Zealand government had acquired cheaply for public works many decades before, largely reverted to the tribe after a long occupation and passive resistance.

== Governance ==
Te Rūnanga o Ngāti Whātua has a mandate, recognised by the New Zealand Government, to negotiate Treaty of Waitangi settlements for Ngāti Whātua. It is also a mandated iwi organisation under the Māori Fisheries Act, and an Iwi Aquaculture Organisation in the Māori Commercial Aquaculture Claims Settlement Act. It represents Ngāti Whātua as an iwi authority under the Resource Management Act and is a Tūhono organisation.

The Rūnanga is a Māori Trust Board governed by 11 trustees from 5 takiwā or districts: 1 trustee from Ōrākei, 2 from South Kaipara, 3 from Ōtamatea, 1 from Whangārei and 4 from Northern Wairoa. As of 2026, the chair of the trust is Tyrone Raumati, the deputy chair is Margie Tukerangi, the Manahautū is Alan Riwaka, and the trust is based in Whangarei.

The iwi has interest in the territory of Northland Regional Council, Auckland Council, Kaipara District Council and Whangarei District Council.

== Hapū and marae ==
=== Northern Wairoa ===
- Ngāti Hinga hapū, based at Ahikiwi marae (Te Aranga Mai o te Whakapono wharenui), Kaihū
- Ngāti Torehina, based at Taita marae (Kia Mahara Koutou wharenui), Māmaranui
- Unidentified hapū, based at Kāpehu marae (Tāringaroa wharenui), Mititai, and Tama te Uaua marae (Tama te Uaua wharenui), Kaihū
- Te Popoto, based at Ōtūrei marae (Rangimārie Te Aroha wharenui), Aratapu
- Te Roroa, based at Pananawe marae (Te Taumata o Tiopira Kinaki wharenui), Waipoua; Te Houhanga marae (Rāhiri wharenui), Dargaville; Waikarā marae (Te Uaua wharenui), Aranga;
- Te Uri o Hau, based at: Otamatea Marae, Kaipara, Maungataroto. Naumai marae (Ngā Uri o te Kotahitanga wharenui), Ruawai; Ōtūrei marae (Rangimārie Te Aroha wharenui), Aratapu; Rīpia marae (No wharenui), Rīpia, and Pouto; Waikaretu marae, Matakohe; Parirau Marae-Wharemarama (Te Uri-o-Hau).

=== Whangarei ===
The Whangarei district has four hapū (sub-tribes):

- Patuharakeke hapū, based at Takahiwai marae (Rangiora wharenui), Takahiwai
- Te Kuihi hapū, based at Tangiterōria marae (Tirarau wharenui), Tangiterōria
- Te Parawhau hapū, based at Korokota marae (Tikitiki o Rangi wharenui), Tītoki and Tangiterōria marae (Tirarau wharenui), Tangiterōria
- Te Uriroroi hapū, based at Toetoe marae (Toetoe wharenui), Ōtaika

=== Ōrākei ===
- Ngā Oho, based at Ōrākei marae (with Tumutumuwhenua wharenui), Ōrākei
- Te Taoū, based at Ōrākei marae (with Tumutumuwhenua wharenui), Ōrākei
- Te Uri Ngutu, based at Ōrākei marae (with Tumutumuwhenua wharenui), Ōrākei

== Radio station ==
Ake 1179 is the official radio station of Ngāti Whātua, but is not officially part of the iwi radio network. It broadcasts on 1179 AM in Auckland, and features a combination of urban contemporary music and traditional storytelling.

== Notable people ==
- Dame Naida Glavish, politician and community leader
- Joe Hawke, politician and businessman
- Josh Hohneck, rugby union player
- Erana James, actress
- Hugh Kāwharu, chief and academic
- Merata Kawharu, writer and academic
- Graham Latimer, former Māori Council president
- Manos Nathan, ceramicist
- Paraire Karaka Paikea, politician and church minister
- Ōtene Pāora, Māori leader and land negotiator
- Tame Te Rangi, civil servant and sports commentator
- Ngapipi Reweti, land negotiator
- Āpihai Te Kawau, tribal leader
- Pāora Tūhaere, tribal leader
- Diane Prince, artist, weaver and set designer
- Sir William Richard Wright, treaty negotiator and member of the New Zealand Order of Merit
