= Apihai Te Kawau =

New Zealand Māori paramount chief (died 1869)

Lithograph portrait of Apihai Te Kawau by Joseph Jenner Merrett, 1842

Hand-tinted lithograph of Apihai Te Kawau (seated) and his nephew Rēweti Tamahiki at Ōrākei, by George French Angas, 1847

Apihai Te Kawau (died November 1869) was a paramount chief of the Ngāti Whātua Māori iwi (tribe) of Auckland (Tāmaki Makaurau), New Zealand in the 19th century.

Te Kawau's father was Tarahawaiki and his grandfather was Tūperiri, the principal leader of Te Taoū hapū (sub-tribe) of Ngāti Whātua who overran the Tāmaki isthmus in the 1740s, defeating the Wai-o-Hua. Te Kawau's mother was Mokorua, who was descended from the Wai-o-Hua. Te Kawau was born at Ihumātao, near the Manukau Harbour.

Te Kawau is thought to have fought against the Ngāpuhi iwi in the Ngāti Whātua victory of Battle of Moremonui in 1807 or 1808. He then helped lead the 1,000 mile long Ngāti Whātua and Ngāti Maniapoto cannibalistic war expedition known as Te Āmiowhenua (encircling the land) from 1821 to 1822. After a major defeat to Ngāpuhi at Te Ika-a-ranga-nui in 1825, Te Kawau and his people left the Tāmaki isthmus (the future site of Auckland) for several years.

On 20 March 1840 in the Manukau Harbour area where Ngāti Whātua farmed, Te Kawau signed Te Tiriti o Waitangi (the te reo Māori translation of the Treaty of Waitangi). Ngāti Whātua sought British protection from Ngāpuhi as well as a reciprocal relationship with the Crown and the Church. Soon after signing the Treaty, Te Kawau made a tuku (strategic gift) of 3,500 acres (1,400 hectares) of land on the Waitematā Harbour for the new capital of Auckland.

Te Kawau was associated with the Church Mission Society (CMS) since meeting Samuel Marsden in 1820, and the two men become friends. During the 1840s, some time after becoming a Christian, he was baptised by Bishop George Selwyn at the chapel near Ōrākei Pā and was given the baptismal name of Āpihai, Māori for the biblical warrior Abishai.

In the 1850s Te Kawau was an assessor involved with settling disputes between Māori in Auckland. Known then as a peaceful man, he spoke publicly against land sales, but was unable to stop Governor George Grey's evictions and confiscations. In 1868 he secured the title to the last 700 acres of Ngāti Whātua land in Ōrākei for his iwi.

Te Kawau was the uncle of Paora Tūhaere, who succeeded him as a leader of Ngāti Whātua.

In 2018 Ngāti Whātua Ōrākei and the Ports of Auckland created a memorial to Te Kawau for his gifting of land to Governor Hobson and commemorating his contributions to Auckland, while marking the place where the city was founded on 18 September 1840.
