= Sesqui =

Sesqui, Latin for one-and-one-half times, may refer to:

- Sodium sesquicarbonate, a double salt of sodium bicarbonate and sodium carbonate
- Sesqui 1990, a 1990 festival in Wellington, New Zealand
- Sesquialtera (disambiguation), several meanings
- Sesquicentennial Exposition, a 1926 world's fair in Philadelphia, Pennsylvania, U.S.
- Sesquilinear, a property of the dot product in complex, multi-dimensional spaces
- Sesquiplane, a type of biplane where one wing is significantly smaller than the other

== See also ==
- Number prefix
