= Papakura Museum =

Museum in Papakura, New Zealand

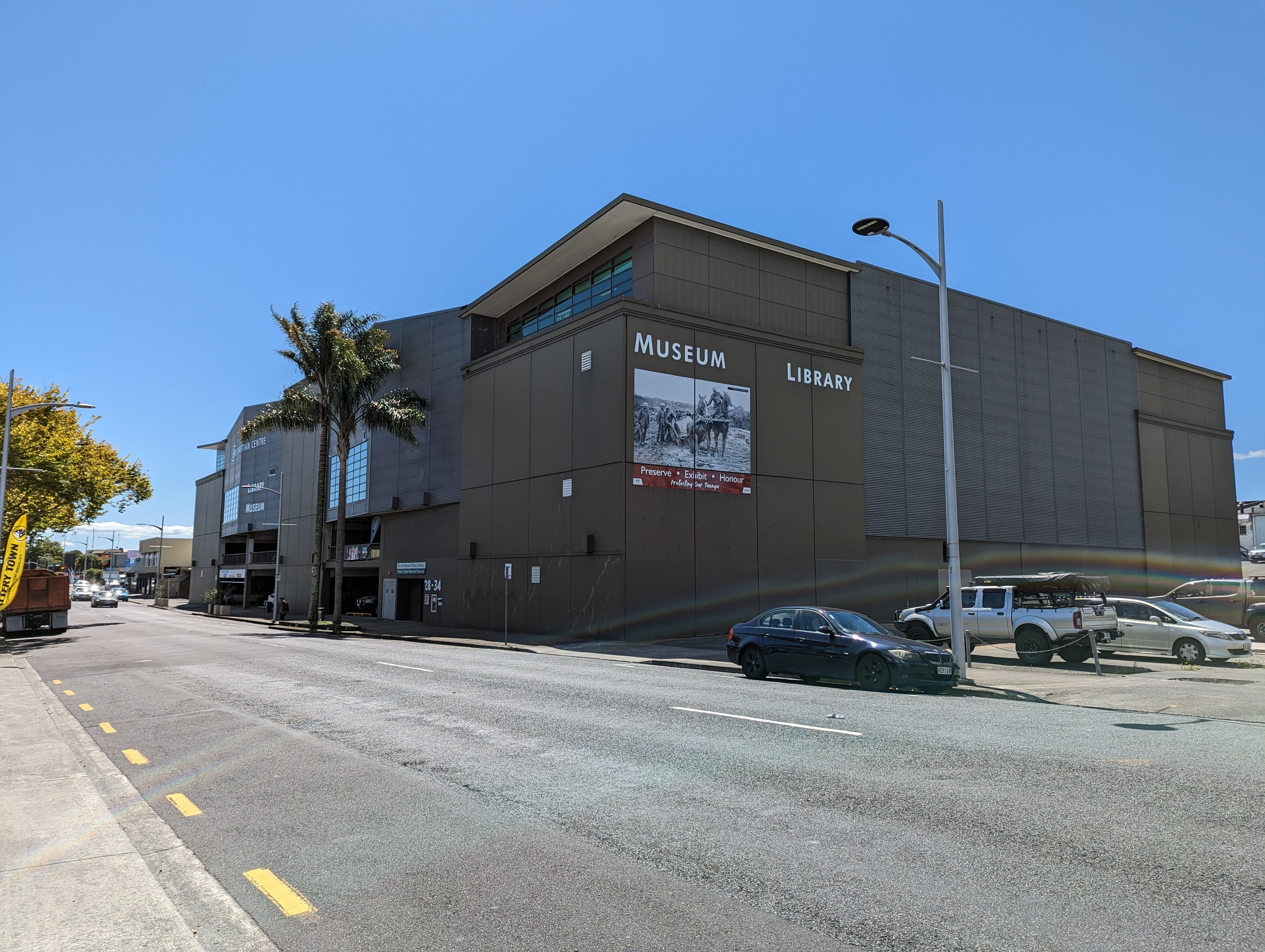
- Accent Point Building carpark entrance from East Street
- Established: 1972
- Location: Papakura, Auckland, New Zealand
- Coordinates: 37.0641°S 174.9422°E
- President: Aida Crombach
- Curator: Alan Knowles
- Public transit access: Papakura railway station
- Website: papakuramuseum.org.nz

The Papakura Museum is a local museum created to recognise and honour the history of Papakura, Drury, and surrounding districts, in New Zealand. This has historically included Franklin, Manurewa, Clevedon, and Kawakawa Bay, as well as other neighbourhoods and districts nearby. The Papakura Museum is a community based museum founded by the members of the Papakura & Districts Historical Society (PDHS). The Museum's permanent exhibition focuses on local history through text, image and artefact displays. The Military Gallery focuses on local military history. Each year the Museum curates four temporary feature exhibitions that run from 2–4 months and include a variety of topics and themes.

== History ==
In 1961, the Hunua branch of the Federated Farmers proposed the formation of a historical society to the Papakura Borough Council. Councillors Ernie Clarke and Deryck Milne were selected to begin work on the proposal and on December 6, 1961, an initial planning meeting was attended by twenty-nine members of the community. The first official meeting of the historical society then took place on March 20, 1962.

The late Ernest "Ernie" Clarke became the first president of the historical society (1962–1966), was heavily involved in the process of establishing the Museum, wrote and edited many of the Museum and historical society's publications, and originally the museum was named and dedicated to his memory.

In February 1972, the Papakura Council granted the PDHS two rooms in a house at 33 Coles Crescent to house artefacts that had been collected by the society. Artefacts had previously been housed in society members' private homes. In September 1972, the first exhibition of the society's collection was held at this location in collaboration with the Papakura Potters Society. In 1973, the museum opened to the public on Wednesday afternoons. In 1977, the public hours were extended to include Sunday afternoons as well.

In November 1982, after the fire brigade moved to new premises, the museum moved into the vacated fire station on Averill Street. Three years later in November 1985, the museum opened a research and archive room to researchers and anyone else interested in using this resource.

After several months of delays, the museum moved again and officially opened on August 31, 1999. The Papakura District Council built a community education complex called 'Accent Point House' at 209 Great South Road. This building was created to house the Sir Edmund Hillary Library, a schools resource centre, and the Papakura Museum. Originally located on the 4th floor of this complex the museum would eventually move downstairs to the 3rd floor in October 2010.

In 2017, the museum opened a dedicated Military Gallery space. This gallery is used to display information and artifacts about the wars and conflicts that have involved New Zealand. These range from the New Zealand Wars to present day peace-keeping operations. This gallery also houses the museum's permanent display of the Costar brothers' WWI artifact collection. This exhibit includes a touch-screen interactive display about the brothers' correspondence during their deployment.

== Exhibitions ==
Year	Dates	Exhibit title	Exhibit content	Guest exhibit	Location
1963	September 24–28		Historical exhibition for Waikato War centenary commemoration		
1964	November 9		Display stall of photographs at the Clevedon A&P Show for jubilee celebration		Clevedon A&P Show
1964	September 18		Display of artefacts at the Methodist Flower Show		Methodist Flower Show
1965	April 2–4	Viola Celebrations	Display of photographs in Clevedon and Papakura		Clevendon
1967	September		Display in Woolworth's window for Town and Country Day		90 Great South Road
1972	September 14–24	[First Official Museum Exhibition]	Exhibition in conjunction with the Papakura Potters Group		33 Coles Crescent
1976	February 23–28	Early Settler's Sunday	Exhibition to raise funds for the restoration of the Selwyn Chapel		Selwyn Chapel
1977	November	Regional Variations in Maori Carving	Special display		33 Coles Crescent
1983	May	Pioneer Medicine	Special display		33 Coles Crescent
1983		Handwriting	Special display		33 Coles Crescent
1983	November		Exhibition of various types of handiwork	Loaned by the Papakura Country Women's Institute	33 Coles Crescent
1984	July		Exhibition on the Plunket Society's work in childcare	In collaboration with the Plunket Society	33 Coles Crescent
1984		Drury Mineral Resources	Special display		33 Coles Crescent
1984	September 24	Nepal	This exhibition was a tribute to those who participated in the aid programme created by Sir Edmund Hillary to send people from Papakura to Nepal		33 Coles Crescent
1985		Pharmaceutical Equipment	Special display		33 Coles Crescent
1985		75 Years of Special Aviation	Special display		33 Coles Crescent
1986	December	Old Articles	Display on the 25th anniversary of the new Anglican church and the 125th anniversary of the establishment of the Anglican parish		33 Coles Crescent
1988	February 27 - March 6	Auckland Heritage Festival	Photographic display		
1990	Monthly	New Zealand 1990	Photographic window displays of Papakura throughout the years		Trust Bank
1990	Heritage Week	New Zealand 1990	Special window display		Westpac Bank
1992	February 4	Celebration of 110th Anniversary of Waitangi	Photographic displays in 4 bank and 7 shop windows for Waitangi		Local Papakura banks and shops
1992	February	Celebration of 110th Anniversary of Waitangi	Object displays in 5 banks and 10 shops for Waitangi		Local Papakura banks and shops
1993	September	Women's Suffrage Year	Display of artefacts	Loaned by the Quota Club of Papakura	Quota Club conference
1994	August	Year of the Family	Exhibition featuring birth to death and leisure activities		33 Cole Crescent
1995	Karaka Field Day		Exhibition of loaned artefacts	In collaboration with Papakura Enterprise Board and the Trust Bank	Karaka Field Day stall
2002	August	Racy	Exhibition about Papakura's significant pioneering contribution to New Zealand's horse racing industry		Access Point Building; Level 4
2011	February - March	Anne Frank	Exhibition on the progression of Nazi Germany alongside the story of Anne Frank's life	Travelling exhibition by the Anne Frank House, Amsterdam	Access Point Building; Level 3
2011	April - July	ANZAC	ANZAC military exhibition including memories of the Vietnam War, WWI artefacts from the private collection of Ian Hamilton, and the late Ian Bennett's war model collection	Featured artefacts from Ian Hamilton and Ian Bennett's personal collections	Access Point Building; Level 3
2011	August - September	Walsh Brothers	Photographic exhibition marking the centennial of the Walsh brothers' flight in Takanini		Access Point Building; Level 3
2011 - 2012	September - February	Open All Hours	Exhibition on the story of shops, businesses, and storekeepers of Papakura's main street from 1865 to 1938		Access Point Building; Level 3
2012	April	Home Fires Burning	Exhibition on New Zealand's involvement in the Vietnam War and the impact of the war on families and South Auckland communities	In collaboration with the Papakura Art Gallery	Access Point Building; Level 3
2012	July - September	London's Calling	Exhibition that included images, equipment, and memorabilia from a range of Olympic sports in celebration of the 2012 London Olympics		Access Point Building; Level 3
2012 - 2013	November - February	Sink or Swim	Exhibition on the history of bathing suits featuring examples from the last century		Access Point Building; Level 3
2013	March	Built for Justice	Photographic exhibition looking at old courthouse buildings throughout the North Island		Access Point Building; Level 3
2013	April - May	Mirror Magic	Fully interactive exhibition using mirrors to explore the science of reflections and reflected light		Access Point Building; Level 3
2013	June - July	In Our Backyard	Exhibition on the New Zealand Wars		Access Point Building; Level 3
2014	February - April	Treasures from the Past: Grandpa's Attic	Exhibition showcasing Ted Buising		Access Point Building; Level 3
2014	February - April	All Ablaze: Fire in Papakura	Exhibition about fire fighters and the community they serve		Access Point Building; Level 3
2014	May - June	ANZAC Tribute	Exhibition of Sandra Tolley's collection of ANZAC photographs featuring a painting display from the Papakura Art Group	Featured the private collection of Sandra Tolley and work from the Papakura Art Group	Access Point Building; Level 3
2014	August - October	Harnessed	Exhibition focused on the use of horses in battle during WWI	Loaned by Waiouru National Army Museum	Access Point Building; Level 3
2014 - 2015	October - January	Out in the Sticks	Exhibition featuring images from Les Everett's photographic collection and museum artefacts	Featured images from Les Everett's collection	Access Point Building; Level 3
2015	February - April	Waikato Immigration Scheme - 13 Ships			Access Point Building; Level 3
2015	May	As We Saw It	Exhibition on WWI featuring letters to and from the war front		Access Point Building; Level 3; Military Gallery
2015	August - October	Walsh Brothers to War Birds	Exhibition about the story of powered flight in Papakura		Access Point Building; Level 3
2015 - 2016	November - February	Putting on the Glitz	Exhibition showcasing women's clothing		Access Point Building; Level 3
2016	March - May	Art of War	Exhibition of 28 paintings from Greg Moyle's collection	Featured loaned paintings from collector Greg Moyle	Access Point Building; Level 3
2016	June - August	Open All Hours	The second edition of this exhibition on the story of shops, businesses, and storekeepers of Papakura's main street		Access Point Building; Level 3
2016	September	Awe and Respect			
2016	October	Papakura Walkaway Project	Display of 30 images with accompanying text in a covered walkway installed by the Papakura Local Board		Access Point Building; walkway entrance from Great South Road
2017	February	Ararimu 150 Display	Out-reach loan of artefacts and display material for Ararimu's celebrations of 150 years		
2017	February	Mayors of Papakura	Exhibition showcasing the Papakura Mayoral Chains and the history of the Papakura Mayoral position		Access Point Building; Level 3
2017	June - July	Balls, Bullets and Boots	Exhibition focussed on rugby during the war years	Travelling exhibition by the New Zealand Rugby Museum	Access Point Building; Level 3
2017	August - September	Mokaa: The Land of Opportunity: Indians in New Zealand	Exhibition celebrating 125 years of Indian New Zealanders	Curated by the New Zealand Indian Central Association	Access Point Building; Level 3
2017	August - October	The Spirit of ANZAC	Exhibition of New Zealand Post stamps and commemorative booklets		Access Point Building; Level 3
2017 - 2018	October - January	Ardmore Teachers Training College	Exhibition to commemorate 75 years since the college opened		Access Point Building; Level 3
2018	February - March	From This Day Forward	Exhibition featuring gowns donated to the museum in recognition of local romance from the 1920s - 1968		Access Point Building; Level 3
2018	March - December	Home Front	Exhibition about experience of WWI in New Zealand and how the war changed everyday life		Access Point Building; Level 3
2018	April - May	AWMM Centotaph Digitisation Unit [First Digital Exhibition]	Interactive online community cenotaph	Loaned by the Auckland War Memorial Museum	Access Point Building; Level 3
2018	June - July	New Zealand v France l'Histoire	Exhibition about he history of test matches between the All Blacks and France	Loaned by the New Zealand Rugby Museum and in collaboration with Papakura Rugby Football Club and the Papakura Business Association	Access Point Building; Level 3
2018	August - September	Mt Felix Tapestry	Exhibition of a community tapestry of 44 panels telling the story of some of the 27,000 wounded soldiers that were treated at the No. 2 General Hospital at Mt Felix in Walton-on-Thames during WWI	Travelling exhibition designed by Andrew Crummy in collaboration with the Riverhouse Barn Arts Centre	Access Point Building; Level 3
2018 - 2019	October - January	Influenza Epidemic 1918	Exhibition about how the community pulled together to fight a deadly virus		Access Point Building; Level 3
2018 - 2019	December - January	Papakura Art Gallery Display	Exhibition of Christmas themed paintings, tapestries, and quilting from local artists		Access Point Building; Level 3
2019	February - March	Built for Justice	The second edition of the photographic exhibition looking at old courthouse buildings throughout the North Island	Images and book courtesy of Terry Carson	Access Point Building; Level 3
2019	April - May	True Blue: A History of Papakura Police	Exhibition on Papakura's first police officers from 1861 featuring Ladies in Blue, types of police transport used over the years, murder in the district, and police in the community today		Access Point Building; Level 3
2019	June - July	The Delicate Balance of Wobbling Stars	Exhibition of stars woven from flax		Access Point Building; Level 3
2019	July - August	Looking Back 25 Years	Exhibition of images of Papakura taken 25 years earlier by Trefor Ward		Access Point Building; Level 3
2019	August - October	Farmers Papakura 100th Anniversary Exhibition	Exhibition in celebration of the opening of Farmers in Papakura		Access Point Building; Level 3
2019	October 14–31	Skateboard Design Exhibition	Exhibition of skateboards designed by Rosehill Year 11 Art and Design students to coincide with the 2020 Tokyo Olympics	Curated by Rosehill College Students	Access Point Building; Level 3
2019 - 2020	November - Late January	Tracks and Stations	Exhibition looking at the history of railway stations from Papatoetoe to Pukekohe		Access Point Building; Level 3
2020	late January - March	Public and Private: Photographs of People	Photographic exhibition	Loaned by the Museum of New Zealand Te Papa Tongarewa	Access Point Building; Level 3
2020	June - August	Kupe Sites	Exhibition of Great Voyager landmarks	Travelling exhibition from the Museum of New Zealand Te Papa Tongarewa	Access Point Building; Level 3
2020	September 7 - November 28	Art of War	Exhibition of war artists from the GJ Moyle collection	Loaned from the GJ Moyle Collection	Access Point Building; Level 3
2020 - 2021	December - late February	Buller's Birds	Photographic exhibition	Loaned from the Museum of New Zealand Te Papa Tongarewa	Access Point Building; Level 3
2020 - 2021	December - February	"Harakeke"	Papakura Museum kete were included in the "Harakeke" exhibition	Items loaned to the Papakura Art Gallery	Papakura Art Gallery
2021	March - July	Warbirds	Exhibition about warbirds	In collaboration with the Warbirds Association at Ardmore and Ardmore Airport Ltd	Access Point Building; Level 3
2021	July - September	Faka-Tokelau: Living with Change	Photographic exhibition exploring Tokelau's unique way of life through the lenses of two New Zealand photographers, Glenn Jowitt and Andrew Matautia	Loaned from the Museum of New Zealand Te Papa Tongarewa	Access Point Building; Level 3
2021 - 2022	December - February	Life is a Game - Play It	Exhibition of board games from those aimed at small children through to games for all ages		Access Point Building; Level 3
2022	February - early June	Mighty Small Mighty Bright	Exhibition of interactive science displays	Loaned from the Museum of Transport and Technology (MOTAT)	Access Point Building; Level 3
2022	August	Lens on Papakura	Exhibition of work by local photographers and photographic artefacts from the museum collection		Access Point Building; Level 3
2022	November	Ukraine Fragments	A feature of the exhibition 'Ukraine Fragments', this exhibit featured a series of laser-cut etchings and figures created by Auckland schoolteacher, Jan Ubels in response to images of the Russian attacks on Ukraine beginning on 25 February 2022.	Works created by Jan Ubels	Access Point Building; Level 3
2022 - 2023	December 1 - March 4	SOARING!	Exhibition about gliders and aviation with a focus on Papakura's unique connection to early aviation in Aotearoa	In collaboration with Auckland Gliding Club	Access Point Building; Level 3
2023	March 16 - June 13	Anne Frank: Let Me Be Myself	Exhibition on Anne Frank's life and the history of the Holocaust with connections to contemporary struggles of marginalised people in Aotearoa and around the world	Travelling exhibition by the Anne Frank House, Amsterdam in collaboration with the Holocaust Centre of New Zealand	Access Point Building; Level 3
2023	July 14 - October 13	Tūrama	Exhibition on Matariki featuring art from multiple artists including Lissy and Rudi Cole	Created by Hollie Tawhiao for the Papakura Museum	Access Point Building; Level 3
2023 - 2024	September 23 - October 2024	Home Fires Burning	Exhibition on New Zealand's involvement in the Vietnam War and the impact of the war on families and South Auckland communities	Put on alongside a talk with three veterans of the conflict as part of the Auckland heritage festival	Access Point Building; Level 3; Military Gallery
2023 - 2024	November 2 - March	Old School Tech	Interactive exhibition about how technology has changed over the 20th and 21st Centuries	Curated by Anna Part with the help of Wendy Deeming and Kara Oosterman based on an idea from museum curator Alan Knowles	Access Point Building; Level 3
2024	April 1 - May 25	Violet's Scarf	Exhibition based on the children's book, Violet's Scarf, by author Colleen Brown. The exhibition and book are based on a true story about a girl from New Zealand, WWI, and the international journey of a hand-knitted scarf.		Access Point Building; Level 3
2024	August 3–30	Solar Tsunamis - Parawhenua Koomaru	Interactive science exhibit about space weather, aurora, and electricity aimed at children.	On loan from the Tūhura Otago Museum	Access Point Building; Level 3
2024 - 2025	September 3 - January 31	Dearly Beloved	Exhibition on the history of the Anglican, Methodist, Presbyterian and Catholic churches in Papakura.	Curated by Tyler Ross-Doone with items on loan from Papakura churches.	Access Point Building; Level 3

== Publications ==
The museum has been involved in the creation of several publications.

To coincide with the opening of the fire station location of the museum, Breakwater Against the Tide was published. The author, Elsdon Craig, details the history of Papakura. Two years later in 1984, the museum published the first edition of Town Growing Up by Ernest Clarke, with a second edition published in 1993. In 1986, Clarke edited They Come and They Go which was a booklet published by the PDHS. Then in 1990, Big Hats, Scent Pots and Old Joe was published in conjunction with the Papakura Council for the New Zealand 1990 Project. In 1995, Papakura was declared a borough of Auckland, and the PDHS proposed that there should be a compiled history of the district from 1938 to the present. In 1997, Papakura: The Years of Progress 1938 - 1997 was published to chronicle Papakura history starting with the population explosion that happened when men returning from WWII brought their families to the area.

In 2011, the first edition of Open All Hours; Main Street Papakura c1865 - c1938 by Dr Michelle Ann Smith was published by the museum. This publication looks at the importance of the town's main street, as well as including information and anecdotes about some of the business owners and workers. The second edition was published in 2016. The next publications in 2015, Thirteen Ships - The Waikato Immigration Scheme, 1864 - 1865 and "Digging Up the Past: Papakura Cemetery Heritage Walk", were both published as part of the Auckland Council Heritage Festival that year. In 2016, Dr Michelle Smith published "About Town - Heritage Walk, Great South Road, Papakura" which was supplemented by a guided walking brochure that Rob Finlay created for the previous year's Heritage Festival.

In 2020, a companion booklet was created for the 'Art of War' exhibit. The next year Alibi Press published a children's book called The Takapuna Tram. Collated by Terry Carson, a poem by Elizabeth Welsman Dawson was used with illustrations by Elva Leaming. The book was designed by Anna Egan-Reid and produced by Mary Egan Publishing. In 2022, "Lens on Papakura" was published as a companion book to the temporary exhibition of the same name that was held at the museum during the same time.

== See also ==
- Papakura District
- Papakura Train Station
