= Papakura =

- Suburb
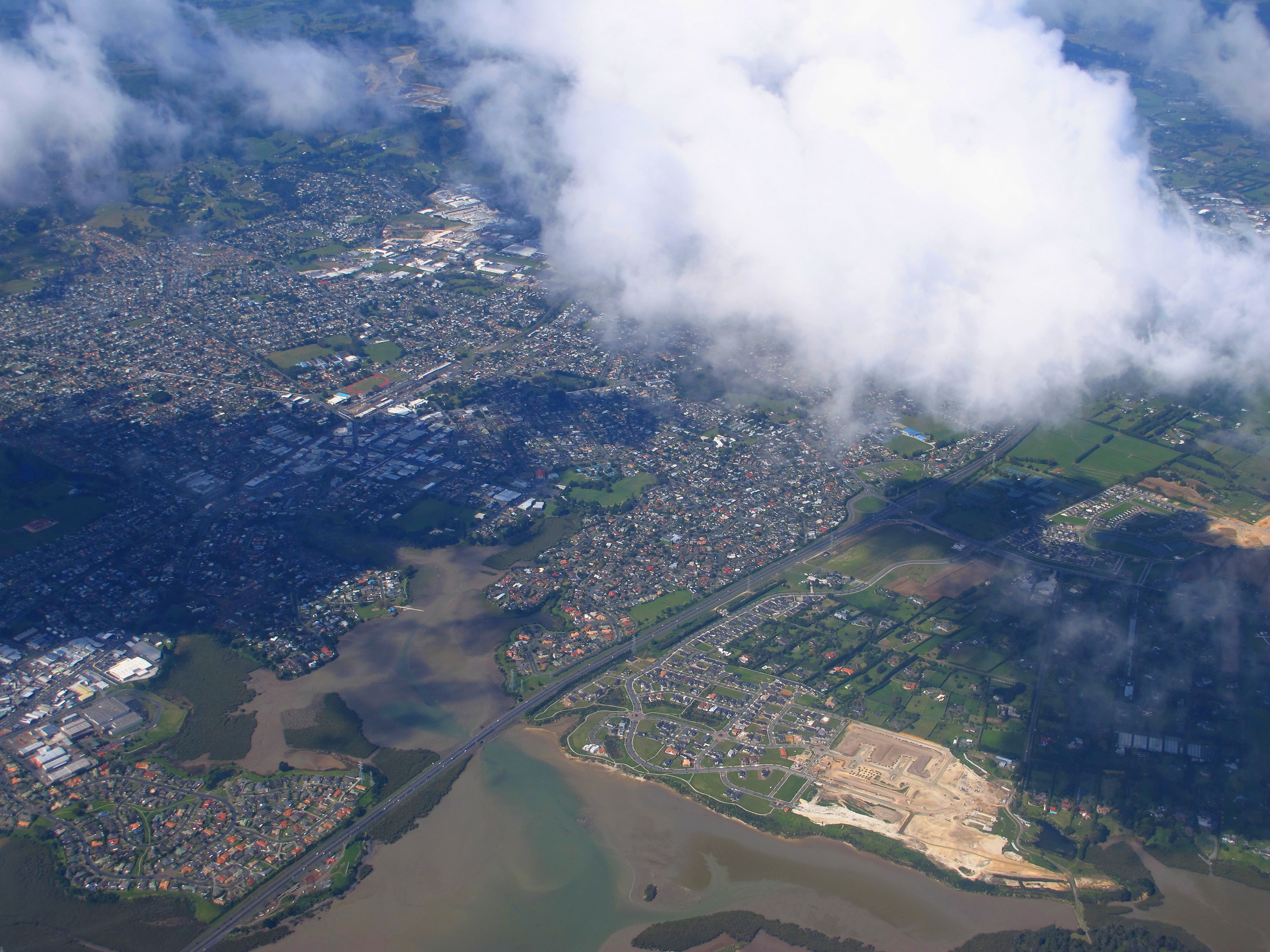
- Aerial view of Papakura and the Auckland Southern Motorway
- Interactive map of Papakura
- Coordinates: 37°3′45″S 174°56′31″E
- Country: New Zealand
- City: Auckland
- Local authority: Auckland Council
- Electoral ward: Manurewa-Papakura ward
- Local board: Papakura Local Board
- Established: 1846

Area
  - Land: 1,291 ha (3,190 acres)

Population (June 2025)
  - Total: 37,720
  - Density: 2,922/km^{2} (7,567/sq mi)
- Train stations: Papakura railway station
- Hospitals: Counties Manukau District Health Board

Wattle Downs	Takanini	Ardmore
Pahurehure	Papakura	Red Hill
Rosehill	Drury	Ōpaheke

Papakura is a suburb of South Auckland, in northern New Zealand. It is located on the shores of the Pahurehure Inlet, approximately 32 kilometres (20 mi) south of the Auckland City Centre. It is under the authority of the Auckland Council.

The area was settled by Tāmaki Māori in the 13th or 14th centuries, who utilised the resources of the Hunua Ranges and Manukau Harbour. A defensive pā was constructed on Pukekiwiriki, and the surrounding area developed into gardens. By the latter 18th century, the tribal identities of Te Ākitai Waiohua, Ngāti Tamaoho and Ngāti Te Ata Waiohua began developing, among Waiohua descendant iwi of the Manukau Harbour, who lived seasonally in the Papakura area.

The first permanent European residents moved to Papakura in 1846. The town developed significantly during the construction of the Great South Road, and was a military outpost during the Invasion of the Waikato. During the latter 19th century, Papakura became a centre for the kauri gum trade, logging and later dairy farming. In 1938, the town had grown enough to become the Borough of Papakura, independent from the surrounding Manukau County.

From the 1950s, Papakura and the surrounding areas urbanised, in part due to the construction of the Auckland Southern Motorway. By 1987, Papakura had become a part of the greater urban sprawl of Auckland. In 1975, Papakura became a city, but lost this status in 1989 due to local government reforms.

== Etymology ==
Papakura is a Māori language word typically translated to mean "Red Earth" or "Red Flats". While kura is usually interpreted to be a reference to the red soil of the area, ethnographer George Graham offers an alternative translation of Papakura, "Flat of the Moa". Graham believed that kura was a reference to the North Island giant moa (kuranui), known for its red plumage, that could come down from the Papakura Hills to feed in the Papakura lowlands. A name associated with the location of the modern township of Papakura is Wharekawa, while the Coles Crescent area adjacent to the Pahurehure Inlet was known as Waipapa.

== Geography ==
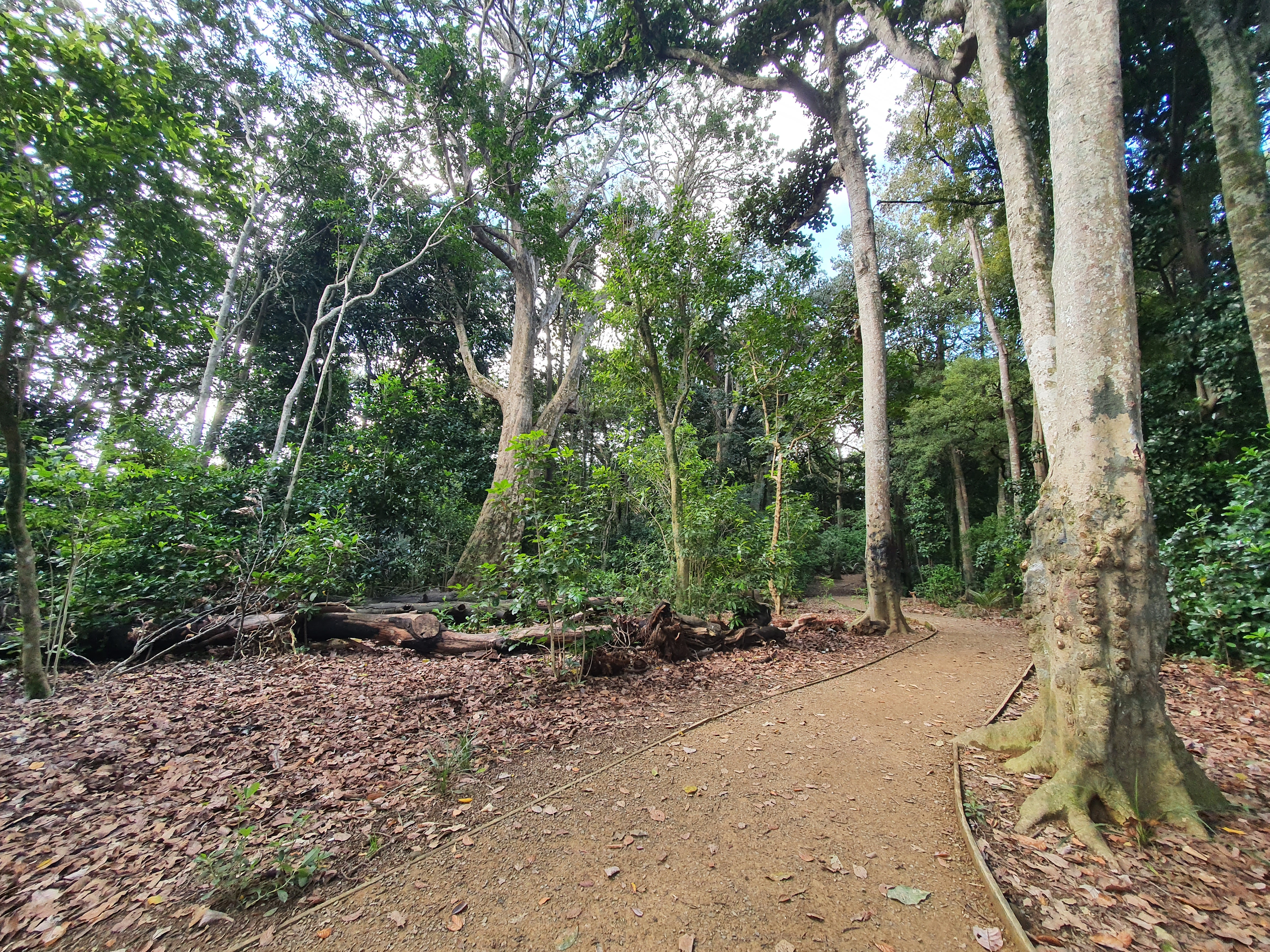
Kirk's Bush is a remnant of the dense native forest formerly found across southern Papakura and Drury

Papakura is located on the shores of the Pahurehure Inlet, a southeastern inlet of the Manukau Harbour. It is located between the suburb of Takanini to the north, and the rural settlements of Drury to the south and Karaka to the west. Papakura is surrounded by Pahurehure, Rosehill, Ōpaheke and Red Hill, variously considered independent suburbs or as areas within Papakura.

To the east of Papakura is Pukekiwiriki, a basalt volcano within the South Auckland volcanic field that erupted an estimated 1,000,000 years ago. Lava flows from the eruption flowed west towards Papakura. Further east of Papakura are the Hunua Ranges, a regional park in the Auckland and Waikato regions.

Before the arrival of humans, northern Papakura and Takanini were predominantly wetlands and peat bogs, while southern Papakura and Drury was home to a dense kauri-dominated forest. Kirks Bush in Papakura is a remnant of this forest.

== History ==
=== Māori history ===
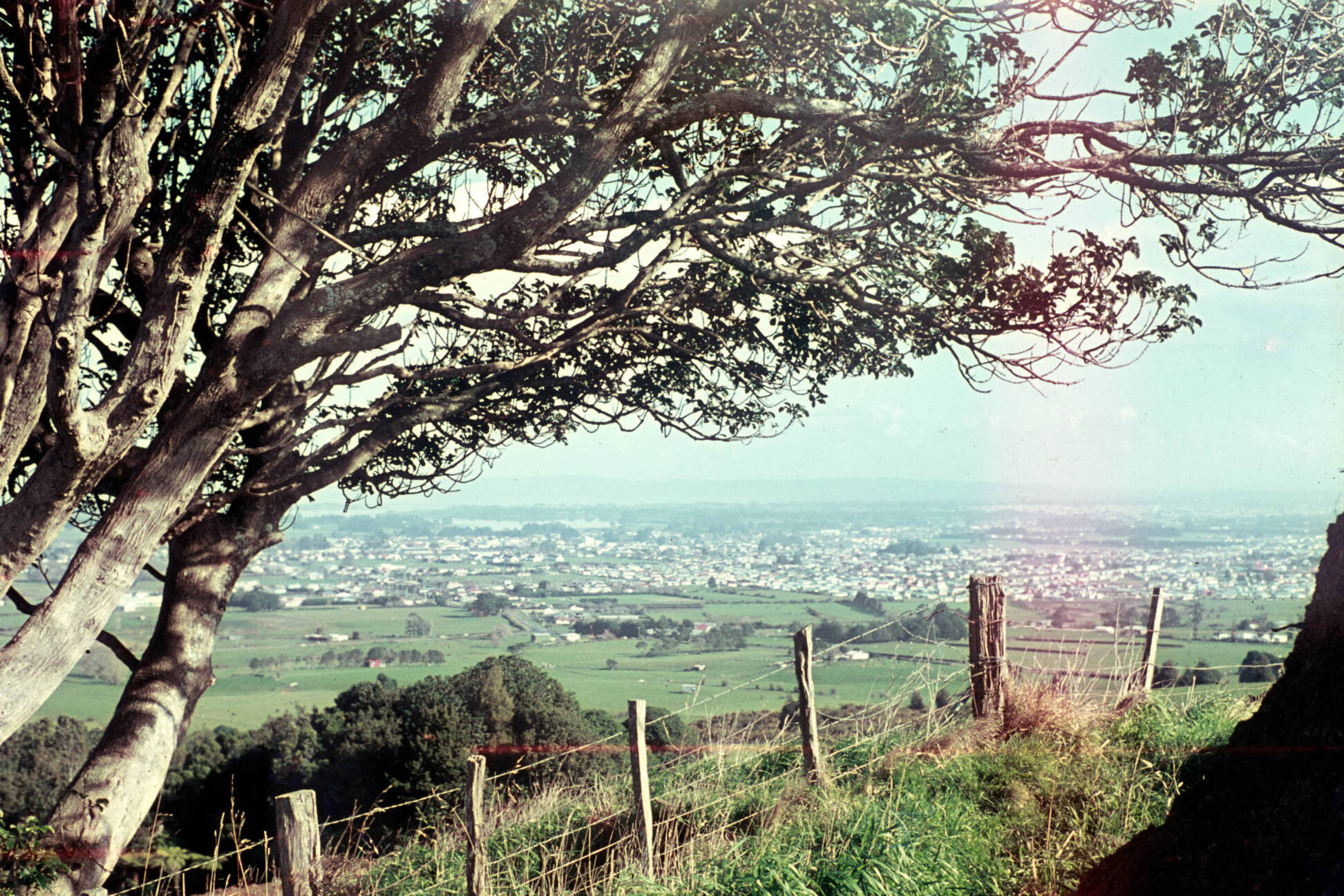
Pukekiwiriki (also known as Pukekoiwiriki and Red Hill) was the location of a defended pā site, which protected the kāinga and gardens surrounding Pukekiwiriki (pictured: view from Red Hill in the 1960s)

The Auckland Region has been settled by Māori since around the 13th or 14th centuries. Many Māori migration canoes visited the wider area, including the Matahourua, Aotea, Mātaatua, Tainui, Tākitimu, Tokomaru, Te Wakatūwhenua and Moekākara. Papakura was the location of the Papakura portage, which allowed people to haul waka between the southeastern Manukau Harbour at Papakura in the west to the Wairoa River in the east, likely along the path of the Old Wairoa Road. Other inland ara ("trails") existed between the Pahurehure Inlet, connecting to the Waikato in the south.

Pukekiwiriki has been occupied since the arrival of migratory waka, and is associated with the Tainui ancestress Mārama, who was the second wife of Hoturoa, captain of the Tainui waka. She settled permanently at the pā after quarrelling with Hoturoa. The site became a home for the Tāmaki Māori people who descended from her, known as Ngā Mārama, who later became a part of the Waiohua confederation.

The Papakura area was home to the kāinga of Kirikiri, Te Aparangi and Ōpaheke, which were protected by the fortified pā at Pukekiwiriki, and by Te Maketū pā to the south. Tāmaki Māori of the Papakura area thrived by utilising the resources of the Manukau Harbour, forests of the Hunua Ranges and by creating large-scale gardens, primarily on the slopes of Pukekiwiriki.

==== Waiohua and the Musket Wars ====
Over time, the tribal identities of Ngā Iwi and Ngā Riki emerged, primarily for those who descended from the Tainui and Arawa waka. In the 17th century, three major tribes of Tāmaki Makaurau, Ngā Iwi, Ngā Oho and Ngā Riki, joined to form Waiōhua, led by the rangatira Huakaiwaka. The union lasted for three generations, and was centred around the pā of Maungawhau and later Maungakiekie on the Auckland isthmus.

Around the year 1740, a conflict between Ngāti Whātua and Waiohua led to the death of paramount chief Kiwi Tāmaki. Many Waiohua of the isthmus and South Auckland area sought refuge with their Waikato Tainui relatives to the south. Waiohua gradually returned to the southern Manukau Harbour, including Papakura, living in dispersed villages based on seasonally available resources. During this time, the tribal identities of Te Ākitai Waiohua, Ngāti Tamaoho and Ngāti Te Ata Waiohua developed.

In the 1820s, the threat of Ngāpuhi war parties from the north during the Musket Wars caused the Papakura area to become deserted. Waiohua descendant tribes relocated to the Waikato under the protection of Pōtatau Te Wherowhero, returning gradually during the early 1830s. By 1835, Te Ākitai Waiohua had reestablished a presence at Kirikiri, a kāinga on the western slopes of Pukekiwiriki.

Modern-day iwi and hapū who associate with the Papakura area include Te Ākitai Waiohua, Ngāti Tamaoho, Ngāti Te Ata Waiohua, Ngāi Tai ki Tāmaki and Waikato Tainui hapū Ngāti Pou.

=== Early colonial period ===
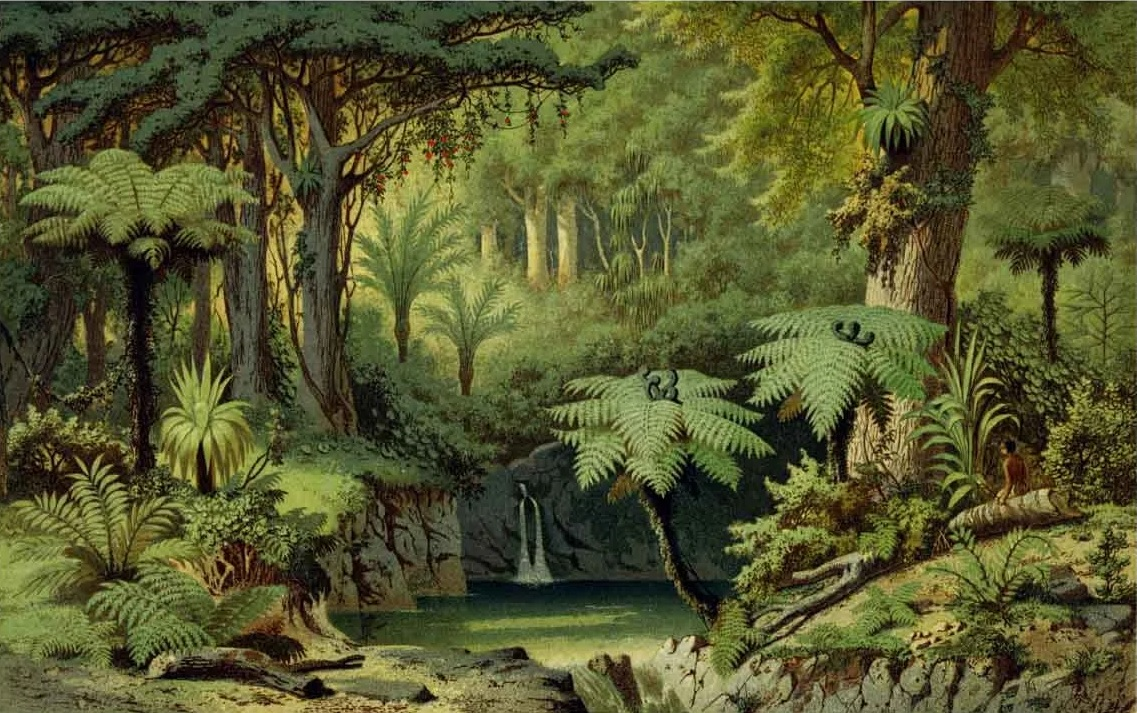
Drawing by Carl Frank Fischer of the forests near Papakura in the 1850s

In January 1842, the Crown purchased the Papakura block from Ngāti Taihaua, a hapū with ties to Ngāi Tai and Te Ākitai Waiohua, that included rangatira Īhaka Takaanini. The area had not been surveyed before purchase, and its estimated size ranges from 9,000 acres (3,600 ha) to 30,000 acres (12,000 ha). The crown created a reserve for Te Ākitai Waiohua to the south of Papakura.

The first European settler mentioned in newspapers is George Rich, who is described as farming and hunting wild boars at Papakura in 1844. The first permanent European residents of Papakura were the McLennan, Cole and Willis families, who arrived between 1846 and 1848 to establish farms at Papakura. Welsh immigrant George Cole became known as the "father of Papakura" in later years, and is remembered by the name of a street in Papakura, Coles Crescent. The tract of land that was initially purchased was subdivided in 1853, with the street layout that was built initially remaining largely in place today. Cole established an inn for travellers in the Papakura area.

==== Great South Road and the Invasion of the Waikato ====
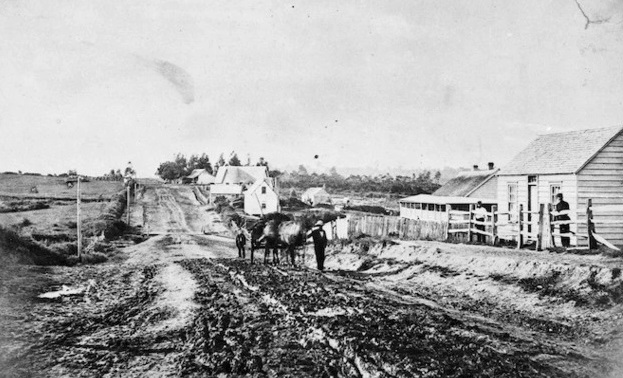
Great South Road at Papakura, photographed between 1863 and 1867

In 1861, Governor George Grey ordered the construction of the Great South Road further into the Waikato, due to fears of potential invasion of Waikato Tainui and concerns about the Māori King Movement. The road preceded despite objections from Te Ākitai Waiohua to having the road constructed through their lands.

The construction of Great South Road led to a population boom in Papakura, which became a military outpost staging point for the war. Many soldiers lived in Papakura village or camped in the surrounding area, and businesses made profit by serving the soldiers. On 9 July 1863, due to fears of the Māori King Movement, Governor Grey proclaimed that all Māori living in the South Auckland area needed to swear loyalty to the Queen and give up their weapons. Most people refused due to strong links to Tainui, leaving for the south before the Government's Invasion of the Waikato. Small numbers of people remained, in order to tend to their farms and for ahi kā (land rights through continued occupation). Most Māori occupants of the Papakura area felt they had no choice due to their strong ties to Tainui and Pōtatau Te Wherowhero, and were forced to flee to the Waikato in the south. While fleeing, Te Ākitai Waiohua rangatira Ihaka Takanini and his family were captured by his former neighbour, Lieutenant-Colonel Marmaduke Nixon, and taken prisoner on Rakino Island, where Ihaka Takanini died.

By 1864, the battlefront of the war had moved south of Papakura. The military barracks and stables in the town were disbanded, and local residents struggled, no longer able to supply the soldiers. After the war, the Crown confiscated 1.2 million acres of Māori land around the Waikato, including Waiohua land at Papakura. The former residents of the Manukau Harbour began returning to the area in 1866, with the Native Compensation Court returning small portions of land in 1867. Most land was kept by the crown as reserves, or sold on to British immigrant farmers. This included land in Papakura that was promoted to European farming families, who arrived in the mid-1860s.

=== Growing township of Papakura ===
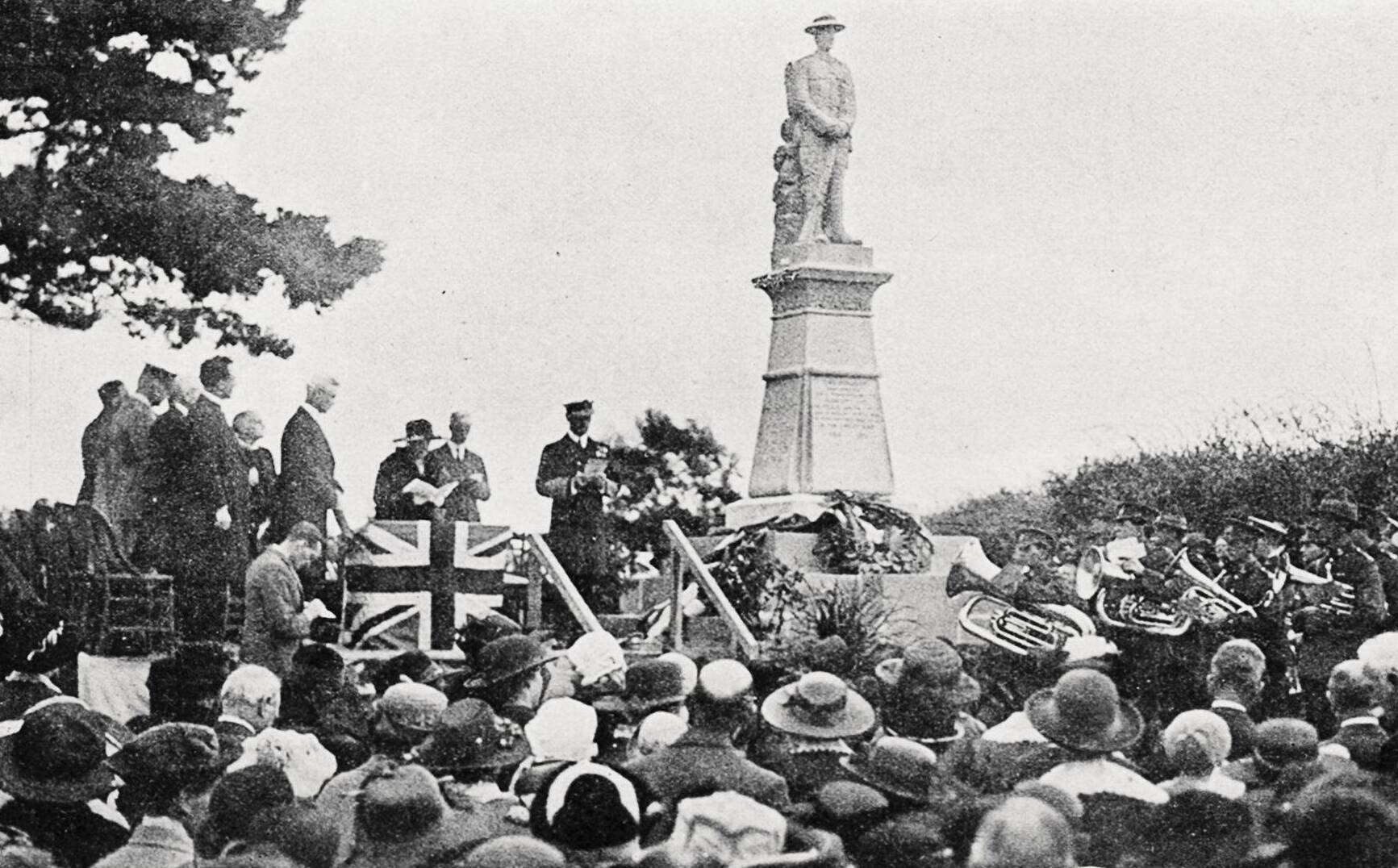
The unveiling of the Papakura-Karaka war memorial statue in 1921

The village of Papakura grew in the 1860s and 1870s, with early industries including logging, farming, kauri gum digging, farming, and providing services for travellers along the Great South Road. By the early 1870s, the Papakura Hotel and Globe Hotel had become prominent structures in the town. In 1875, Papakura railway station opened, linking the town to Auckland to the north and Hamilton to the south. The opening of the railway station helped grow the profitability of dairy farming, which became a major industry in Papakura in the 1880s. By 1882, Papakura had grown enough to become a town district.

The 1890s saw a major increase in kauri gum diggers visiting Papakura and Takanini, many of whom were Māori and Dalmatian immigrants. Papakura township was adjacent to the large Ardmore Gumfield (also known as the Papakura Gumfield), which stretched from Manurewa to Clevedon. By the 1900s, the gumfields started being converted into farmland and orchards.

In 1911, the first controlled powered flight in New Zealand took place in Papakura. The flight took place inside a single paddock within the racecourse of the now-defunct Papakura Racing Club. The flight was piloted by Vivian Walsh and was carried out in a Howard Wright 1910 Biplane, the parts for which were imported from England in 1910 and assembled by members of the Auckland Aeroplane Syndicate.

Papakura struggled to grow as a community between 1900 and 1919, due to repeated fires breaking out in the community, as well as the effects of World War I and the 1918–1920 flu pandemic. By 1914, the town had grown to have a population of 700. After the war, the Papakura Town District unveiled a memorial statue in 1921. The town flourished in the 1920s. By 1936 the population had grown to 1,793, and in 1938, the area had grown enough that Papakura became an independent borough.

The Papakura Military Camp was established on the outskirts of the town in 1939 and remains an important base for the New Zealand Army, being the home of the New Zealand Special Air Service. The camp was initially built by the Stevenson family construction business.

=== Suburbanisation ===
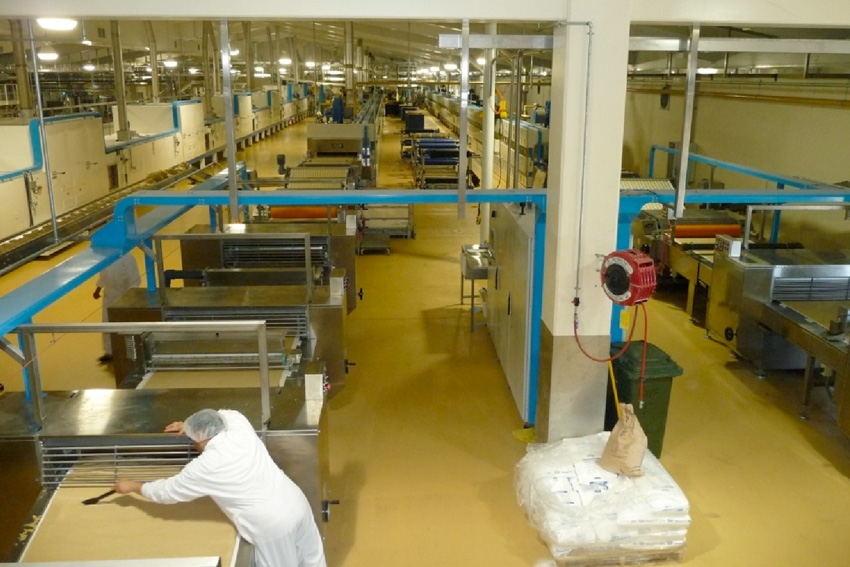
Workers at the Griffin's biscuit factory in 2019

In the years after World War II, South Auckland saw significant housing and industrial developments. By 1964, Manurewa, Takanini and Papakura had grown into a single contiguous urban area, and by 1987 Papakura had become a part of the urban sprawl of Auckland.

Many people drawn to Papakura due to the Papakura cattle stockyards, which were established in 1955. The Auckland Southern Motorway was developed gradually in sections, with the motorway over the Pahurehure Inlet at Papakura opening in 1965. By the mid-20th century horse breeding became common, and as the motorway was being constructed, industrial businesses were established in the Takanini and Papakura areas. In 1965 a Cadbury chocolate factory opened on Hunua Road in Papakura, which later became the Griffin's biscuit factory. The Roselands shopping centre opened in Papakura in 1968.

Due to significant growth, the Borough of Papakura became Papakura City in 1975.

== Demographics ==
Papakura covers 12.91 km^{2} (4.98 sq mi) and had an estimated population of 37,720 as of June 2025, with a population density of 2,922 people per km^{2}.

Historical population
Year	Pop.	±% p.a.
2006	17,667	—
2013	20,442	+2.11%
2018	24,192	+3.43%
2023	31,929	+5.71%
The 2006 population is for a smaller area of 10.34 km^{2}. Source:

Papakura had a population of 31,929 in the 2023 New Zealand census, an increase of 7,737 people (32.0%) since the 2018 census, and an increase of 11,487 people (56.2%) since the 2013 census. There were 15,810 males, 16,044 females and 72 people of other genders in 9,507 dwellings. 2.5% of people identified as LGBTIQ+. The median age was 31.0 years (compared with 38.1 years nationally). There were 8,085 people (25.3%) aged under 15 years, 7,194 (22.5%) aged 15 to 29, 14,115 (44.2%) aged 30 to 64, and 2,535 (7.9%) aged 65 or older.

People could identify as more than one ethnicity. The results were 32.9% European (Pākehā); 30.3% Māori; 24.7% Pasifika; 30.4% Asian; 1.7% Middle Eastern, Latin American and African New Zealanders (MELAA); and 1.6% other, which includes people giving their ethnicity as "New Zealander". English was spoken by 91.1%, Māori language by 6.7%, Samoan by 6.2%, and other languages by 24.4%. No language could be spoken by 3.7% (e.g. too young to talk). New Zealand Sign Language was known by 0.5%. The percentage of people born overseas was 34.6, compared with 28.8% nationally.

Religious affiliations were 35.3% Christian, 8.3% Hindu, 2.6% Islam, 2.6% Māori religious beliefs, 1.1% Buddhist, 0.3% New Age, and 7.3% other religions. People who answered that they had no religion were 36.4%, and 6.5% of people did not answer the census question.

Of those at least 15 years old, 4,662 (19.6%) people had a bachelor's or higher degree, 11,034 (46.3%) had a post-high school certificate or diploma, and 8,151 (34.2%) people exclusively held high school qualifications. The median income was $41,600, compared with $41,500 nationally. 1,683 people (7.1%) earned over $100,000 compared to 12.1% nationally. The employment status of those at least 15 was that 12,699 (53.3%) people were employed full-time, 2,238 (9.4%) were part-time, and 1,350 (5.7%) were unemployed.

Individual statistical areas
Name	Area (km^{2})	Population	Density (per km^{2})	Dwellings	Median age	Median income
Takanini South East	0.83	2,397	2,888	681	30.0 years	$56,700
Takanini McLennan	0.64	2,568	4,013	789	29.9 years	$46,800
Papakura West	0.56	1,914	3,418	669	36.0 years	$35,600
Papakura North	1.01	3,708	3,671	1,176	31.4 years	$44,000
Papakura Central	1.57	3,684	2,346	1,410	34.5 years	$37,100
Papakura North East	0.56	2,304	4,114	678	30.2 years	$39,700
Twin Parks Rise	0.93	2,550	2,742	648	32.0 years	$55,700
Papakura Kelvin	0.49	2,262	4,616	657	30.1 years	$38,400
Papakura Eastburn	0.76	3,411	4,488	849	27.0 years	$30,700
Papakura Massey Park	0.89	2,979	3,347	837	30.0 years	$34,600
Papakura East	0.63	3,042	4,829	774	30.0 years	$39,300
Harbour View Heights	2.50	912	365	282	34.1 years	$54,100
Papakura Industrial	1.54	201	131	63	34.6 years	$32,400
New Zealand					38.1 years	$41,500

== Education ==
Papakura High School is a secondary school (years 9–13) with a roll of 1,337. The school was established in 1954. In 2020, Māori students were 59% of the roll and Pacific Islands students were 29%. Papakura Intermediate is an intermediate school (years 7–8) with a roll of 313. The school opened in 1962. From 2000 to 2017 it was called Mansell Senior School. In 2018, Māori students were 74% of the roll and Pacific Islands students were 22%.

Papakura Normal School and Edmund Hillary School are full primary schools (years 1–8) with rolls of 768 and 189 students, respectively. Papakura Normal opened as Papakura North School in 1953, and changed to its current name when it affiliated to Ardmore Teachers College in 1958. Edmund Hillary opened in 1963. Its name pays tribute to the mountaineer.

Papakura Central School, Kelvin Road School and Cosgrove School are contributing primary schools (years 1–6) with rolls of 447, 542 and 604 students, respectively. Papakura Central traces its origins back to 1876. Kelvin Road opened in 1968. Cosgrove opened in 1959.

All these schools are coeducational. Rolls are as of July 2026.

== Local government ==
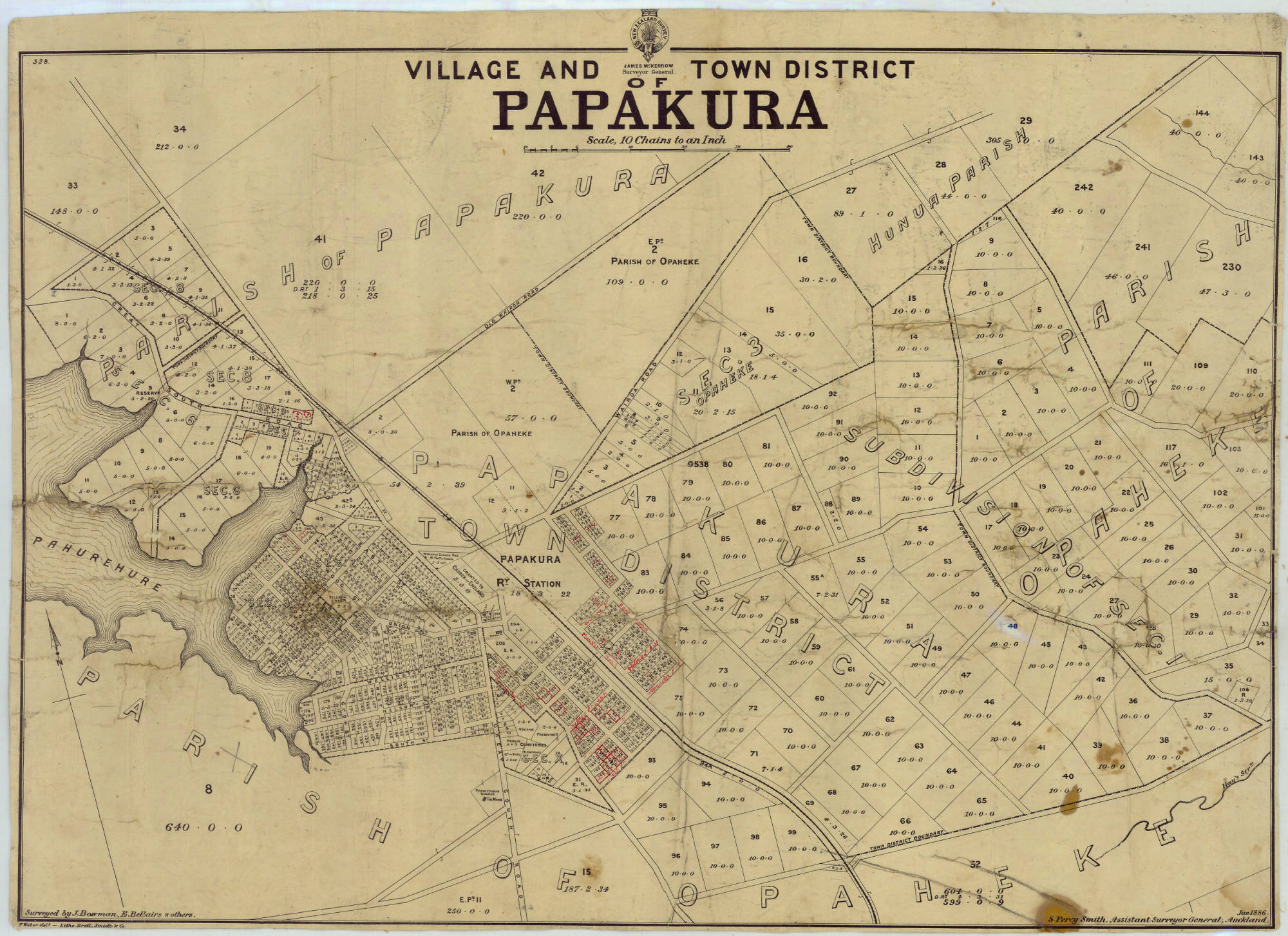
Map of the Town District of Papakura in 1882

Road boards were the first local government in South Auckland in the 1860s, which were established across the Auckland Province due to a lack of central government funding for road improvements. The Hunua Highway Board was established in 1867, and in 1886 Papakura became a part of the Opaheke North Road Board.

In 1876, the Manukau County was established as the local government for South Auckland. In 1881, the Town District Act allowed communities of more than 50 households to amalgamate into a town district. Large town districts were able to form boroughs, which had their own councils and a greater lending power. On 17 August 1882, Papakura became a town district within the Manukau County. On 1 April 1938, Papakura had grown in population enough that the town became independent from the Manukau County, becoming Papakura Borough. The boroughs boundaries were expanded in 1962 (12 acres (4.9 ha)) and 1966 (1,300 acres (530 ha), 500 residents) from part of Franklin County.

In the early 1960s, a movement began to amalgamate the various town and borough councils in South Auckland into a single city, which became known as the Manukau City. Papakura did not become a part of this amalgamation. On 1 January 1975, growth in the area led the Borough of Papakura to become Papakura City. With the local government reforms in 1989, Papakura City was dissolved, becoming Papakura District.

On 1 November 2010, the local government authorities of the Auckland Region were merged with the surrounding areas of Auckland to form a single local government area, managed by the Auckland Council as a unitary authority. The Papakura Local Board was established as a part of these reforms, which administers the Papakura local board area, an area with similar boundaries as the former Papakura District. Papakura is a part of the Manurewa-Papakura ward, an area that elects two councillors to the Auckland Council.

=== Mayors of Papakura ===
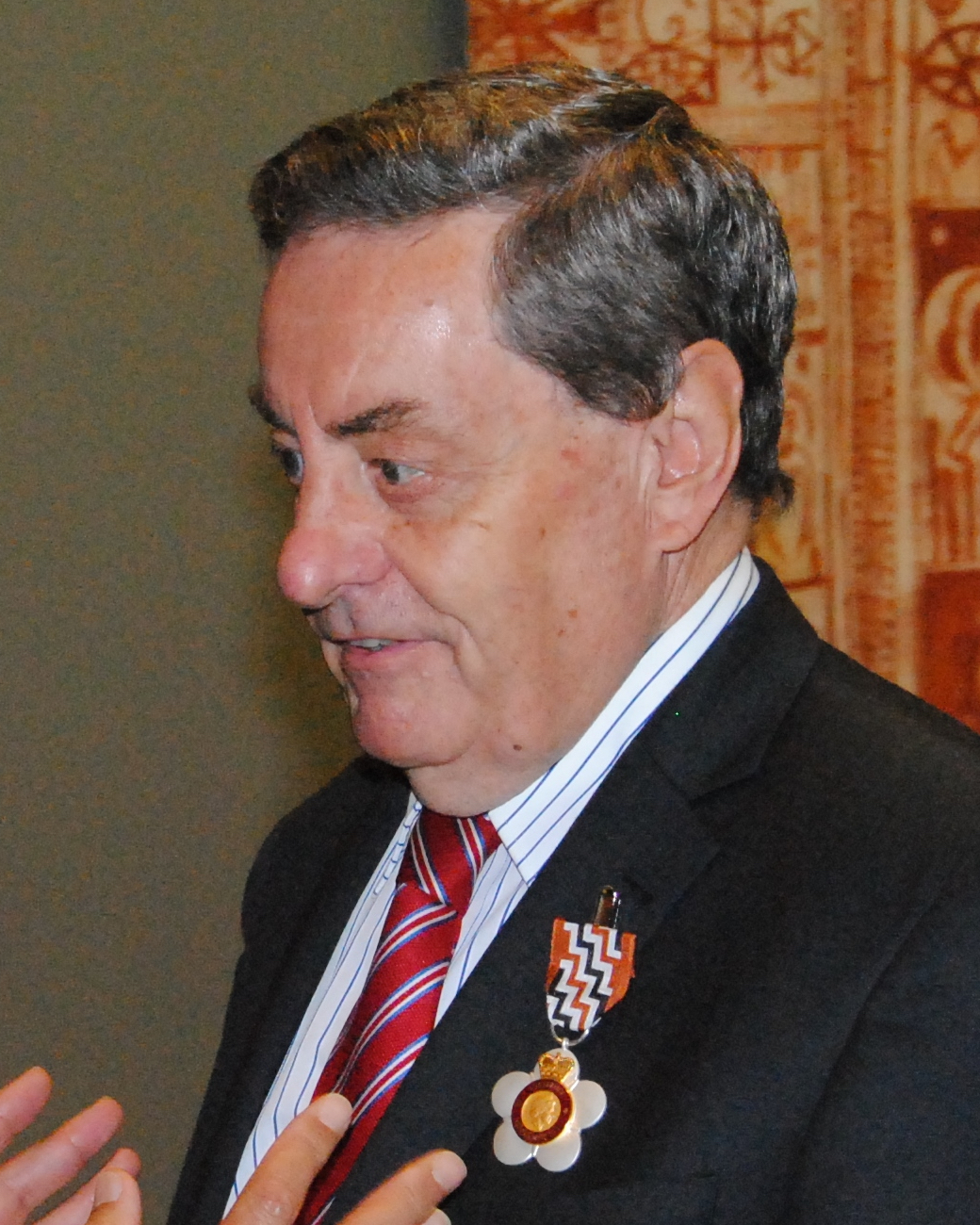
George Hawkins served as the last Mayor of Papakura City from 1983–1989, and the first Mayor of Papakura District from 1989–1992

Papakura has had 10 people serve as mayor between 1938 and 2010, variously as the Mayor of Papakura Borough, Mayor of Papakura City and Mayor of Papakura District.

==== Papakura Borough Council ====
- 1938–1947 Samuel Evans
- 1947–1953 Edward ('Ted') A. J. Busing
- 1953–1966 Isaac ('Ike') Grundy Mack
- 1966–1975 Archibald J. Campbell

==== Papakura City Council ====
- 1975–1977 Archibald J. Campbell
- 1977–1983 Jack Farrell
- 1983–1989 George Hawkins

==== Papakura District Council ====
- 1989–1992 George Hawkins
- 1992–2000 David Hawkins
- 2000–2004 David Buist
- 2004–2007 John Robertson
- 2007–2010 Calum Penrose

== Facilities ==
=== Government ===
In addition to the Local Council Chambers, Papakura is served by a large police station (one of Auckland's busiest), a District Court, and a WINZ office. In the Pitcairn sexual assault trial of 2004, the Papakura Courthouse was where the Pitcairn Supreme Court sat to hear the case.

=== Armed forces ===
Papakura once served a large military population, but now only the SAS special forces are based at Papakura. Nearby houses were originally Army Homes, but are now in private hands. The army base was made much smaller in the 2010s and become a residential area for a large number of modern houses, both detached and terraced. The subdivision is called McLennan Housing Development next to McLennan Park, home of Papakura Football Club. McLennan being the name of the farming brothers that first settled in the area from Scotland.

=== Transport ===
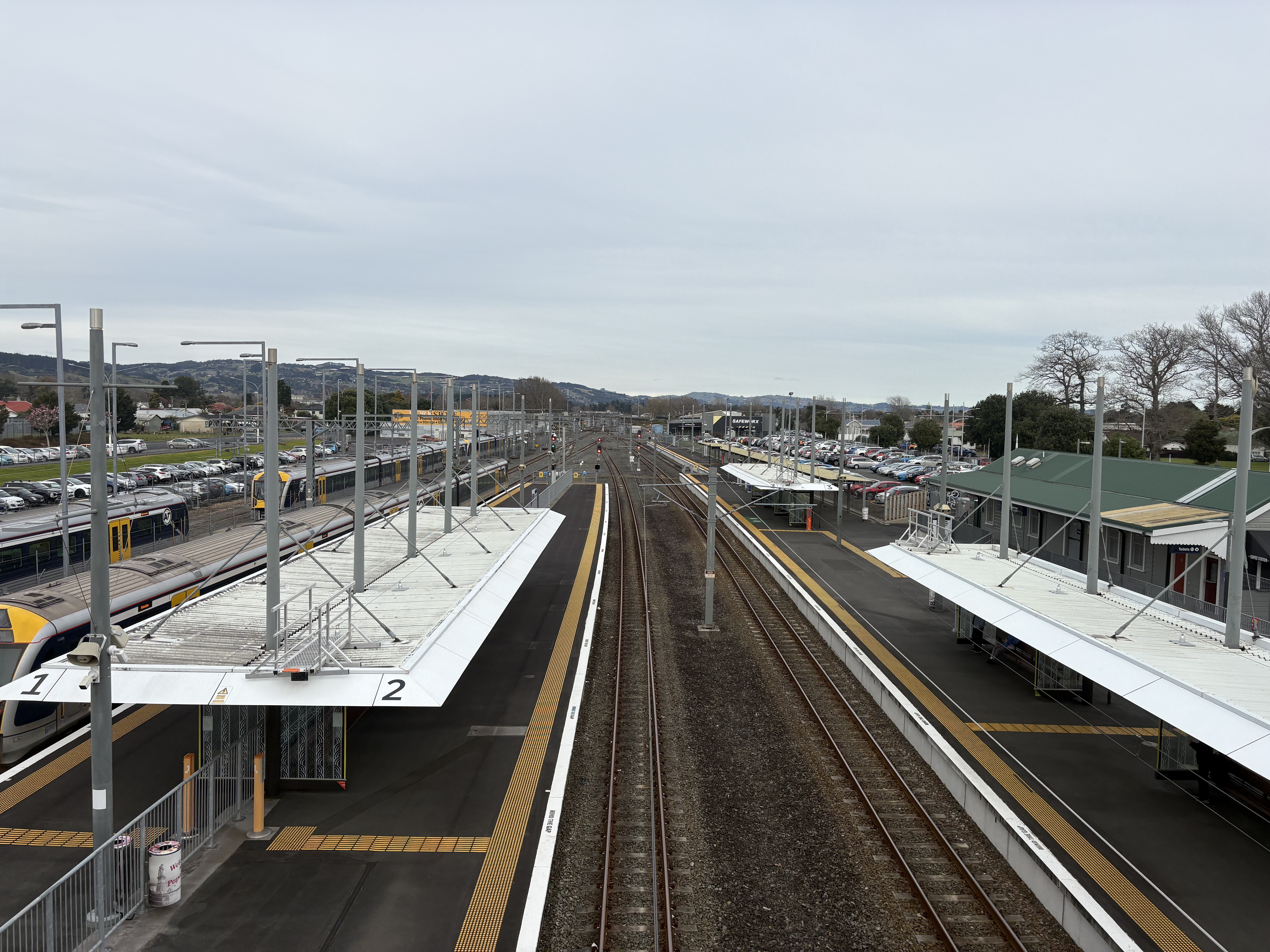
Overview of Papakura railway station

State Highway 1 and the North Island Main Trunk railway run through the Papakura District. State Highway 1 ran down Great South Road through central Papakura until 1965, when it was bypassed by the Auckland Southern Motorway. In 2021, the Southern Path, a cycling and walking path linking Takanini to Karaka adjacent to the Southern Motorway was opened.

Public transport is provided by train and bus services, with frequent trains on the South City Line between Papakura and the Auckland City Centre. Papakura is the third busiest station on the rail network. Recent investment has focused on upgrading and refurbishing the region's trains and suburban railway stations, most recently with the opening of a modern station facility at the town centre. Drawn by frequent services into and out of the city, rail commuters come from Papakura itself, Franklin and the northern Waikato. Though the motorway and Great South Road flow relatively freely at peak times, road commuters are affected by the acute traffic congestion as they get closer to metropolitan Auckland.

Between 2021 and 2025, Papakura was a stop for the Te Huia regional train service between Hamilton and Auckland until Pukekohe railway station reopened after electrification.

=== Sport and recreation ===
Some notable sports facilities include an indoor-outdoor swimming pool, an international-quality athletics track, a sports stadium, and venues for rugby, netball, cricket, golf, tennis, badminton, soccer, and many other sports. The council also operates a library and a theatre. Papakura also has a number of skate parks, and a skate bowl.

Papakura is home to association football club Papakura City, who compete in the Lotto Sport Italia NRFL Division 2, rugby union club Papakura RFC who are members of the Counties Manukau Rugby Union, rugby league club Papakura Sea Eagles, who compete in the Auckland Rugby League's Fox Memorial competition (division 1), and Papakura Cricket Club who compete in the Counties Manukau Cricket Association competition. Papakura and the surrounding area is represented by the Counties Manukau Steelers in first-class rugby union and Northern Districts in first-class cricket.

=== Museum ===
The Papakura Museum showcases the area's local history. It opened in 1972.

== Notable features ==
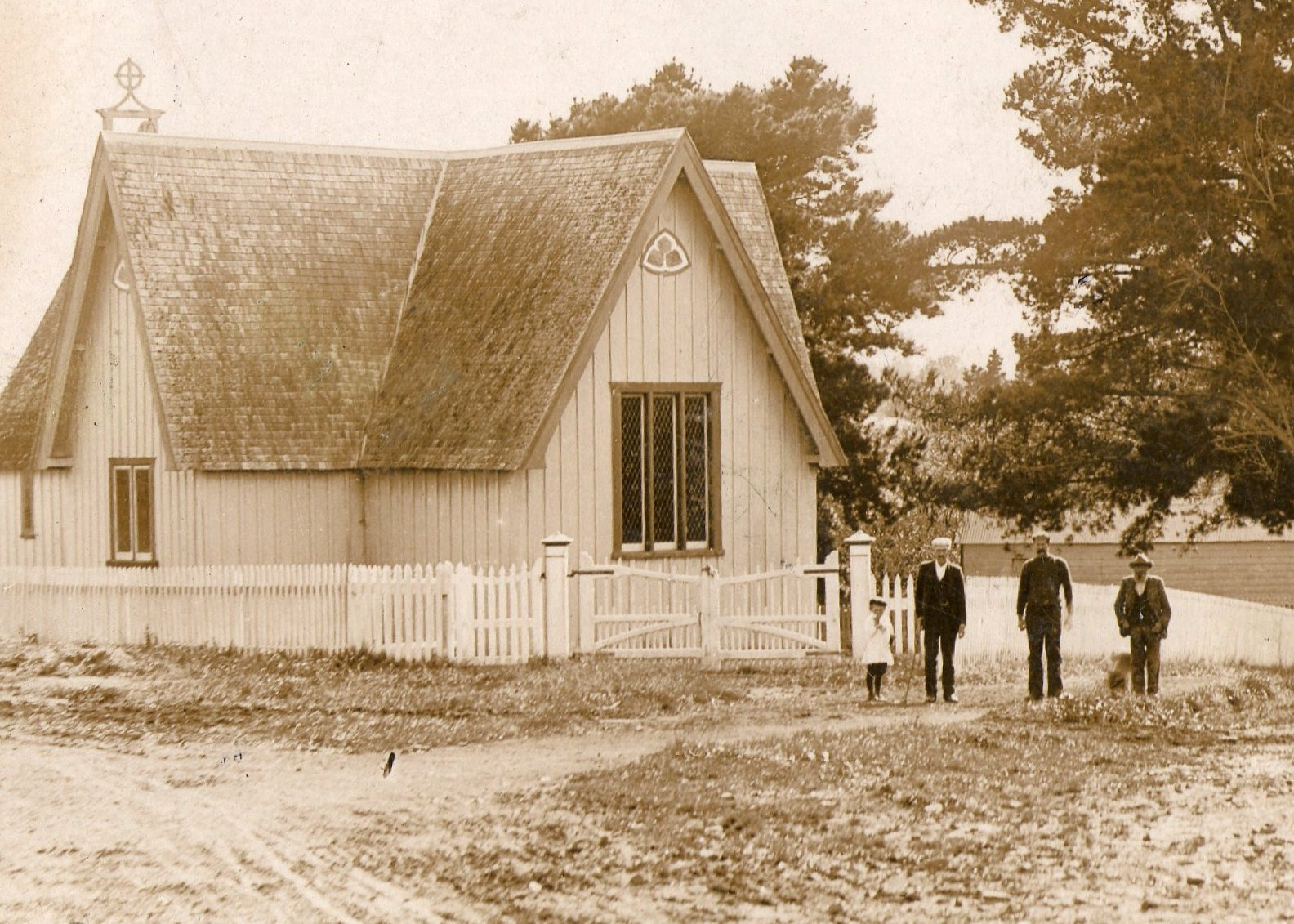
The Selwyn Chapel c. 1908

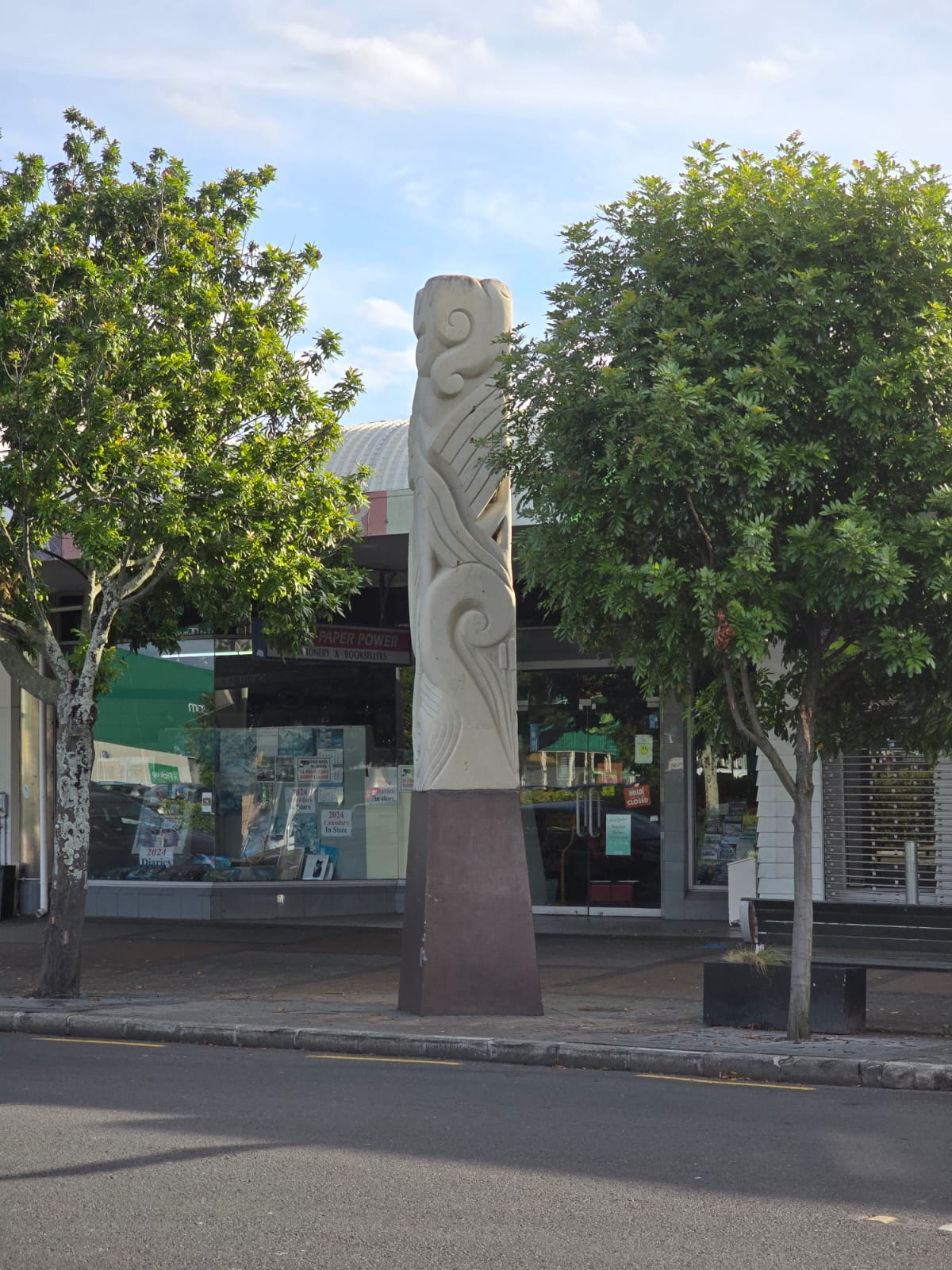
Unity, a 2001 sculpture by John Tohia in Papakura

- Accent Point Building, which houses the Papakura Museum, Sir Edmund Hillary Library and Elim Christian Centre.
- Christ Church (Anglican) established in 1862 with Selwyn Chapel.
- Cumulus Pavilion (2009), a sculpture and outdoor stage by artist Sara Hughes in Central Park, Papakura
- Kirk's Bush, an area of remnant native forest.
- Papakura-Karaka War Memorial, a World War I memorial statue dedicated to fallen soldiers of the Papakura and Karaka areas
- Papakura Military Camp, army base established in 1939
- Prince Edward Park, a sports venue in Papakura
- Unity, a 2001 sculpture in the Papakura town centre, created by John Tohia and Papakura youth

== Notable people ==
- Fleur Adcock – Poet
- John Afoa - Rugby union player, All Black
- Sir Edmund Hillary - Mountaineer and explorer
- Katrina Grant – Southern Steel and Silver Ferns netballer
- Lance Hamilton – International cricketer
- George Hawkins – Politician, Member of Parliament
- Jerome Kaino - Rugby union player, All Black
- Keven Mealamu – Rugby union player, All Black
- Reg Mombassa – Artist and musician
- P-Money – Hip-hop DJ
- Blair Pocock – International cricketer
- Kieran Read – Rugby union player, All Black
- Joe Rokocoko – Rugby union player, All Black
- David Sabine – Cricketer
- Kimberley Smith – Long-distance runner
- Mike Thackwell – Racing driver
- John Walker – Middle-distance runner, Olympic gold medallist

== Bibliography ==
- Bloomfield, G.T. (1973). The Evolution of Local Government Areas in Metropolitan Auckland, 1840–1971. Auckland University Press, Oxford University Press. ISBN 0-19-647714-X.
- Mackintosh, Lucy (2021). Shifting Grounds: Deep Histories of Tāmaki Makaurau Auckland. Bridget Williams Books. doi:10.7810/9781988587332. ISBN 978-1-988587-33-2.
- Smith, Michelle Ann (2016). 'Open All Hours': Main Street Papakura c. 1865–c.1938 (2nd ed.). Papakura: Papakura and Districts Historical Society. ISBN 978-0-473-36174-7.
