= ETNZ =

ETNZ may refer to:

- Emirates Team New Zealand
- Entertainment Technology New Zealand
