= Kelvin Road School =

Location
- Kelvin Road, Auckland, New Zealand; 37.0630°S 174.9590°E

Information
- Type: Primary. (Years 0-6)
- Motto: Be the best you can be
- Established: 1968
- Ministry of Education Institution no.: 1332
- Enrolment: 542 (July 2026)
- Socio-economic decile: 1
- Website: krs.ac.nz

Kelvin Road School is a medium-sized city school. Located in Papakura, a suburb of Auckland, New Zealand, south of the city's CBD (Downtown Auckland City). The school is located on the eastern side of Papakura, close to Ardmore Airport and near Red Hill. The school is a co-educational contributing state primary school, with a staff of twenty three full-time and four part-time teachers. The school is also part of a programme that adds a social worker to its team several days a week in an effort to build stronger communities.

Classrooms are in four blocks with facilities: library, speech clinic, reading and resource rooms, music/av room and swimming pool spread among them. The school has a strong focus on ICT in its curriculum and was the lead school in a Ministry of Education ICT Cluster from 2004 to 2006. The school also has a bilingual and two rumaki reo on site and is home to the Kelvin Road Whanau Centre a branch of the Great Potentials charity that helps support families and provides such as the HIPPY programme as well as kindergarten care.

The school provides optional after school care in the form of a homework centre. sKids (Safe Kids In Daily Supervision) also provide safe after school supervision on the school site. Sports are also well catered for and supported by the staff. In 2007 SPARC (Sport & Recreation New Zealand) visited the school and helped run the schools own World Cup Tournament for Soccer which teams had been involved in over the space of two months. Each classroom represented a different country. Recently the school has been involved in the second Literacy professional development initiative run by the Ministry of Education and has achieved outstanding results. Currently the school is involved in the Papakura Achievement Initiative, which has a strong focus on Literacy.

As part of the schools focus on ICT the school runs its own Radio Station called KRS FM which is broadcast on FM 107.1 throughout the school day.

== Charity Involvement ==
- sKids
- Great Potentials
