= Southern Path =

Shared path in Auckland, New Zealand

Coordinates: 37.058733°S 174.922176°E

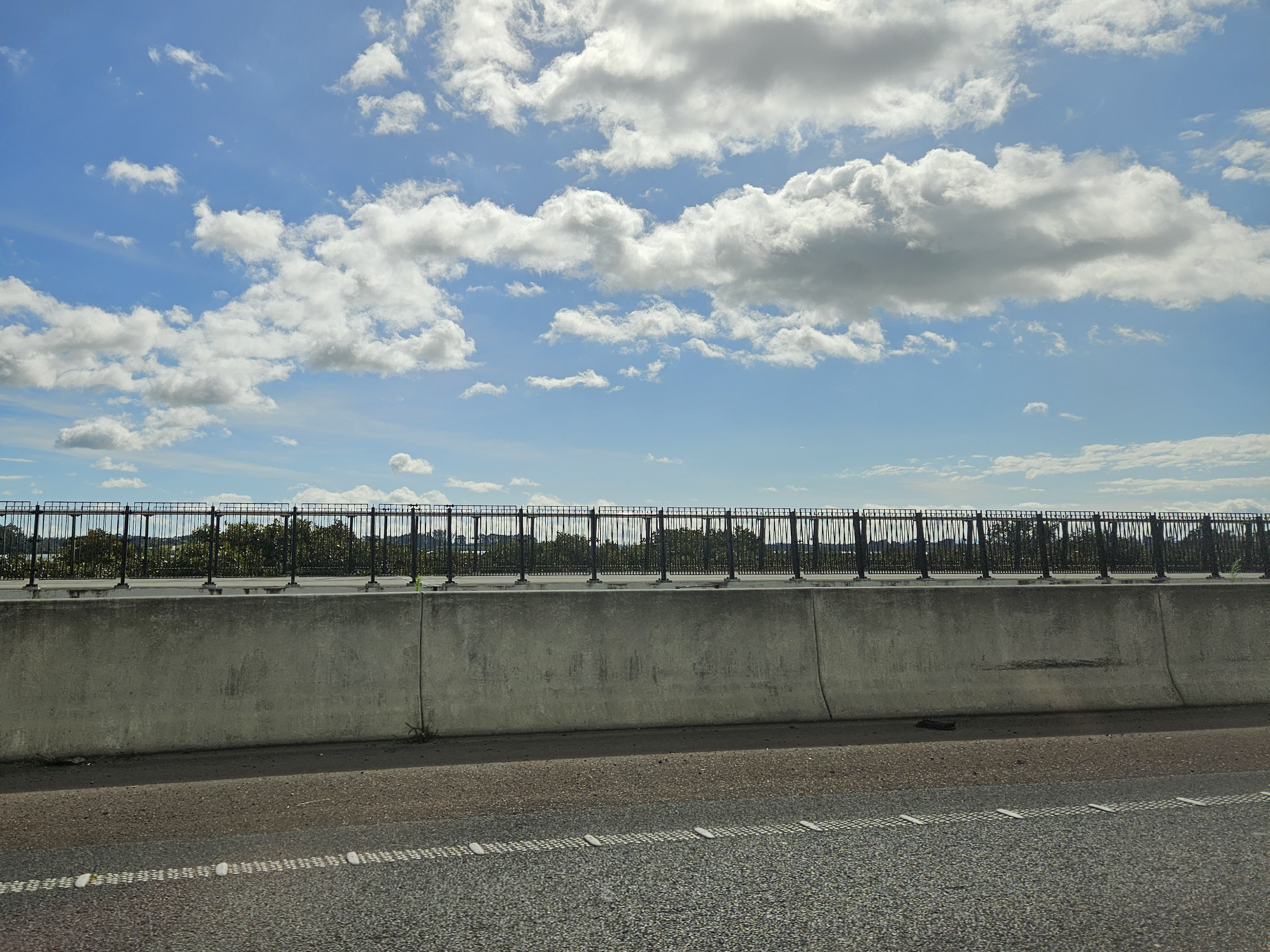
- The Southern Path at Pahurehure Inlet, South Auckland
- Length: 4.5 kilometres (2.8 mi)
- Location: Auckland, New Zealand
- Established: 2021
- Trailheads: Great South Road, Takanini (north) to Hingaia Road, Karaka (south)
- Use: Cycling, pedestrian
- Difficulty: Easy
- Season: All seasons
- Surface: Concrete

Trail map
- Route of the Southern Path

The Southern Path (Māori: Ara Tonga) is a 4.5 km off-road shared path linking Takanini and Papakura. The route runs along State Highway 1. It opened in 2021 and was built part of the Southern Corridor Improvements project.
