= Tuia 250 =

Tuia 250 was a 2019 government-sponsored commemoration for the 250th anniversary of the arrival of Captain Cook on HMS Endeavour in Aotearoa (now New Zealand) in 1769–1770. Highlights of the event were a fleet of Polynesian double-hulled waka and tallships retracing Cook's route and the British High Commissioner delivering an 'expression of regret' to local iwi over the killings of the indigenous Māori people by Cook and his crew.

Some iwi and individuals actively participated in Tuia 250, significant numbers boycotted or otherwise criticised it.

== See also ==
Sesqui 1990
