= Papakura Normal School =

Location
- 143 Porchester Road, Auckland, New Zealand; 37.0486°S 174.9356°E

Information
- Type: Full Primary (Years 0-8)
- Motto: He Waka eke noa (We are all in this together)
- Established: 1953
- Ministry of Education Institution no.: 1423
- Principal: Kev Moorhouse (acting)
- Enrolment: 768 (July 2026)
- Socio-economic decile: 3
- Website: papnormal.school.nz

Papakura Normal School is a coeducational state primary school of Papakura in Auckland, New Zealand.

The school is located approximately 30 kilometres south of the Auckland City Centre, situated on the suburban boundary of Takanini and Papakura.

The school educates children from years 0 to 8 (5-year-old to 13-year-old students).

Papakura Normal School opened in 1953 as Papakura North School situated on the boundary of Papakura Military Camp.

During 1958, the school's name North changed to Normal, The word Normal represents the word normale from the French language which means teaching school. At that time a models block was set up and operated as an independent "school within a school". This was to provide opportunities for trainee teachers to experience teaching in a small rural environment. The models block was closed in 2008 and Papakura Normal School went from a small rural school, to what is now known as a large, popular urban school.

A new classroom block and administration area were built in 2007 next to the Walters Road entrance. An extensive upgrade to the school's buildings began in 2008 with the senior and models blocks being the first to be improved. The Junior block is due for upgrading in 2010.

The school draws from a large range of socio-economic backgrounds, with 54% of the school's pupils being of Māori descent in July 2009.

The school has adult leaders, school leaders, and a head boy and head girl selected from Year 8 students by a vote of students and teachers. Papakura Normal has head students to assist younger students with their learning and well-being.

The school's former Principal, Judy Morgan, retired in May 2017. Derek Linington was appointed tumuaki/principal in May 2017.
