= David Sabine =

New Zealand-born English cricketer

Personal information
- Full name: David John Sabine
- Born: 2 June 1966 (age 60); Papakura, Auckland, New Zealand
- Batting: Right-handed
- Bowling: Right-arm medium

Domestic team information
- Years: Team
- 1988: Kent

Career statistics
Competition	First-class	List A
Matches	1	1
Runs scored	8	–
Batting average	4.00	–
100s/50s	0/0	–
Top score	7	–
Balls bowled	60	30
Wickets	0	0
Bowling average	–	–
5 wickets in innings	–	–
10 wickets in match	–	–
Best bowling	–	–
Catches/stumpings	1/–	0/–
- Source: Cricinfo, 5 February 2012

David John Sabine (born 6 June 1966) is a New Zealand born former English cricketer. Sabine played as a right-handed batsman who bowled right-arm medium pace. He was born at Papakura near Auckland.

Sabine made a single first-class cricket appearance for Kent County Cricket Club against the touring West Indians at the St Lawrence Ground in 1988. In the same season he made a single List A appearance against Sussex at Mote Park in the Refuge Assurance League. These were his only senior appearances for Kent, although he played Second XI cricket for the county between 1984 and 1989.
