= Winter Show Building =

Trade fair building in Wellington, New Zealand

Coordinates: 41°18′29″S 174°46′29″E

- Interactive map of the Winter Show Building area
- Alternative names: Te Whaea

General information
- Type: industrial
- Location: 11 Hutchison Rd, Wellington, New Zealand
- Current tenants: Toi Whakaari: New Zealand Drama School and New Zealand School of Dance
- Year built: 1928
- Owner: Wellington City Council

Design and construction
- Architects: Watson, Gooder and Lee

The Winter Show Building on Hutchison Road, Wellington was built in 1928 by the Wellington Show Association as a permanent home for the Winter Show, an annual trade fair promoting agriculture, trade, and industrial innovations. In 1998 it became the home of Te Whaea, the National Dance & Drama Centre.

== Background ==
Winter shows promoting farming and agriculture were held in Dunedin, Christchurch and other locations during the late nineteenth century, but an attempt in 1899 to hold a winter show in Wellington came to nothing. In April 1923 a meeting of businesspeople discussed the fact that other cities had special events to bring people into town, and the idea of a large show or carnival for Wellington was revisited. It was decided to hold carnival weeks in July and in the summer, with the slogan 'Wellington Welcome Week'. After a carnival in the summer of 1923–24, the Wellington Show Association was established early in 1924. The association held its first winter show in July 1924, opened with speeches by the governor-general and prime minister. The show was held in four Wellington Harbour Board sheds covering 10,000 sq ft (930 m^{2}) of space and featured produce displays, livestock, working exhibits of farm equipment, a motor show of cars, trucks and tractors, and industrial exhibits. The promoters of the 1924 show raised the idea of a purpose-built industrial hall for hosting the show, but for the next three years, Harbour Board buildings were used.

In 1926 architects Watson, Gooder and Lee drew up tentative plans for a permanent winter show building on a large site in Newtown bounded by Hutchinson Road, Hall Street and John Street. The plans included a large exhibition building, sports ground, and a football field with a banked cycle race track around it. Part of the proposed site was on Town Belt land, so the Wellington Show Association applied to Wellington City Council for a lease of 42 years on that land. Wellington Education Board objected to the proposed lease, saying it had had plans in place for three years to use the Town Belt land for a level playground for a new school. Agreement was reached between the Education Board and the Show Association, and after further negotiations with Wellington City Council the project was able to go ahead.

== The Winter Show Building ==
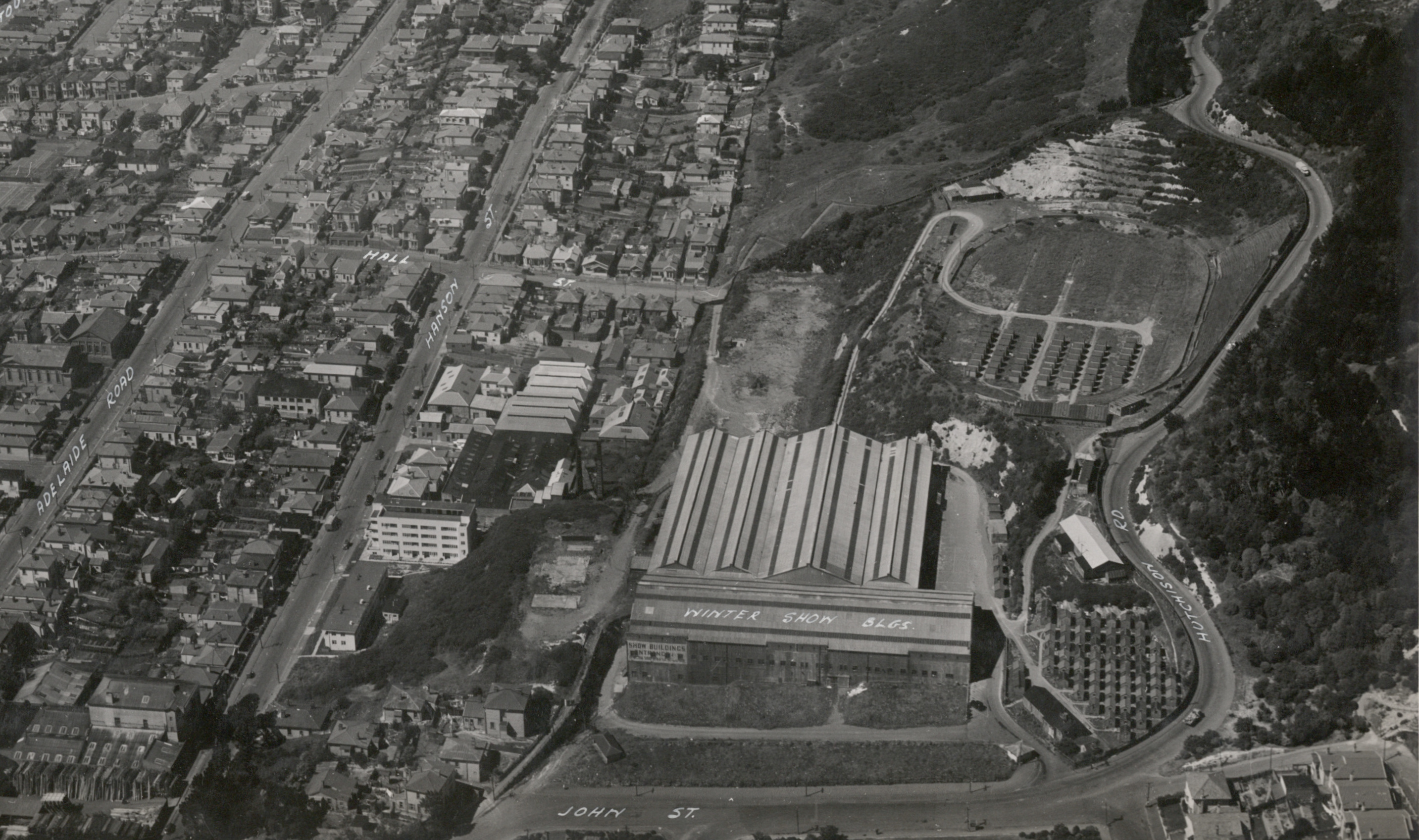
Aerial view of Winter Show Building in 1947.

Part of the site which had been used as a rubbish dump (nicknamed 'Jam Tin Gully') was cleaned up, other areas were levelled, and a road through the site was relocated. Funding for the project came from investment by members of the Wellington Show Association, profits from previous shows, and debentures sold to the public. Future income was expected to come from not just from winter shows, but from sports meetings and other events to be held in the new building and grounds.

The £40,000 contract to construct the new building was granted to August Swanson, and work began early in 1928. The building was constructed from timber, corrugated iron, and asbestos sheets, with concrete arches supporting the roof. Piles for the building had to be driven to an average depth of 40 ft, through years' worth of rubbish dumped in the gully. It had been hoped to open the building in time for the 1928 winter show, but on 29 June 1928 a 20-ton reinforced concrete arch section of the partially-constructed building was knocked over by high winds, causing thousands of pounds' worth of damage.

The Winter Show Building was officially opened on 19 September 1928. The show building was 300 ft by 400 ft and had five acres of floor space. There was one main floor, basically a shell with roofing covering a vast open area, and two big basements to be used as storage for fittings and as a livestock exhibition area. The main floor consisted of five large halls. Each hall's roof was supported by large concrete spans needing no central supports, to allow a large unbroken floor area for exhibitions or sports. There was a mezzanine floor above the halls, intended for a tea room and dancing, with a promenade giving elevated views of the halls. An ornate concrete façade with turrets and a dome had been designed for the building's frontage to John Street, but this was never built.

On 19 June 1956 a fire broke out in the office area of the building, and part of the roof fell in, injuring two firemen.

Apart from its use for the Winter Show, the building was used for many activities over the years including sports training, a miniature rifle club shooting range, a circus, roller skating, and music concerts. During World War 2 the Winter Show Building was used as a base for military training. For many years, the Winter Show also featured an outdoor area with fairground rides and sideshows.

== Sesqui 1990 ==
In February 1990 a trade fair was held to celebrate New Zealand's sesquicentennial, 150 years since the signing of the Treaty of Waitangi and arrival of the first European settlers to Wellington. Sesqui 1990 was a joint venture between the Wellington Show Association and Wellington City Council, and was underwritten by the City Council and Wellington Regional Council. The fair was held in two venues: one was on the waterfront, and the other was at the Winter Show Building. A shuttle bus carried visitors between the two locations. The Winter Show Building was painted bright yellow for the event, with 4000 litres of paint donated by Dulux. The fair was a financial disaster, with many exhibitors pulling out before it opened and visitor numbers way below expectations. Although it was supposed to run for six weeks, Sesqui closed after only two weeks.

== Decline ==
Visitor numbers at the Winter Show began declining in the 1980s. In 1990, the organiser of the Winter Show blamed the drop in visitor numbers on the introduction of Lotto in 1987, which he said had reduced people's disposable income. He also believed that Wellington's failed Sesqui festival earlier that year had turned the public off trade fairs. In 1993 the Wellington Show Association's marketing manager noted that visitor numbers had almost halved since the late 1980s, and said that “a lot of the businesses that used to utilise shows and exhibitions now have their own warehouses. They just do not need this type of thing”. The association was also heavily in debt after the Sesqui festival. The Wellington Show Association held its last Winter Show in 1994, but the site was still used for festivals and funfairs during the next two years. In June 1996 Wellington City Council took over ownership of the building in exchange for the $1.99 million debt owed to it by the Wellington Show Association. The Wellington Show Association was liquidated in 1999.

== Transformation to performing arts centre ==
In 1997 Wellington City Council leased the deteriorating Winter Show Building to the national drama school Toi Whakaari and the New Zealand School of Dance, which had both been looking for new space. The council also guaranteed a loan of $1 million to the dance and drama schools to renovate the building. The two schools came together at the renovated Winter Show Building as a national performing arts centre, named Te Whaea, which opened in 1998. Refurbishment of the building included nine large and four small studios, a 200-seat theatre, a library, and areas for set construction, sound, lighting, and costume.
