= Te Whaea =

New Zealand National Dance and Drama Centre, in Wellington

Coordinates: 41°18′29″S 174°46′29″E

Te Whaea in Newtown, Wellington, New Zealand, is the New Zealand National Dance and Drama Centre, the home to the New Zealand School of Dance and Toi Whakaari: New Zealand Drama School.

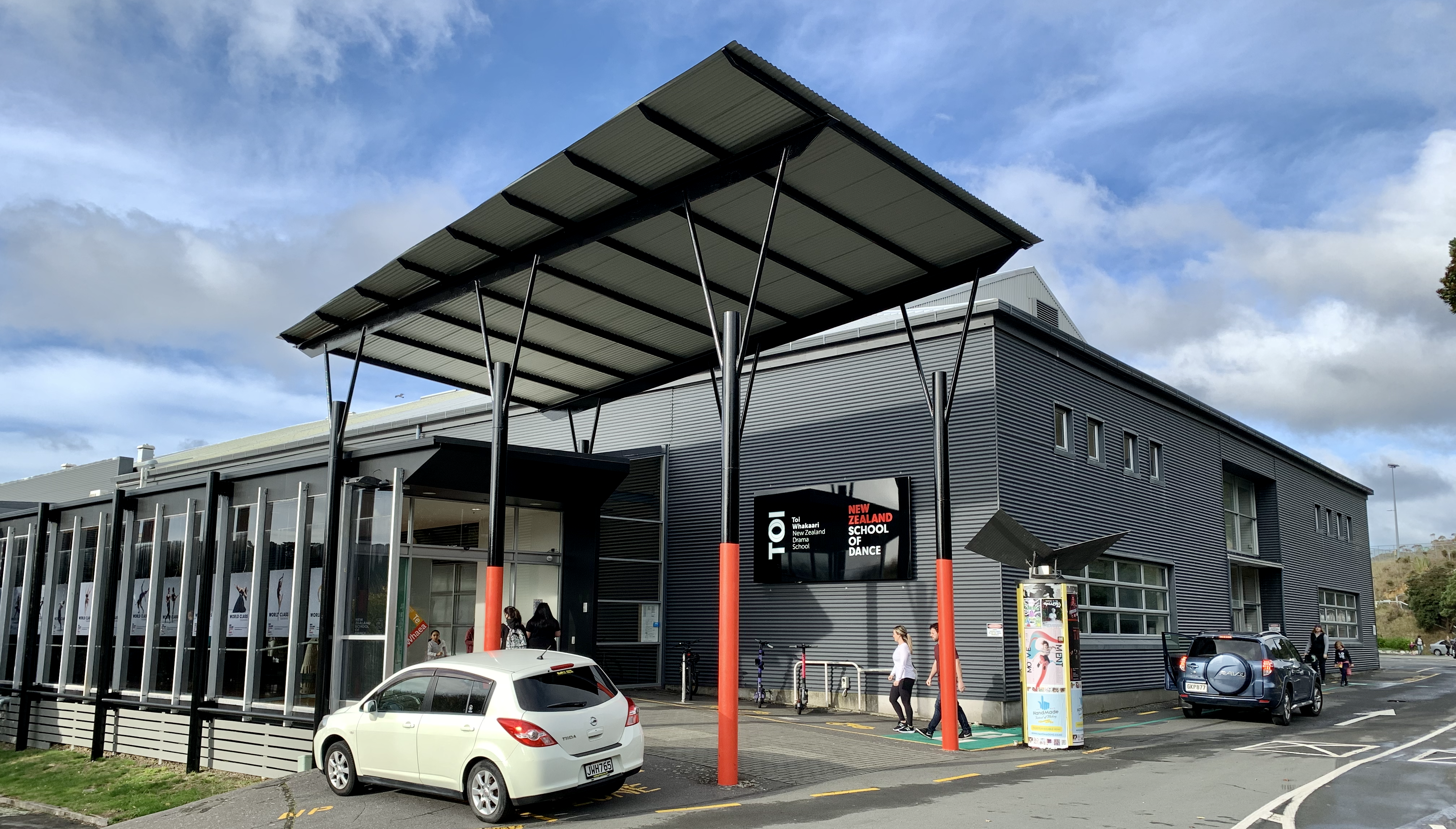
Te Whaea, 11 Hutchison Street, Newtown, 2021

The name 'Te Whaea' means 'the mother' in the Māori language. Te Whaea was opened in 1998 and celebrated its 25th anniversary in 2023.

The building was constructed by the Wellington Show Association in 1928 and was originally known as the Winter Show Building. It was used for the annual Winter Show, fairs and exhibitions. The last Winter Show was in 1993; by 1997 the building was in a state of disrepair. In 1997, Wellington City Council leased the deteriorating building to the national drama school Toi Whakaari and the New Zealand School of Dance, which had both been looking for new space. The council also guaranteed a loan of $1 million to the dance and drama schools to renovate the building.

The two schools came together at the renovated Winter Show Building as a national performing arts centre, named Te Whaea, which opened for classes after a dawn ceremony on 28 April 1998. An official opening ceremony was held on 26 June 1998. Refurbishment of the building included nine large and four small studios, a 200-seat theatre, a library, and areas for set construction, sound, lighting and costume.

Te Whaea is used by many cultural groups in the city. It is the venue for a number of reoccurring events including national dance training for all ages and the ETNZ conference every two years.
