= Sesqui 1990 =

Failed festival in Wellington, New Zealand

Sesqui 1990 was a festival that was staged in February 1990 in the city of Wellington, New Zealand. A spectacular commercial and administrative failure, the Sesqui event has subsequently become an icon of corporate mismanagement within New Zealand popular culture.

== History ==
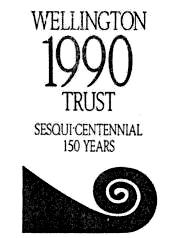
Letterhead of the Wellington 1990 Trust

Billed by promoters as 'New Zealand's biggest event ever', the festival was staged in Wellington to mark the New Zealand sesquicentenary celebrations, the 150th anniversary of the 1840 signing of the Treaty of Waitangi. The event was a joint venture between the Wellington Show Association and the Wellington 1990 Trust, a well-funded regional organisation. The Wellington regional and city councils jointly underwrote this event by NZ$1.4 million. The executive director of the Sesqui carnival was John Gittus, who had previously been director of the successful World Expo held in Brisbane in 1988.

The Sesqui festival was planned to include a wide range of cultural, trade and scientific exhibits as well as entertainment events and funfair amusements. A market research company predicted that 1.7 million people might visit the festival, and that 600,000 visitors would be the break-even point. The festival was scheduled to run for six weeks and anticipated to attract 30,000 visitors per day, despite the fact that the population of the entire Wellington region at that time was fewer than 400,000 people.

There were difficulties attracting performers and sponsors, due to lack of funds and disagreements over arrangements. For example, Nga Paiaka, a Māori group who were to set up a Māori village, withdrew because they were not happy with the fees they were to be charged for an unsatisfactory space in the Winter Show Building, and because they would not receive any income from gate sales. The government refused to support a floating casino, so there was no money for a planned DSIR feature and this had to be cancelled. The New Zealand 1990 Commission declined to support the event.

Several weeks before the festival was due to begin, the media reported that the Sesqui organisers had decided to stage their opening celebration simultaneously with the opening celebrations of the 1990 New Zealand International Festival of the Arts. Neither the Sesqui organisers nor the Arts Festival organisers were prepared to alter their plans. The scheduled dates for Sesqui did not match the school holidays or Easter break.

== The event ==
NZ$150,000 worth of fireworks launched Sesqui 1990 on 23 February 1990, with the festival opening the following day.

The festival organisers had made a decision to split the event between two venues, one at the Wellington Waterfront and the other at the (then) Wellington Show and Sports Centre (Winter Show Building) in Newtown. Despite the arrangement of a shuttle bus service between these two venues, this decision had the effect of confusing and frustrating potential visitors to the festival, with the result that neither venue attracted visitor numbers beyond an average of 2,500 per day.

The organisers had also adopted a policy against advertising the daily schedules for musical and other performances taking place at either venue. This policy was based on the assumption that it would encourage visitors to prolong their stay and to make numerous return visits so as not to miss seeing favourite performers. As a result, a number of popular musicians, singers and other entertainers played to largely empty houses because the public did not know when or where they were performing.

Within days of the opening of the festival, media reports began to suggest that it was faltering. During a heated radio interview, Wellington City Councillor Ruth Gotlieb maintained that it was "every Wellingtonian's civic duty to attend Sesqui."

Pre-ticket sales had reached only 2.4% of targets, and after opening, the $12 entry fee to the festival soon dropped to $6 in a desperate bid to attract visitors. The highest attendance figure was achieved during the final days of the event, when 32,000 visitors took advantage of a decision to waive all entry fees, which were widely regarded as being excessive.

Although planned to run for six weeks, Sesqui 1990 closed after only 12 days, on 7 March 1990, with debts in excess of NZ$6.4 million.

== Aftermath ==
The collapse of the Sesqui 1990 festival forced a number of small companies that had been contracted to supply various goods and services to the event into receivership and/or bankruptcy. The Wellington Show Association was liquidated in 1999.

Two iconic billboards promoting Sesqui 1990 remained standing for a number of months after the event's premature closure, apparently because the organisers could not afford to have them removed. One of these, featuring an image of gleeful Sesqui visitors, was quickly defaced with graffiti reading "And I laughed and laughed and laughed". The other billboard, a plywood cut-out representing Sesqui mascot "Pesky Sesky" – a sort of anthropomorphic opossum, or possibly sasquatch – had been erected on a rooftop to welcome visitors to the Show and Sports Centre venue, and eventually disappeared during a wind storm.

Other sesquicentenary events fared better, including the New Zealand Sports Hall of Fame, which went on to have a life of its own.

== See also ==
- Tuia 250
