= Entertainment Technology New Zealand =

Association for entertainment technology

- Nickname: ETNZ
- Predecessor: NZATT
- Formation: 2002
- Purpose: Network of professionals in the entertainment and events industry
- Location: New Zealand
- President: Vick Cooksley
- Website: etnz.org

Entertainment Technology New Zealand (ETNZ) formed in 2002 is a professional association for the design, management, craft and technical performing arts and events community in New Zealand.

== Background ==
After establishment in 2002 the first national conference was held at the Auckland Town Hall in 2003. ETNZ is an advocacy body that contributes to training, health and safety guidelines and networking in the performing arts and events industry in New Zealand. Members hold a range of technical, design, craft and management roles.

ETNZ has at 2020 over 450 members across a range of membership options. ETNZ also maintains communication and associations other industry organisations such as Musical Theatre New Zealand (MTNZ), the umbrella group for musical societies, and the Entertainment Venues Association Of New Zealand (EVANZ) who are an advocacy and development incorporated society with members from sports and performing arts venues and community centres.

The current executive includes Vicky Cooksley, President, Phil Sargeant, Vice President, Kellie Dunlop, Secretary and Treasurer and Kathryn Osborne, Memberships.

Recognition in the industry of members is acknowledged through the ETNZ life membership. Recipients of this are Walter Coleman (died 2015), Stephen Fairweather, Tricia & Stewart Macpherson, Graeme Philip, Jeremy Collins (died 2018), Hugh Kenderdine, Bong Wong, Chris McKenzie, Wilf Conroy (died 2018), John McKay and Rob Peters.

== Activities ==
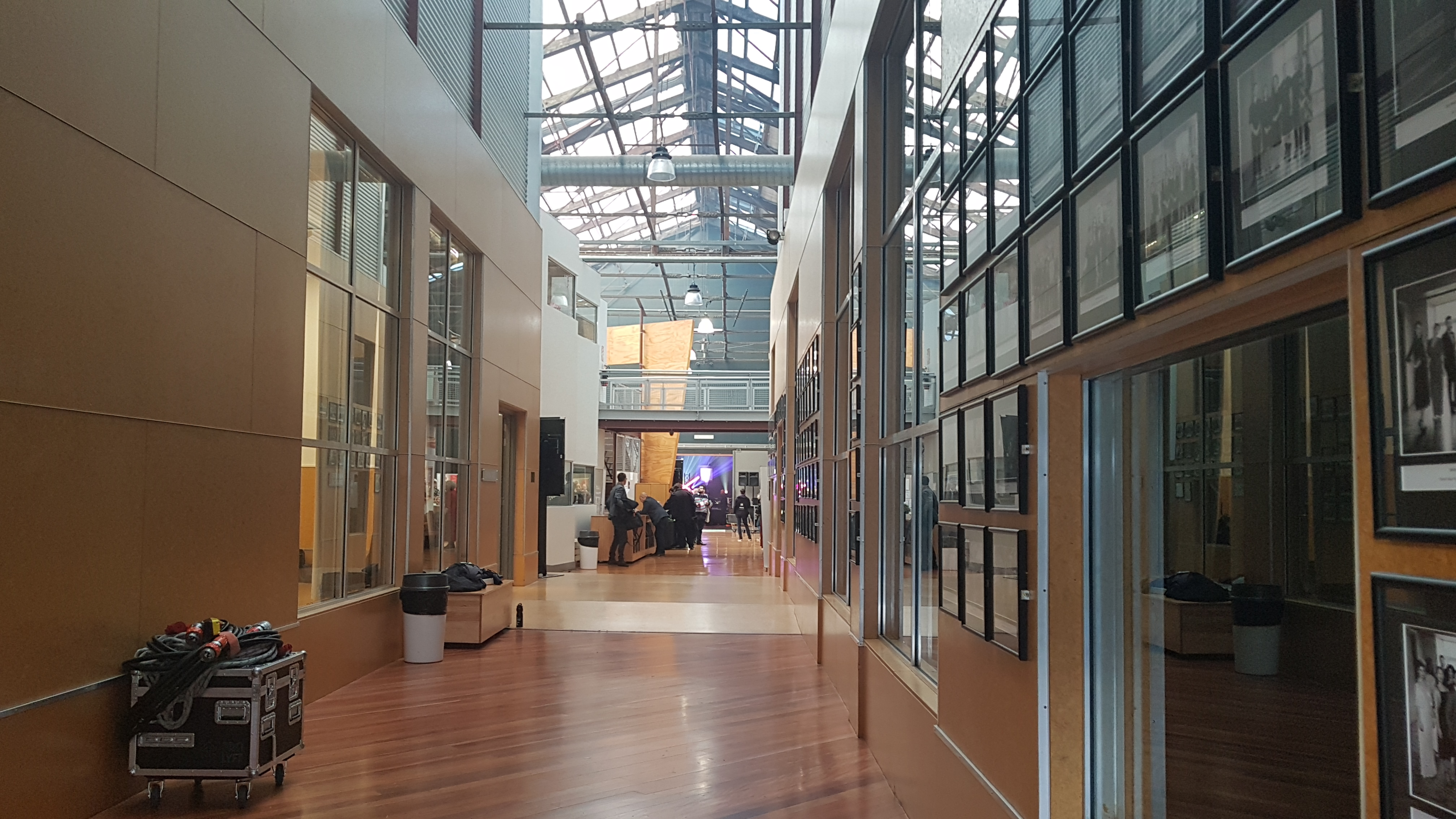
View at Te Whaea down 'Drama Street' to the conference 2019

ETNZ organise a national conference and tradeshow every two years. The past few have been held at Te Whaea, home of Toi Whakaari and the New Zealand School of Dance. In 2021 exhibitors were to include companies Aspiring Safety, Fiasco Ltd, Jands NZ, John Herber Ltd, Kenderdine Entertainment Lighting, LS Group, Metro Productions, Scenic Solutions, ShowQuip, Show Technology, Stage Mark Ltd, Theatrelight, & ULA Group.

Gathering and disseminating safety information for the industry has been supported by the development of a two written resources: Guide for Safe Working Practices in the New Zealand Theatre & Entertainment Industry (Version 14 April 2018) and Safe Rigging Practices for the Entertainment Industry in New Zealand (2015).

Being an advocate for education and training of technicians is part of the ETNZ activity. ETNZ has been closely involved in the developed unit standards to meet these recent Skills Active Aotearoa qualifications for the industry through the New Zealand Qualification Framework.

In 2020, ETNZ was part of organising the global #WeMakeEvents campaign to raise awareness of a 'hidden industry' at risk because of global pandemic COVID19 closures of events.
