= Papakura City =

Former city in Auckland, New Zealand

Coordinates: 37°04′04″S 174°56′37″E

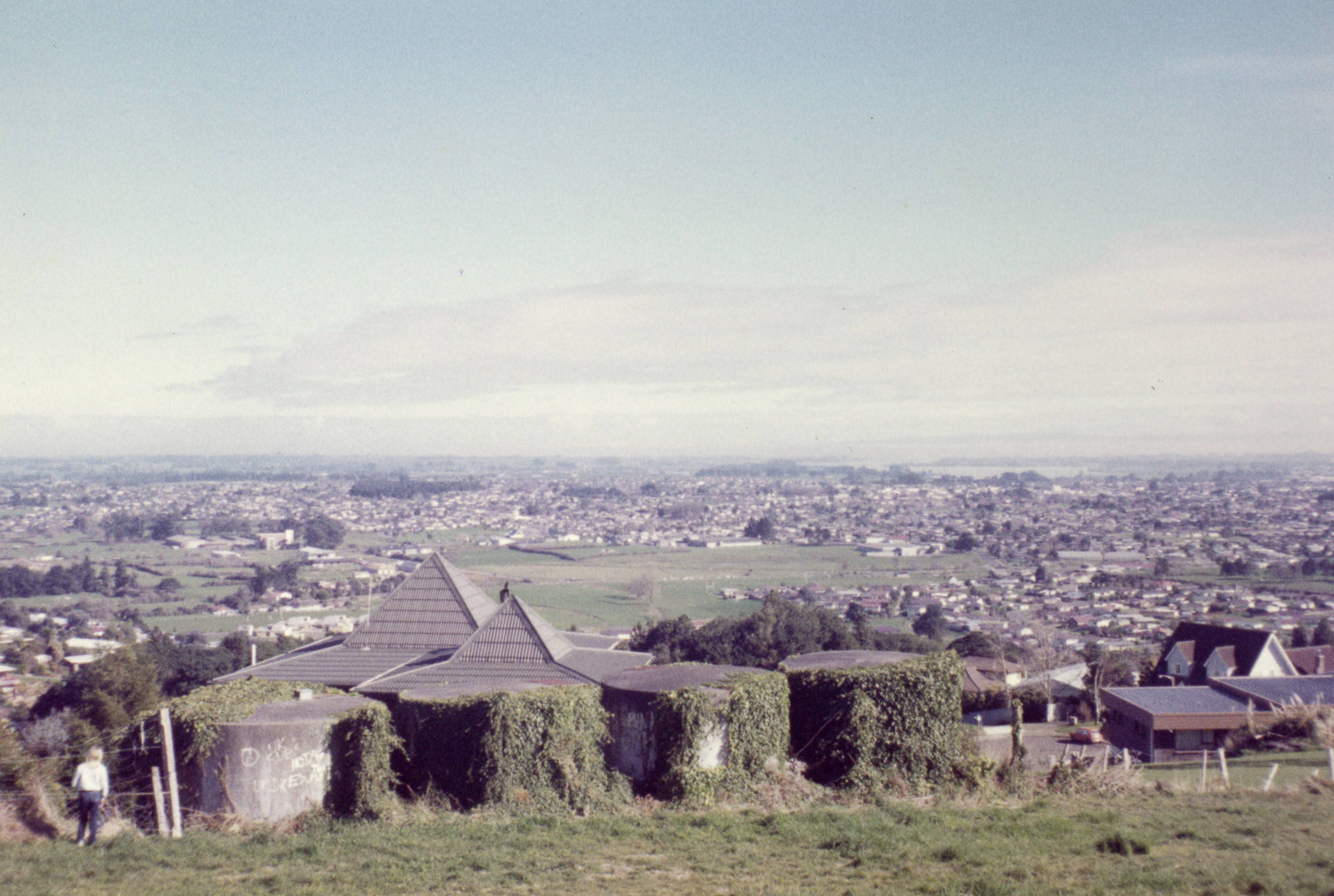
View of Papakura City in 1984

Papakura City was a city near Auckland, New Zealand. It existed from 1975 to 1989.

== History ==
Papakura City was constituted as a city on 1 January 1975. It existed until the 1989 local government reforms, when "Papakura City" was subsumed by "Papakura District". In the 1989 reform, Drury and Karaka were added to Papakura from the Franklin area, and Ardmore, Alfriston and Takanini (including Conifer Grove) were added from Manukau City.
