= New Zealand 1990 Commission =

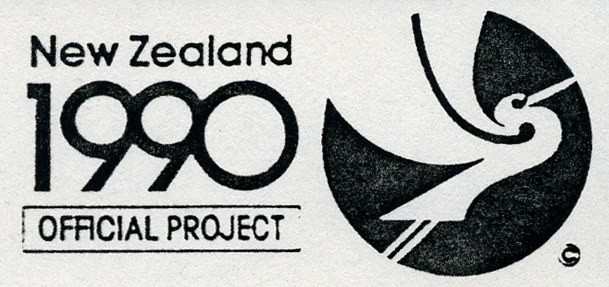
New Zealand 1990 logo, featuring a kōtuku (white heron)

The New Zealand 1990 Commission was established on 3 December 1988 to initiate activities and events for celebrating the 150th anniversary of New Zealand as a nation, the signing of the Treaty of Waitangi, 1000 years of known human habitation of New Zealand, and the 75th anniversary of the landing at Gallipoli.

== Background ==
The Commission was initially made up of 12 persons and the Minister of Internal Affairs, with the Minister as chairperson. Michael Bassett (the minister) appointed Don Hutchings to the position of CEO of the commission. Four regional offices were established in Auckland, Christchurch, Wellington and Dunedin. In order to fulfil its statutory functions the Commission had two major roles, that of an advisory body, and the body responsible for the distribution of funds for 1990 celebrations. There was an initiative to diversify New Zealand's imagery such as using the kōtuku (white heron) instead of the kiwi or silver fern as its logo.

Committees were formed throughout New Zealand based on the then existing local boundary authorities. Community groups, organisations and individuals wishing to organise 1990 events worked with these committees who in turn liaised with the nearest 1990 regional office.

== Aims ==
The New Zealand 1990 Commission encouraged participation and involvement of many New Zealanders in the 1990 celebrations. In doing so the Commission hoped to:

- increase the understanding and awareness of the Treaty of Waitangi
- increase awareness and understanding of alternative points of view and differing cultural backgrounds
- encourage planning and thinking for the next 50 years to lay a better foundation for the future

The Wellington office also had responsibility for advertising and communications for the New Zealand 1990 Commission. This included the coverage of events such as Queen Elizabeth II attending the 1990 celebrations at Waitangi, and television campaigns covering other celebratory events. The events began on New Year's Day 1990 with televised coverage of a dawn ceremony of a waka welcomed into Gisborne accompanied by song from Kiri te Kanawa. In February the successful launch was followed by the disastrous Sesqui 1990 fair in Wellington that shut down after just two weeks due to a lack of attendance with debts exceeding NZ$6.4 million.

== Legacy ==
The impact of the 1990 celebrations mostly were not lasting. However the first volume of the Dictionary of New Zealand Biography was launched (despite not initially being planned as a 1990 commemoration project) and an oral history project was started after a financial contribution from the Australian government. The New Zealand Sports Hall of Fame proved so popular however that it was made permanent. Initially based in Wellington it has been in Dunedin since 1999 and still uses the 1990 Commission logo in its branding.

== Commission members ==
The members of the New Zealand 1990 Commission were:

- Michael Bassett (chair)
- Ron Scott (deputy chair)
- Peter Boag
- Louisa Crawley
- Sharon Crosbie
- Bruce Gregory
- Samantha Johnson
- Maurits Kelderman
- Jim McLay
- June Mariu
- Keith Sinclair
- Bill Steele
- Rangi Te Maiharoa

== See also ==
- Sesqui 1990
- 1990 Commonwealth Games
