= Pukekiwiriki =

Volcano in Auckland, New Zealand

- Red Hill

Highest point
- Elevation: 210 m (690 ft)
- Coordinates: 37.064002°S 175.000366°E

Geography
- Location: Auckland, North Island, New Zealand
- Parent range: South Auckland volcanic field

Geology
- Volcanic field: South Auckland volcanic field

The Pukekiwiriki (alternatively spelled and pronounced Pukekoiwiriki), also known as Red Hill, is the northernmost volcano of the South Auckland volcanic field in New Zealand, located east of Papakura, which erupted an estimated one million years ago. The hill was the site of a major Tāmaki Māori pā, and the Te Ākitai Waiohua village Te Aparangi in the 19th century.

== Etymology ==
The name in Māori literally means "the Hill of the Little Kiwi", but is also known by the name Pukekōiwiriki. This name, directly translated as "hill" (puke-) "bones" (koiwi-) "of the Riki people" (riki) or sometimes as "the Hill of the Small Skeleton", refers to the remains of ancient chiefs found at this hill, and the red soil, stained by their deaths. The English language name, Red Hill, refers to the red volcanic soils on the volcano's slopes.

== Geology and biodiversity ==
Pukekiwiriki is a basalt volcano that erupted an estimated 1,000,000 years ago. The eruption flowed west towards Papakura, and scoria thrown out from the eruption dammed the Hunua Gorge for a period.

Some areas of Pukekiwiriki have remnant native forest, dominated by taraire, pūriri and kohekohe trees.

== History ==
The hill has a flat summit, which became the location of a pā, known variously as Paritaiuru, Pukekōiwiriki or Pukekiwiriki. The pā is associated with the Tainui ancestress Mārama, who was the second wife of Hoturoa, captain of the Tainui waka. She settled permanently at the pā after quarrelling with Hoturoa. The site became a home for the Tāmaki Māori people who descended from her, known as Ngā Marama, who later became a part of the Waiohua. The pā was strategically important, due to the view of the Manukau Harbour and the Hunua Ranges from this point, and was linked to settlements in the Hunua Ranges and Bombay Hills by paths.

By the early 19th century, the residents of the area moved from the pā in favour of a kāinga (village) on the slopes of Pukekiwiriki, known as called Te Aparangi. By this time, Te Aparangi became the major settlement for Te Ākitai Waiohua. Te Aparangi was surrounded by extensive farms and orchards, where crops including kūmara, taro and wheat were grown for the growing town of Auckland. Te Ākitai Waiohua fled the village in July 1863, during the Invasion of the Waikato.
