= Sesquialtera =

Sesquialtera ('one and a half') may refer to:

- Sesquialterum in mathematics, the ratio 3:2, a superparticular ratio
- Sesquialtera or the equivalent Greek term hemiola, three in the time of two as variously used in music theory:
  - Sesquialtera commonly describes a tempo proportion in mensural notation
  - Hemiola is more common for the temporary substitution of a 2+2+2 musical meter for 3+3
- Sesquialtera (organ stop), combining mutation ranks at 2 2/3' and 1 3/5', i.e. both 3:2 and 5:4 pitch ratios
- Sesquialtera (moth), a genus of moth in the family Geometridae
