= List of schools in the Auckland Region =

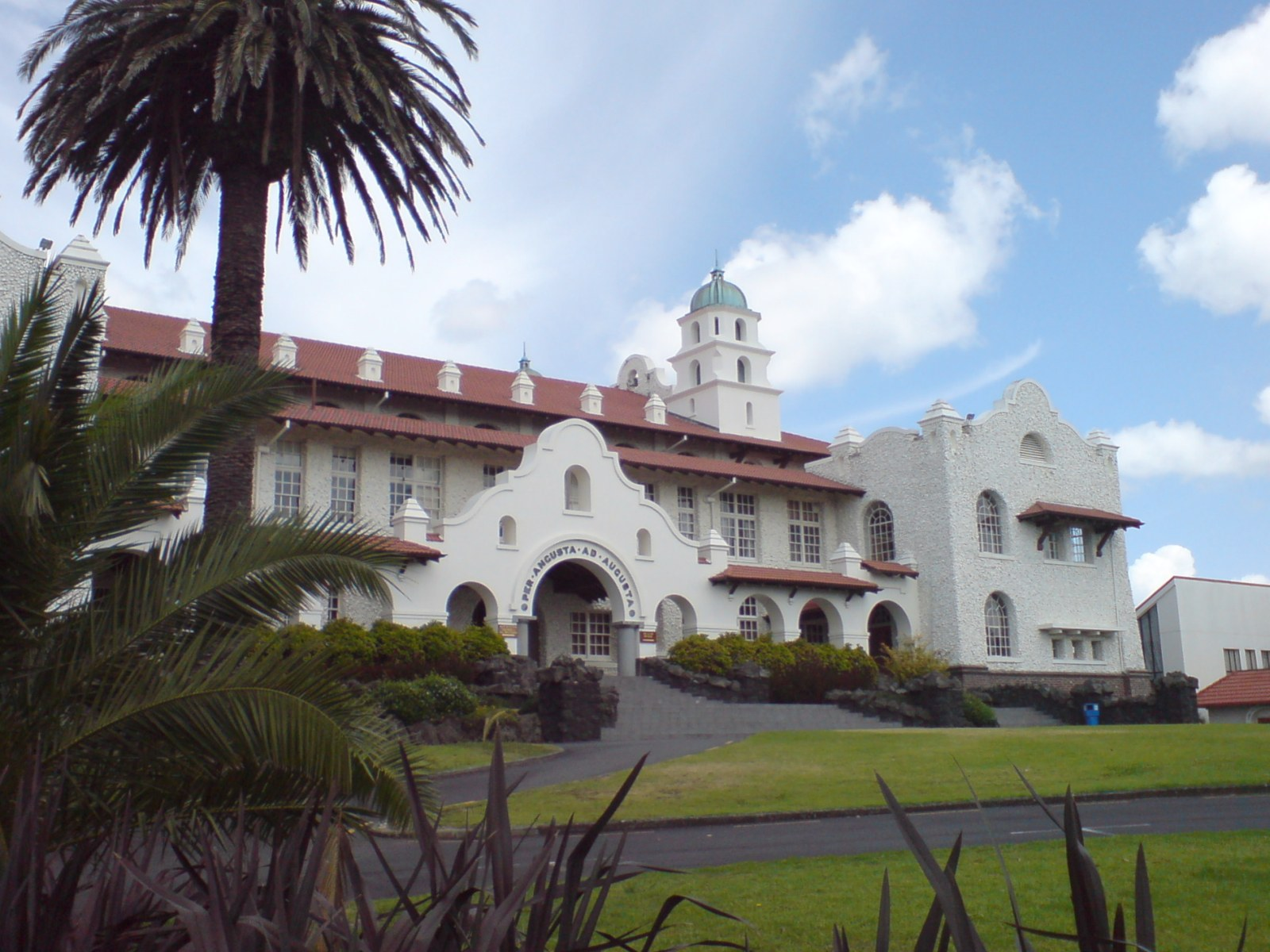
Auckland Grammar School

The Auckland region is the most populous region of New Zealand, containing the country's most populous city, Auckland, as well the towns of Wellsford, Warkworth, Helensville, the Hibiscus Coast, Pukekohe and Waiuku and their surrounding rural areas, plus many islands in the Hauraki Gulf including Waiheke Island and Great Barrier Island. It contains a few small rural primary schools, some small town primary and secondary schools, and a large number of city schools. As of June 2011, there are 538 primary and secondary schools in Auckland, enrolling over 267,000 students.

In New Zealand schools, students begin formal education in Year 1 at the age of five. Year 13 is the traditional final year of secondary education, although students are entitled to stay in secondary school until the end of the calendar year of their 19th birthday if need be. The list of schools below is broken up into primary and intermediate schools, which includes contributing primary schools (Years 1–6), full primary schools (Years 1–8), and intermediate schools (Years 7 and 8); secondary schools, which includes normal secondary schools (Years 9-13), secondary schools with intermediate (Years 7–13), junior secondary schools (Years 7–10) and senior secondary schools (Years 11–13); composite schools (Years 1–13); and special schools and teen parent units. Primary and intermediate schools are further broken up into the local board of the Auckland Council in which each school is located.

State schools are those fully funded by the government and at which no fees for tuition of domestic students (i.e. New Zealand citizens and permanent residents, and Australian citizens) can be charged, although a donation is commonly requested. A state integrated school is a former private school with a special character based on a religious or philosophical belief that has been integrated into the state system. State integrated schools charge "attendance dues" to cover the building and maintenance of school buildings, which are not owned by the government, but otherwise they like state schools cannot charge fees for tuition of domestic students but may request a donation. Private schools charge fees to its students for tuition, as do state and state integrated schools for tuition of international students.

The roll of each school changes frequently as students start school for the first time, move between schools, and graduate. The rolls given here are those provided by the Ministry of Education, and are based on figures from July 2026. The equity index (EQI) is a measure of the average socioeconomic status of the school's roll: the higher the number, the more socioeconomic barriers students face to achievement. For statistical purposes, schools are banded into seven bands based on their EQI and the barriers faced: fewest, few, below average, average, above average, many, and most. The EQI and band given here are based on figures from 2026. The Ministry of Education institution number links to the Education Counts page for each school.

== Primary and intermediate schools ==
Unless otherwise stated, all primary and intermediate schools in the Auckland region are coeducational.

=== Rodney ===
Name	MOE	Years	Area	Authority	Opened	Roll	Website	Notes
Ahuroa School	1200	1–8	Ahuroa	State	1888	51		
Ahutoetoe School	764	1–6	Milldale	State	2023	277	[492]	
Coatesville School	1252	1–6	Coatesville	State	1916	252		
Dairy Flat School	1258	1–8	Dairy Flat	State		271		
Hare Krishna School	4204	1–8	Kumeū	State integrated		214		
Helensville Primary School	1306	1–8	Helensville	State		493		
Huapai District School	1320	1–8	Huapai	State	1919	499		
Horizon School	1156	1–8	Snells Beach	State integrated	1991	206		
Kaipara Flats School	1324	1–6	Kaipara Flats	State		109		
Kaukapakapa School	1326	1–8	Kaukapakapa	State		250		
Leigh School	1340	1–6	Leigh	State		56		
Matakana School	1364	1–6	Matakana	State		350		
Matua Ngaru School	774	1–8	Kumeū	State	2019	552		
Pakiri School	1074	1–8	Pākiri	State		8		
Parakai School	1432	1–8	Parakai	State		216		
Riverhead School	1464	1–8	Riverhead	State	1872	469		
Snells Beach Primary	6759	1–6	Snells Beach	State	2009	348		
Tapora School	1106	1–8	Tapora	State		21		
Tauhoa School	1107	1–8	Tauhoa	State	1879	61		
Taupaki School	1529	1–8	Taupaki	State	1899	238		
Tomarata School	1115	1–8	Tomarata	State		96		
Waimauku School	1550	1–8	Waimauku	State		669		
Wainui School	1552	1–8	Wainui	State	1879	256		
Waioneke School	1553	1–8	Waioneke	State	1930	93		
Waitoki School	1558	1–8	Waitoki	State	1924	108		
Warkworth Primary School	1561	1–6	Warkworth	State		626		
Wellsford School	1126	1–8	Wellsford	State		306		
Woodhill School	1577	1–8	Woodhill	State	1877	80		

=== Hibiscus and Bays ===
Name	MOE	Years	Area	Authority	Opened	Roll	Website	Notes
Browns Bay School	1237	1–6	Browns Bay	State	1888	616		
Glamorgan School	1283	1–6	Torbay Heights	State	1972	493		
Gulf Harbour School	6920	1–8	Gulf Harbour	State		540		
Long Bay School	1342	1–6	Long Bay	State	1979	511		
Mairangi Bay School	1343	1–6	Mairangi Bay	State	1967	446		
Murrays Bay Intermediate	1386	7–8	Murrays Bay	State	1958	1,094		
Murrays Bay School	1387	1–6	Murrays Bay	State		718		
Northcross Intermediate	1396	7–8	Northcross	State		1,510		
Orewa North Primary School	1406	1–6	Orewa	State		398		
Orewa Primary School	1407	1–6	Orewa	State		379		
Red Beach School	1194	1–6	Red Beach	State		466		
Sherwood School	1481	1–6	Northcross	State	1976	480		
Silverdale School	1482	1–6	Silverdale	State		629		
St John's School	1492	1–6	Mairangi Bay	State integrated	1961	303		Catholic
Stanmore Bay School	1513	1–6	Stanmore Bay	State		487		
Stella Maris Primary School	1663	1–8	Silverdale	State integrated	2005	384		Catholic
Torbay School	1538	1–6	Torbay	State	1956	575		
Wentworth Primary	605	1–6	Gulf Harbour	Private	2008	155		
Whangaparaoa School	1571	1–6	Manly	State		809		

=== Upper Harbour ===
Name	MOE	Years	Area	Authority	Opened	Roll	Website	Notes
Albany School	1202	1–6	Albany	State	1866	642		
Greenhithe School	1299	1–6	Greenhithe	State		462		
Hobsonville School	1314	1–8	Hobsonville	State		482		
Hobsonville Point Primary School	6788	1–8	Hobsonville	State	2013	689		
Marina View School	1592	1–8	West Harbour	State		579		
Oteha Valley School	6946	1–6	Oteha	State	2004	510		
Pinehill School	6932	1–6	Pinehill	State		388		
Ridgeview School	1433	1–6	Paremoremo	State		50		
Scott Point Primary School	725	1–8	Hobsonville	State	2021	895		
Timatanga Community School	4146	1–8	Whenuapai	State integrated		24	-	
Upper Harbour Primary School	6955	1–6	Wainoni	State	2006	360		
Westminster Christian School	344	1–8	Unsworth Heights	State integrated		364		
Whenuapai School	1572	1–8	Whenuapai	State	1957	682		

=== Kaipātiki ===
Name	MOE	Years	Area	Authority	Opened	Roll	Website	Notes
Bayview School	1222	1–6	Bayview	State		385		
Beach Haven School	1223	1–6	Beach Haven	State		420		
Birkdale Intermediate	1228	7–8	Birkdale	State		233		
Birkdale North School	1229	1–6	Birkdale	State		142		
Birkdale Primary School	1230	1–6	Birkdale	State	1894	195		
Birkenhead School	1231	1–6	Birkenhead	State		457		
Chelsea School	1244	1–6	Chatswood	State		384		
Glenfield Intermediate	1295	7–8	Glenfield	State	1972	443		
Glenfield Primary School	1296	1–6	Glenfield	State		295		
Kauri Park School	1327	1–6	Beach Haven	State		357		
Manuka Primary School	1350	1–6	Witheford Heights	State		235		
Marlborough School	1361	1–6	Glenfield	State		412		
Northcote Intermediate	1394	7–8	Northcote	State		672		
Northcote School	1395	1–6	Northcote	State	1918	406		
Onepoto School	1400	1–6	Northcote	State		151		
St Mary's School	1505	1–8	Northcote	State integrated		327		Catholic
Sunnybrae Normal School	1516	1–6	Hillcrest	State	1966	377		
Target Road School	1528	1–6	Totara Vale	State	1968	451		
Verran Primary School	1543	1–6	Birkenhead	State		214		
Willow Park School	1573	1–6	Hillcrest	State		633		
Windy Ridge School	1575	1–6	Windy Ridge	State		198		

=== Devonport–Takapuna ===
Name	MOE	Years	Area	Authority	Opened	Roll	Website	Notes
Bayswater School	1221	1–6	Bayswater	State		116		
Belmont Intermediate School	1225	7–8	Belmont	State		616		
Belmont School	1226	1–6	Belmont	State	1912	422		
Campbells Bay School	1242	1–6	Castor Bay	State	1925	802		
Devonport School	1260	1–6	Devonport	State	1870	234		
Forrest Hill School	1278	1–6	Forrest Hill	State		473		
Hauraki Primary School	1304	1–6	Hauraki	State	1954	505		
Milford School	1375	1–6	Milford	State	1926	563		
St Joseph's Catholic School	1498	1–6	Takapuna	State integrated	1849	418		Catholic
St Leo's School	1500	1–6	Devonport	State integrated	1893	55		Catholic
Stanley Bay School	1512	1–6	Stanley Bay	State	1909	167		
Sunnynook Primary School	1518	1–6	Sunnynook	State	1968	503		
Takapuna Normal Intermediate	1524	7–8	Takapuna	State		721		
Takapuna School	1525	1–6	Takapuna	State	1879	366		
Vauxhall School	1541	1–6	Vauxhall	State		157		
Wairau Intermediate	1555	7–8	Sunnynook	State	1980	340		

=== Henderson–Massey ===
Name	MOE	Years	Area	Authority	Opened	Roll	Website	Notes
Birdwood School	1227	1–8	Rānui	State		287		
Bruce McLaren Intermediate	1238	7–8	McLaren Park	State		283		
Colwill School	1254	1–8	Royal Heights	State	1979	247		
Don Buck School	1262	1–8	Massey West	State		253		
Edmonton School	1266	1–6	Te Atatū South	State		207		
Flanshaw Road School	1276	1–6	Te Atatū South	State		362		
Freyberg Community School	1280	1–6	Te Atatū South	State		402		
Glendene School	1293	1–6	Glendene	State		120		
Henderson Intermediate	1307	7–8	Henderson North	State		740		
Henderson North School	1308	1–6	Henderson North	State		356		
Henderson School	1309	1–6	Henderson	State	1874	196		
Henderson South School	1310	1–6	Henderson	State	1967	274		
Holy Cross Catholic School	1316	1–8	Henderson	State integrated		439		Catholic
Lincoln Heights School	1341	1–8	Massey West	State		559		
Massey Primary School	1363	1–8	Massey West	State		533		
Matipo Road School	1365	1–6	Te Atatū Peninsula	State		438		
Peninsula Primary School	1531	1–6	Te Atatū Peninsula	State		434		
Pomaria Primary School	1444	1–6	Lincoln	State		435		
Rangeview Intermediate	1457	7–8	Te Atatū South	State	1968	457		
Rānui School	1458	1–6	Rānui	State		409		
Royal Road School	1476	1–8	Massey North	State		337		
Rutherford School	1478	1–6	Te Atatū Peninsula	State		298		
St Paul's School	1643	1–6	Massey North	State integrated		447		Catholic
Summerland Primary	6937	1–6	Western Heights	State	2002	619		
Sunnyvale School	1519	1–6	Sunnyvale	State		494		
Te Atatū Intermediate	1530	7–8	Te Atatū Peninsula	State	1947	418		
Tirimoana School	1536	1–6	Te Atatū South	State		646		
Te Kura Kaupapa Māori o Te Kotuku	3104	1–8	Rānui	State		139	-	
Waitakere Seventh-day Adventist School	4151	1–8	McLaren Park	State integrated		69		
West Harbour School	1566	1–8	West Harbour	State		496		
Western Heights School	1567	1–6	Western Heights	State		659		

=== Waitākere Ranges ===
Name	MOE	Years	Area	Authority	Opened	Roll	Website	Notes
Glen Eden Intermediate School	1284	7–8	Kaurilands	State		924		
Glen Eden School	1285	1–6	Glen Eden	State	1915	312		
Henderson Valley School	1311	1–6	Henderson Valley	State		322		
Kaurilands School	1328	1–6	Kaurilands	State		738		
Konini School	1335	1–6	Konini	State		412		
Laingholm School	1338	1–6	Laingholm	State		156		
Oratia School	1404	1–6	Oratia	State	1882	438		
Prospect School	1447	1–6	Glen Eden West	State		324		
Swanson School	1521	1–8	Swanson	State		544		
Titirangi School	1537	1–6	Titirangi	State		446		
Waitakere School	1557	1–8	Waitākere	State		405		
Woodlands Park School	1578	1–6	Woodlands Park	State	1958	277		

=== Great Barrier ===
Name	MOE	Years	Area	Authority	Roll	Website	Notes
Kaitoke School	1593	1–8	Medlands Beach	State	53	-	
Mulberry Grove School	1385	1–8	Tryphena	State	24		
Okiwi School	1398	1–8	Okiwi	State	33		

=== Waiheke ===
Name	MOE	Years	Area	Authority	Roll	Website	Notes
Te Huruhi School	1177	1–6	Waiheke Island	State	239		
Waiheke Primary School	6922	1–8	Waiheke Island	State	274		

=== Waitematā ===
The Waitematā local board is the central-most Auckland board, covering the Auckland central business district and several adjacent suburbs, including Freemans Bay, Grey Lynn, Grafton, Herne Bay, Newmarket, Newton, Parnell, Ponsonby and Westmere.

Name	MOE	Years	Area	Authority	Opened	Roll	Website	Notes
Bayfield School	1220	1–6	Herne Bay	State		364		
Freemans Bay School	1279	1–6	Freemans Bay	State		607		
Grey Lynn School	1301	1–6	Grey Lynn	State		248		
Kadimah School	453	1–8	Newton	State integrated	1971	347		Jewish
Marist School	1360	1–8	Ponsonby	State integrated	1928	117		Catholic
Newmarket School	1391	1–6	Newmarket	State		251		
Newton Central School	1392	1–6	Grey Lynn	State		308		
Parnell School	1436	1–8	Parnell	State	1873	520		
Ponsonby Intermediate	1445	7–8	Ponsonby	State		591		
Ponsonby Primary School	1446	1–6	Herne Bay	State	1873	308		
Richmond Road School	1463	1–6	Ponsonby	State		255		
St Joseph's School	1493	1–8	Grey Lynn	State integrated	1884	75		Catholic
Westmere School	1568	1–6	Westmere	State	1914	363		

=== Whau ===
Name	MOE	Years	Area	Authority	Roll	Website	Notes
Arahoe School	1206	1–6	New Lynn	State	415		
Avondale Intermediate	1212	7–8	Avondale	State	381		
Avondale Primary School	1213	1–6	Avondale	State	367		
Blockhouse Bay Intermediate	1232	7–8	Blockhouse Bay	State	834		
Blockhouse Bay School	1233	1–6	Blockhouse Bay	State	527		
Chaucer School	1243	1–6	Blockhouse Bay	State	197		
Fruitvale School	1281	1–6	New Lynn	State	350		
Glenavon School	1290	1–8	Blockhouse Bay	State	352		
Green Bay Primary School	1298	1–8	Green Bay	State	620		
Kelston Intermediate	1330	7–8	Kelston	State	406		
Kelston School	1331	1–6	Kelston	State	301		
New Lynn School	1389	1–6	New Lynn	State	402		
New Windsor School	1390	1–6	New Windsor	State	353		
Rosebank School	1471	1–6	Avondale	State	564		
St Dominic's Catholic School	1487	1–6	Blockhouse Bay	State integrated	264		Catholic
St Leonards Road School	1499	1–6	Kelston	State	436		
St Mary's School	1503	1–8	Avondale	State integrated	170		Catholic

=== Albert–Eden ===
Name	MOE	Years	Gender	Area	Authority	Opened	Roll	Website	Notes
Auckland Normal Intermediate	1211	7–8	Coed	Mount Eden	State		700		
Balmoral Seventh-day Adventist School	4100	1–8	Coed	Balmoral	State integrated	1950	65		
Balmoral School	1219	1–8	Coed	Balmoral	State	1926	769		
Cornwall Park School	1256	1–6	Coed	Greenlane	State	1921	676		
Edendale School	1265	1–6	Coed	Sandringham	State	1909	507		
Epsom Normal School	1270	1–6	Coed	Epsom	State	1886	611		
Ficino School	1935	1–8	Coed	Mount Eden	Private	1997	144		
Gladstone Primary School	1282	1–6	Coed	Mount Albert	State		794		
Good Shepherd School	1297	1–6	Coed	Balmoral	State integrated	1912	182		Catholic
Kohia Terrace School	6939	1–8	Coed	Epsom	State		367		
Kōwhai Intermediate School	1337	7–8	Coed	Kingsland	State	1922	553		
Marist School	1359	1–6	Coed	Mount Albert	State integrated	1927	267		Catholic
Maungawhau School	1367	1–6	Coed	Balmoral	State	1913	654		
Mount Albert School	1381	1–6	Coed	Mount Albert	State	1870	513		
Mount Eden Normal Primary School	1378	1–6	Coed	Mount Eden	State		565		
Our Lady of the Sacred Heart School	1411	1–8	Coed	Epsom	State integrated	1921	209		Catholic
Owairaka District School	1412	1–6	Coed	Owairaka	State		384	-	
Pasadena Intermediate	1437	7–8	Coed	Point Chevalier	State		361		
Point Chevalier School	1440	1–6	Coed	Point Chevalier	State	1887	622		
St Francis Catholic Primary School	1488	1–6	Coed	Point Chevalier	State integrated		269		Catholic
TKKM o Nga Maungarongo	4207	1–8	Coed	Mount Albert	State	1987	65		
Waterview School	1563	1–6	Coed	Waterview	State		255		

=== Puketapapa ===
Name	MOE	Years	Area	Authority	Roll	Website	Notes
Christ The King Catholic School	1245	1–8	New Windsor	State integrated	115		Catholic
Dominion Road School	1261	1–6	Mount Roskill	State	208		
Halsey Drive School	1302	1–6	Lynfield	State	467		
Hay Park School	1305	1–6	Mount Roskill	State	153		
Hillsborough School	1313	1–6	Hillsborough	State	353		
Marshall Laing School	1362	1–6	Lynfield	State	625		
May Road School	1368	1–6	Mount Roskill	State	178		
Monte Cecilia School	1376	1–6	Mount Roskill	State integrated	143		Catholic
Mount Roskill Intermediate	1383	7–8	Mount Roskill	State	562		
Mount Roskill Primary School	1384	1–6	Mount Roskill	State	631		
Royal Oak School	1475	1–6	Royal Oak	State	434		
St Therese School	1509	1–8	Three Kings	State integrated	83		Catholic
Three Kings School	1535	1–6	Three Kings	State	474		
Waikowhai Intermediate School	1548	7–8	Waikowhai	State	339		
Waikowhai School	1549	1–6	Waikowhai	State	198		
Wesley Intermediate	1564	7–8	Wesley	State	106		
Wesley School	1565	1–6	Wesley	State	169		

=== Ōrākei ===
Name	Years	Gender	Area	Authority	EQI (band)	Roll	Website	MOE
Churchill Park School	1–8	Coed	Glendowie	State	363 (fewest)	391		1246
Glen Taylor School	1–8	Coed	Glendowie	State	516 (many)	173		1289
Glendowie School	1–8	Coed	Glendowie	State	364 (fewest)	656		1294
King's School	1–8	Boys	Remuera	Private	n/a	761		4116
Kohimarama School	1–8	Coed	Kohimarama	State	361 (fewest)	476		1334
Meadowbank School	1–6	Coed	Remuera	State	349 (fewest)	768		1370
Mount Carmel School	1–6	Coed	Meadowbank	State integrated	354 (fewest)	202		1382
Ōrākei School	1–8	Coed	Ōrākei	State	449 (average)	242		1402
Remuera Intermediate	7–8	Coed	Remuera	State	380 (fewest)	887		1461
Remuera School	1–6	Coed	Remuera	State	348 (fewest)	569		1462
St Heliers School	1–8	Coed	Saint Heliers	State	366 (fewest)	635		1489
St Ignatius Catholic School	1–6	Coed	Saint Heliers	State integrated	354 (fewest)	218	-	1490
St Joseph's School	1–6	Coed	Ōrākei	State integrated	394 (fewest)	22		1495
St Kentigern Boys' School	1–8	Boys	Remuera	Private	n/a	658		4133
St Kentigern Girls' School	1–8	Girls	Remuera	Private	n/a	388		60
St Michael's Catholic School	1–6	Coed	Remuera	State integrated	344 (fewest)	226		1506
St Thomas School	1–8	Coed	Kohimarama	State	377 (fewest)	786		1510
Stonefields School	1–8	Coed	Stonefields	State	361 (fewest)	646		565
Victoria Avenue School	1–6	Coed	Remuera	State	344 (fewest)	400		1544

=== Maungakiekie–Tāmaki ===
The Maungakiekie–Tāmaki local board covers the south-eastern part of the Auckland isthmus. Major suburbs include Glen Innes, Mount Wellington, Onehunga, Panmure, Penrose, Point England, and parts of Royal Oak.

Name	Years	Area	Authority	EQI (band)	Roll	Website	MOE
Bailey Road School	1–8	Mount Wellington	State	488 (above average)	302	-	1216
Ellerslie School	1–8	Ellerslie	State	373 (fewest)	746		1268
Glen Innes School	1–8	Glen Innes	State	522 (most)	126	-	1287
Glenbrae Primary School	1–8	Wai o Taiki Bay	State	525 (most)	166	-	1291
Golden Grove School	1–8	Onehunga	Private	n/a	50		604
Onehunga Primary School	1–6	Onehunga	State	410 (few)	426		1399
Oranga School	1–6	One Tree Hill	State	437 (below average)	224		1403
Panama Road School	1–6	Mount Wellington	State	511 (many)	344		1418
Panmure Bridge School	1–8	Panmure	State	499 (many)	211	-	1419
Panmure District School	1–8	Panmure	State	473 (above average)	168	-	1420
Point England School	1–8	Point England	State	518 (many)	447		1441
Royal Oak Intermediate	7–8	Royal Oak	State	458 (average)	438		1351
Ruapotaka School	1–8	Point England	State	526 (most)	134		1477
St Joseph's School	1–8	Onehunga	State integrated	447 (below average)	168		1494
St Mary's School	1–8	Ellerslie	State integrated	367 (fewest)	373		1504
St Patrick's School	1–8	Panmure	State integrated	445 (below average)	71		1507
St Pius X Catholic School	1–8	Glen Innes	State integrated	501 (many)	122	-	1508
Stanhope Road School	1–8	Mount Wellington	State	415 (few)	574		1511
Sylvia Park School	1–8	Mount Wellington	State	461 (average)	581		1522
Tāmaki School	1–6	Tamaki	State	522 (most)	177	-	1526
Te Papapa School	1–6	Te Papapa	State	510 (many)	310	-	1534

=== Howick ===
Name	MOE	Years	Area	Authority	Opened	Roll	Website	Notes
Anchorage Park School	1204	1–6	Pakuranga	State		122		
Baverstock Oaks School	6960	1–8	Flat Bush	State	2005	593		
Botany Downs School	1235	1–6	Botany Downs	State		572		
Bucklands Beach Intermediate	1240	7–8	Bucklands Beach	State	1976	948		
Bucklands Beach Primary School	1241	1–6	Bucklands Beach	State		395		
Chapel Downs School	1581	1–6	Chapel Downs	State		788	-	
Cockle Bay School	1253	1–6	Cockle Bay	State	1956	737		
Elm Park School	1269	1–6	Pakuranga Heights	State	1967	479		
Farm Cove Intermediate	1272	7–8	Farm Cove	State		508		
Howick Intermediate	1318	7–8	Howick	State	1964	605		
Howick Primary School	1319	1–6	Howick West	State	1964	318		
Macleans Primary School	1388	1–6	Bucklands Beach	State		551		
Mellons Bay School	1371	1–6	Mellons Bay	State		414	-	
Mission Heights Primary School	570	1–6	Mission Heights	State	2009	679		
Ormiston Primary School	688	1–6	Flat Bush	State	2015	982		
Owairoa Primary School	1413	1–6	Howick	State	1962	805		
Pakuranga Heights School	1416	1–6	Pakuranga Heights	State		495		
Pakuranga Intermediate	1417	7–8	Pakuranga	State		278		
Pigeon Mountain School	1439	1–6	Bucklands Beach	State	1979	481		
Point View School	6921	1–6	Shamrock Park	State	1997	641		
Riverhills School	1465	1–6	Pakuranga Heights	State		129	-	
Riverina School	1466	1–6	Pakuranga	State		138		
Sancta Maria Catholic Primary School	618	1–6	Flat Bush	State integrated	2010	377		Catholic
Shelly Park Primary School	1480	1–6	Shelly Park	State	1979	454		
Somerville Intermediate School	6760	7–8	Somerville	State	1997	957		
St Mark's Catholic School	1501	1–6	Sunnyhills	State integrated		204		Catholic
Star of the Sea School	1514	1–6	Northpark	State integrated		297		Catholic
Sunnyhills School	1515	1–8	Sunnyhills	State		480		
Te Uho O Te Nikau Primary School	593	1–8	Flat Bush	State	2019	617		
Wakaaranga School	1560	1–6	Farm Cove	State		637		
Willowbank School	6959	1–6	Dannemora	State	2001	710		

=== Māngere–Ōtāhuhu ===
Name	MOE	Years	Area	Authority	Roll	Website	Notes
Fairburn School	1271	1–6	Ōtāhuhu	State	436		
Favona School	1273	1–6	Favona	State	278	-	
Jean Batten School	1322	1–6	Māngere	State	244	-	
Kingsford School	1333	1–6	Māngere East	State	340		
Koru School	1336	1–8	Favona	State	455	-	
Mangere Bridge School	1346	1–6	Māngere Bridge	State	328		
Mangere Central School	1347	1–8	Māngere	State	482	-	
Mangere East School	1348	1–8	Māngere East	State	550		
Mountain View School	1380	1–6	Māngere Bridge (suburb)	State	328		
Nga Iwi School	1393	1–6	Māngere	State	342	-	
Otahuhu Intermediate	1408	7–8	Ōtāhuhu	State	375		
Otahuhu School	1409	1–6	Ōtāhuhu	State	550		
Robertson Road School	1467	1–8	Māngere East	State	502	-	
Sir Douglas Bader Intermediate School	1215	7–8	Māngere	State	288		
St Joseph's School	1496	1–8	Ōtāhuhu	State integrated	269		Catholic
St Mary MacKillop Catholic School	1633	1–8	Māngere East	State integrated	355		Catholic
Sutton Park School	1520	1–8	Māngere East	State	533		
Viscount School	1546	1–8	Māngere	State	452		
Waterlea School	1562	1–6	Māngere Bridge	State	410		

=== Otara–Papatoetoe ===
Name	MOE	Years	Area	Authority	Roll	Website	Notes
Bairds Mainfreight Primary School	1218	1–6	Ōtara	State	331		
Dawson School	1259	1–6	Ōtara	State	284	-	
East Tamaki School	1264	1–6	Ōtara	State	171		
Ferguson Intermediate	1274	7–8	Ōtara	State	381		
Flat Bush School	1277	1–6	Ōtara	State	401		
Holy Cross School	1315	1–8	Papatoetoe	State integrated	550		Catholic
Kedgley Intermediate	1329	7–8	Māngere East	State	734		
Mayfield School	1369	1–6	Ōtara	State	298	-	
Papatoetoe Central School	1426	1–6	Papatoetoe	State	903		
Papatoetoe East School	1427	1–6	Papatoetoe	State	584		
Papatoetoe Intermediate	1428	7–8	Papatoetoe	State	722		
Papatoetoe North School	1429	1–6	Māngere East	State	752		
Papatoetoe South School	1430	1–6	Papatoetoe	State	590		
Papatoetoe West School	1431	1–6	Papatoetoe	State	670		
Puhinui School	1448	1–6	Manukau	State	768		
Redoubt North School	1460	1–8	Clover Park	State	475		
Rongomai School	1468	1–6	Ōtara	State	151		
Sir Edmund Hillary Collegiate Junior School	1251	1–6	Ōtara	State	355		
Sir Edmund Hillary Collegiate Middle School	1217	7–8	Ōtara	State	317		
South Auckland Seventh-day Adventist School	4140	1–8	Manukau	State integrated	353		Seventh-day Adventist
St John The Evangelist Catholic School	1491	1–8	Ōtara	State integrated	193		Catholic
TKKM o Piripono	4205	1–8	Ōtara	State	95		
Wymondley Road School	1579	1–6	Ōtara	State	142		
Yendarra School	1580	1–6	Ōtara	State	224		

=== Manurewa ===
Name	MOE	Years	Area	Authority	Opened	Roll	Website	Notes
Clayton Park School	1247	1–8	Wattle Downs	State		326		
Clendon Park School	1248	1–6	Clendon Park	State	1971	734		
Everglade School	1164	1–6	Goodwood Heights	State		462		
Finlayson Park School	1275	1–6	Manurewa	State		931		
Greenmeadows Intermediate	1300	7–8	Manurewa East	State		347		
Hillpark School	1312	1–6	Hillpark	State	1967	487		
Homai School	1317	1–6	Homai	State		396		
Leabank School	1339	1–6	Manurewa	State	1969	389		
Manurewa Central School	1354	1–6	Manurewa	State	1906	502		
Manurewa East School	1352	1–6	Manurewa East	State		388		
Manurewa Intermediate	1353	7–8	Manurewa	State		929		
Manurewa South School	1355	1–6	Manurewa	State		379		
Manurewa West School	1356	1–6	Manurewa	State	1966	434		
Randwick Park School	6944	1–8	Randwick Park	State	1997	695		
Reremoana Primary School	6978	1–8	Wattle Downs	State	2006	423		
Roscommon School	1470	1–6	Clendon Park	State		542		
Rowandale School	1474	1–6	Manurewa	State		564		
St Anne's Catholic School	1486	1–8	Manurewa	State integrated	1952	493		Catholic
Te Matauranga	6741	1–6	Clendon Park	State		312	-	
The Gardens School	6947	1–8	The Gardens	State	2002	528		
Te Kura Kaupapa Māori o Manurewa	4229	1–8	Clendon Park	State		139	–	
Waimahia Intermediate School	1569	7–8	Clendon Park	State		238		
Weymouth School	1570	1–6	Weymouth	State		551		
Wiri Central School	1576	1–8	Wiri	State		352		

=== Papakura ===
Name	MOE	Years	Area	Authority	Opened	Roll	Website	Notes
Conifer Grove School	1255	1–8	Conifer Grove	State		540		
Cosgrove School	1257	1–6	Papakura	State		604		
Drury School	1263	1–8	Drury	State	1857	337		
Edmund Hillary School	1267	1–8	Papakura	State	1963	189		
Hingaia Peninsula School	588	1–8	Hingaia	State	2012	433		
Holy Trinity Catholic Primary School	743	1–6	Takanini	State integrated	2017	302		Catholic
Kauri Flats School	595	1–8	Takanini	State	2017	703		
Kelvin Road School	1332	1–6	Papakura	State		244		
Kereru Park Campus	1424	1–8	Rosehill	State		157	-	
Opaheke School	1401	1–8	Ōpaheke	State	1968	618		
Papakura Central School	1421	1–6	Papakura	State		447		
Papakura Intermediate	1422	7–8	Papakura	State		313		
Papakura Normal School	1423	1–8	Papakura	State		768		
Park Estate School	1434	1–6	Rosehill	State		277		
Redhill School	1459	1–8	Red Hill	State		205		
Rosehill Intermediate	1473	7–8	Rosehill	State		389		
St Mary's Catholic School	1502	1–6	Pahurehure	State integrated	1954	389		Catholic
Takanini School	1523	1–8	Takanini	State		586		

=== Franklin ===
Name	MOE	Years	Area	Authority	Roll	Website	Notes
Alfriston School	1203	1–8	Alfriston	State	374		
Ararimu School	1207	1–8	Ararimu	State	104		
Ardmore School	1208	1–8	Ardmore	State	343	-	
Awhitu District School	1214	1–8	Āwhitu Peninsula	State	108		
Beachlands School	1224	1–8	Beachlands	State	617		
Bombay School	1234	1–8	Bombay	State	372		
Brookby School	1236	1–8	Brookby	State	116		
Buckland School	1239	1–8	Buckland	State	276	-	
Clevedon School	1249	1–8	Clevedon	State	369	-	
Glenbrook School	1292	1–8	Glenbrook	State	299		
Hunua School	1321	1–8	Hunua	State	155		
Karaka School	1325	1–8	Karaka	State	242		
KingsGate School	603	1–8	Pukekohe	State integrated	286		
Maraetai Beach School	1357	1–8	Maraetai	State	430		
Mauku School	1366	1–6	Puni	State	154		
Orere School	1405	1–8	Orere Point	State	38	-	
Paerata School	1414	1–8	Paerata	State	177	-	
Paparimu School	1425	1–8	Ararimu	State	36		
Patumahoe Primary School	1438	1–6	Patumahoe	State	268	-	
Pukekohe East School	1450	1–6	Pukekohe	State	154		
Pukekohe Hill School	1451	1–6	Pukekohe	State	542		
Pukekohe Intermediate	1452	7–8	Pukekohe	State	689		
Pukekohe North School	1453	1–8	Pukekohe	State	347		
Puni School	1455	1–6	Puni	State	206		
Ramarama School	1456	1–8	Ramarama	State	218		
Sandspit Road School	1479	1–8	Waiuku	State	268		
St Joseph's School	1497	1–6	Pukekohe	State integrated	340		
Tamaoho School	625	1–6	Pukekohe	State	333		
Te Hihi School	1532	1–8	Karaka	State	139		
TKKM o Waiuku	3102	1–8	Waiuku	State	25	-	
Valley School	1540	1–6	Pukekohe	State	463	-	
View Road School	1545	1–8	Waiuku	State	185	-	
Waiau Pa School	1547	1–8	Waiau Pa	State	342		
Waipipi School	1554	1–8	Āwhitu Peninsula	State	109	-	
Waiuku Primary School	1559	1–8	Waiuku	State	368	-	

== Secondary schools ==
Name	MOE	Years	Gender	Suburb	Authority	Opened	EQI (band)	Roll	Website	Notes
Albany Junior High School	6948	7–10	Coed	Albany	State	2005	408 (few)	1,128		
Albany Senior High School	563	11–13	Coed	Albany	State	2009	446 (below average)	765		
Alfriston College	6929	9–13	Coed	Alfriston	State	2004	496 (many)	1,273		
Ambury Park Centre for Riding Therapy	462	9–13	Coed	Māngere Bridge	Private		n/a	3		
Aorere College	96	9–13	Coed	Papatoetoe	State	1964	497 (many)	1,701		
Auckland Girls' Grammar School	53	9–13	Girls	Newton	State	1888	485 (above average)	1,191		
Auckland Grammar School	54	9–13	Boys	Epsom	State	1869	386 (fewest)	2,767		Boarding
Auckland Seventh-Day Adventist High School	93	9–13	Coed	Māngere Bridge	State integrated	1970	489 (above average)	333		Seventh-day Adventist
Avondale College	78	9–13	Coed	Avondale	State	1945	439 (below average)	2,789		
Baradene College of the Sacred Heart	61	7–13	Girls	Remuera	State integrated	1909	370 (fewest)	1,531		Catholic
Birkenhead College	31	9–13	Coed	Birkdale	State	1972	464 (average)	475		
Botany Downs Secondary College	6930	9–13	Coed	Dannemora	State	2004	403 (few)	1,994		
Carmel College	35	7–13	Girls	Milford	State integrated	1957	382 (fewest)	1,100		Catholic
De La Salle College	94	7–13	Boys	Māngere East	State integrated	1953	484 (above average)	971		Catholic
Edgewater College	79	9–13	Coed	Pakuranga	State		497 (many)	639		
Epsom Girls' Grammar School	64	9–13	Girls	Epsom	State	1917	402 (fewest)	2,316		Boarding
Glendowie College	65	9–13	Coed	Glendowie	State	1961	392 (fewest)	1,195		
Glenfield College	30	9–13	Coed	Glenfield	State		466 (average)	768		
Green Bay High School	42	9–13	Coed	Green Bay	State	1973	430 (below average)	1,959		
Henderson High School	45	9–13	Coed	Henderson	State	1953	481 (above average)	1,048		
Hobsonville Point Secondary School	6977	9–13	Coed	Hobsonville	State	2014	430 (below average)	1,056		
Howick College	87	9–13	Coed	Somerville	State	1974	432 (below average)	2,218		
Te Haikura a Kiwa	100	9–13	Coed	Manurewa	State	1968	529 (most)	1,867		
Kaipara College	26	9–13	Coed	Helensville	State		460 (average)	721		
Kelston Boys' High School	83	9–13	Boys	Kelston	State	1963	505 (many)	821		
Kelston Girls' College	84	9–13	Girls	Kelston	State	1963	507 (many)	594		
Kia Aroha College	631	1–13	Coed	Clover Park	State		539 (most)	319		
King's College	89	9–13	Boys/Coed	Ōtāhuhu	Private	1896	n/a	1,233		Anglican, Boarding
Liston College	46	7–13	Boys	Henderson North	State integrated	1974	414 (few)	856		Catholic
Long Bay College	27	9–13	Coed	Long Bay	State	1975	422 (few)	1,960		
Lynfield College	75	9–13	Coed	Lynfield	State	1958	417 (few)	2,017		
Macleans College	41	9–13	Coed	Bucklands Beach	State	1980	385 (fewest)	3,078		
Mahurangi College	24	7–13	Coed	Warkworth	State		441 (below average)	1,581		
Māngere College	91	9–13	Coed	Māngere	State	1971	521 (many)	772		
Manurewa High School	99	9–13	Coed	Homai	State	1960	508 (many)	2,384		
Marcellin College	63	7–13	Coed	Royal Oak	State integrated	1958	470 (above average)	466		Catholic
Marist College	70	7–13	Girls	Mount Albert	State integrated	1928	398 (fewest)	766		Catholic
Massey High School	43	9–13	Coed	Massey West	State	1969	486 (above average)	2,113		
McAuley High School	90	9–13	Girls	Ōtāhuhu	State integrated	1962	483 (above average)	770		Catholic
Mission Heights Junior College	553	7–10	Coed	Mission Heights	State	2009	407 (few)	934		
Mount Albert Grammar School	69	9–13	Coed	Mount Albert	State	1922	415 (few)	3,625		Boarding
Mount Roskill Grammar School	74	9–13	Coed	Mount Roskill	State	1954	444 (below average)	1,919		
Northcote College	32	9–13	Coed	Northcote	State	1877	428 (few)	1,603		
One Tree Hill College	85	9–13	Coed	Penrose	State	1955	466 (average)	1,472		
Onehunga High School	86	9–13	Coed	Onehunga	State	1959	478 (above average)	1,010		
Orewa College	25	7–13	Coed	Orewa	State	1956	432 (below average)	2,282		
Ormiston Junior College	709	7–10	Coed	Flat Bush	State	2017	424 (few)	1,509		
Ormiston Senior College	564	11–13	Coed	Flat Bush	State	2011	443 (below average)	1,539		
Otahuhu College	88	9–13	Coed	Ōtāhuhu	State	1931	509 (many)	1,151		
Pakūranga College	80	9–13	Coed	Half Moon Bay	State	1961	431 (below average)	2,270		
Papakura High School	101	9–13	Coed	Papakura	State	1954	531 (most)	1,337		
Papatoetoe High School	95	9–13	Coed	Papatoetoe	State	1956	472 (above average)	1,815		
Pukekohe High School	103	9–13	Coed	Pukekohe	State	1921	465 (average)	1,938		
Rangitoto College	28	9–13	Coed	Windsor Park	State	1956	397 (fewest)	4,167		
Rodney College	23	9–13	Coed	Wellsford	State		489 (above average)	368		
Rosehill College	102	9–13	Coed	Rosehill	State	1970	473 (above average)	1,772		
Rosmini College	39	7–13	Boys	Takapuna	State integrated	1962	387 (fewest)	1,208		Catholic
Rutherford College	40	9–13	Coed	Te Atatū Peninsula	State	1961	459 (average)	1,607		
Sacred Heart College	59	7–13	Boys	Glendowie	State integrated	1903	394 (fewest)	1,511		Catholic, Boarding
Sancta Maria College	491	7–13	Coed	Flat Bush	State integrated	2004	390 (fewest)	1,049		Catholic
Selwyn College	49	9–13	Coed	Kohimarama	State	1956	411 (few)	1,588		
Sir Edmund Hillary Collegiate Senior School	97	9–13	Coed	Ōtara	State	1966	525 (most)	664		
South Auckland Middle School	876	7–10	Coed	Weymouth	State	2014	488 (above average)	180		Designated character (s156)
St Dominic's Catholic College	47	7–13	Girls	Henderson North	State integrated	1952	423 (few)	851		Catholic
St Ignatius of Loyola Catholic College	949	7–13	Coed	Drury	State integrated	2024	419 (few)	608		Catholic
St Kentigern College	81	7–13	Coed	Pakuranga	Private	1953	n/a	2,343		Presbyterian, Boarding
St Mary's College	50	7–13	Girls	Saint Marys Bay	State integrated	1850	388 (fewest)	998		Catholic
St Paul's College	51	7–13	Boys	Ponsonby	State integrated	1955	480 (above average)	395		Catholic
St Peter's College	62	7–13	Boys	Grafton	State integrated	1939	383 (fewest)	1,318		Catholic
Takapuna Grammar School	36	9–13	Coed	Belmont	State	1927	393 (fewest)	2,265		
Tāmaki College	57	9–13	Coed	Glen Innes	State	1955	526 (most)	720		
Tangaroa College	58	9–13	Coed	Ōtara	State	1976	521 (many)	1,088		
Te Wharekura o Manurewa	3113	9–13	Coed	Manurewa	State		547 (most)	76	—	
UP International College Auckland	1606	9–13	Coed	Auckland CBD	Private	2005	n/a	159		
Vanguard Military School	854	11–13	Coed	Rosedale	State	2014	494 (many)	163	—	Designated character (s156)
Waiheke High School	530	7–13	Coed	Waiheke Island	State	1986	442 (below average)	387		
Waitakere College	44	9–13	Coed	Henderson North	State	1975	480 (above average)	1,988		
Waiuku College	105	9–13	Coed	Waiuku	State		476 (above average)	1,002		
Wentworth College	484	7–13	Coed	Gulf Harbour	Private	2003	n/a	468		
Wesley College	104	9–13	Coed	Paerata	State integrated	1844	509 (many)	330		Methodist, Boarding
Western Springs College	48	9–13	Coed	Western Springs	State	1964	422 (few)	1,758		
Westlake Boys High School	37	9–13	Boys	Takapuna	State	1962	399 (fewest)	2,773		
Westlake Girls High School	38	9–13	Girls	Takapuna	State	1962	403 (few)	2,289		
Whangaparaoa College	6763	7–13	Coed	Stanmore Bay	State	2005	447 (below average)	1,904		
Zayed College for Girls	471	7–13	Girls	Māngere	State integrated		433 (below average)	194		Islamic

== Composite schools ==
Name	MOE	Gender	Suburb	Authority	Opened	Roll	Website	Notes
ACG Parnell College	2085	Coed	Parnell	Private	1998	1,963		
ACG Strathallan	441	Coed	Hingaia	Private	2001	1,263		
ACG Sunderland	571	Coed	Lincoln	Private	2007	886		
Al-Madinah School	544	Coed	Māngere	Integrated		551		Islamic
Atea College	460	Coed	Panmure	Private	1987	17		Evangelical Christian
City Impact Church School	481	Coed	Oteha	Private	2005	351		
Destiny School	1655	Coed	Wiri	Private		13		Evangelical Christian
Dilworth School	66	Boys	Epsom	Private	1906	506		Boarding
Diocesan School for Girls	67	Girls	Epsom	Private	1903	1,725		Anglican, Boarding
Drury Christian School	506	Coed	Drury	Private		33		Christian
Elim Christian College	1190	Coed	Botany Downs	Integrated	1988	1,071		Evangelical Christian
Kingsway School	432	Coed	Red Beach	Integrated		2,078		Non-denominational Christian
Kristin School	29	Coed	Albany	Private	1973	1,743		Christian
Manukau Christian School	466	Coed	Manurewa	Private		314		Christian
Michael Park School	424	Coed	Ellerslie	Integrated	1979	317		Waldorf education
Mount Hobson Middle School	487	Coed	Remuera	Private		45		
Pinehurst School	440	Coed	Albany	Private	1991	1,145		
Pukekohe Christian School	456	Coed	Buckland	Private		323		Christian
Southern Cross Campus	452	Coed	Māngere East	State	1997	1,678		
St Cuthbert's College	68	Girls	Epsom	Private	1915	1,643		Presbyterian, Boarding
TKKM o Puau Te Moananui-a-Kiwa	4228	Coed	Glen Innes	State		87	-	
Te Kura Maori o Nga Tapuwae	630	Coed	Māngere East	State		334		
Titirangi Rudolf Steiner School	1595	Coed	Woodlands Park	Private	1987	182		Waldorf education
TKKM o Hoani Waititi	279	Coed	Glen Eden West	State		239		
TKKM o Mangere	4208	Coed	Māngere	State		292		
TKKM o Te Raki Paewhenua	1584	Coed	Windsor Park	State		148	—	
Tyndale Park Christian School	52	Coed	Flat Bush	Private		115		Christian

== Special schools and teen parent units ==
Name	Type	Gender	Local board	Suburb	Authority	Decile	Roll	Website	MOE
Arohanui Special School	Intellectual impairments	Coed	Henderson–Massey	Te Atatū South	State	5	277		1209
Blind and Low Vision Education Network NZ	Vision impaired	Coed	Manurewa	Manurewa	State	3	76		4156
Central Auckland Specialist School	Intellectual impairments	Coed	Puketapapa	Three Kings	State	-	288		840
Clendon Teen Parent Unit	Teen parent unit	-	Manurewa	Clendon	State	1	0	-	2762
Eden Campus	Teen parent unit	-	Albert–Eden	Mount Eden	State	1	0		2760
He Wero o nga Wahine	Teen parent unit	-	Henderson–Massey	Henderson	State	1	0		612
Mount Richmond School	Intellectual impairments	Coed	Māngere–Ōtāhuhu	Ōtāhuhu	State	2	204		1379
Northern Health School	Regional health school	Coed	Waitemata	Auckland CBD	State	1	6		1210
Oaklynn Special School	Intellectual impairments	Coed	Whau	New Lynn	State	4	228		1397
Parkside School	Intellectual impairments	Coed	Franklin	Pukekohe	State	5	176		1435
Rosehill School	Intellectual impairments	Coed	Papakura	Rosehill	State	3	343		1472
Sir Keith Park School	Intellectual impairments	Coed	Māngere–Ōtāhuhu	Favona	State	1	188		1483
Sommerville School	Intellectual impairments	Coed	Maungakiekie–Tamaki	Tamaki	State	5	399		1484
Tangaroa College Teen Parent Unit	Teen parent unit	-	Otara–Papatoetoe	Ōtara	State	1	0	-	555
Wairau Valley School	Intellectual impairments	Coed	Kaipatiki	Wairau Valley	State	9	296		1556
Westbridge Residential School	Learning/social difficulties	Coed	Henderson–Massey	Massey North	State	3	3	-	4157
Wilson School	Physical and intellectual disabilities	Coed	Devonport–Takapuna	Belmont	State	9	136		1574

== Closed schools ==
Name	Years	Gender	Suburb	Authority	Date of closure	Reason of closure	Ref
Auckland International College	11–13	Coed	Blockhouse Bay	Private	June 2023	Difficulty in attracting international students	
Auckland Montessori Primary School	1–8	Coed	Parnell	Private	January 2011	closed voluntarily	
Clover Park Middle School	7–13	Coed		State	January 2011	merged with Te Whanau o Tupuranga to become Kia Aroha College	
The Corelli International Academic School of the Arts	1–13	Coed		Private	April 2016	receivership	
Destiny College	7–15	Coed		Private	January 2011	merged with Destiny School	
Hill Top School	1–8	Coed	Blockhouse Bay	Private	January 2011	closed voluntarily	
Kelston Deaf Education Centre	Special	Coed	Kelston	State	20 July 2020	merged with other state schools	
Living Way Learning Centre	1–15	Coed	Wellsford	Private	31 December 2018	closed voluntarily	
MindAlive	1–15	Coed	Auckland CBD	Private	30 August 2023	closed voluntarily	
Odyssey House School	9–13	Coed	New Windsor	Private	29 February 2024	closed voluntarily	
Pakuranga Health Camp School	Special	Coed	Half Moon Bay	State	January 2012	closed by Minister	
St Stephen's Native School		Boys	Bombay Hills	Private		closed voluntarily	
Tamaki Intermediate	7–8	Coed	Tamaki	State	January 2012	closed by Minister	
Tau Te Arohanoa Akoranga	1–12	Coed	Helensville	Private	February 2011	merged with Kingsway School	
Te Kura Akonga o Manurewa	1–8	Coed	Randwick Park	State integrated	13 July 2025		
Te Whanau o Tupuranga	7–10	Coed		State	January 2011	merged with Clover Park Middle School to become Kia Aroha College	
Titirangi Rudolf Steiner High School	9–15	Coed	Woodlands Park	Private	January 2013	merged with Titirangi Rudolf Steiner School	
TKKM Pumau Ki Te Reo o Ngapuhi	1–8	Coed	Kelston	State	April 2011	closed by Minister	

- Kelston High School – opened 1954, became Kelston Girls High School (later College) in 1963 after Kelston Boys' High School opened
- Westlake High School – opened 1958, became Westlake Girls High School in 1962 after Westlake Boys High School opened.
