= TRSS =

TRSS may refer to:

- Titirangi Rudolf Steiner School, a Waldorf school in Auckland, New Zealand
- Tri-Ratna Secondary School, a school established in 1993 for Buthanese refugees in eastern Nepal
- Tumbler Ridge Secondary School, a public school in Tumbler Ridge, British Columbia, Canada.
- TrSS, Ship prefix for a Triple-Screw Steamship
