= Susan Moller Okin =

NZ feminist political philosopher

- Born: 19 July 1946; Auckland, New Zealand
- Died: 3 March 2004 (aged 57); Lincoln, Massachusetts, U.S.

Education
- Education: University of Auckland Somerville College, Oxford Harvard University

Philosophical work
- Main interests: Feminist political philosophy Feminist legal theory
- Notable works: Is Multiculturalism Bad for Women?

Susan Moller Okin (19 July 1946 – 3 March 2004) was a liberal feminist political philosopher and author.

== Life ==
Okin was born in 1946 in Auckland, New Zealand. She attended Remuera Primary School and Remuera Intermediate and Epsom Girls' Grammar School, where she was Dux in 1963.

She earned a bachelor's degree from the University of Auckland in 1966, a master of philosophy degree from Somerville College, Oxford in 1970 and a doctorate from Harvard in 1975.

She taught at the University of Auckland, Vassar, Brandeis and Harvard before joining Stanford's faculty.

Okin became the Marta Sutton Weeks Professor of Ethics in Society at Stanford University in 1990. She held a visiting professorship at Harvard University's Radcliffe Institute for Advanced Study at the time of her death in 2004.

Okin was found dead in her home in Lincoln, Massachusetts, on 3 March 2004. She was 57. The cause of death is still unknown, but authorities do not believe there was any foul play.

== Works ==
Okin, like many liberal feminists of her time, highlighted the many ways in which gender-based discrimination defeats women's aspirations; they defended reforms intended to make social and political equality a reality for women.

In 1979, she published Women in Western Political Thought, in which she details the history of the perceptions of women in western political philosophy.

Her 1989 book Justice, Gender and Family is a critique of modern theories of justice. These theories include the liberalism of John Rawls, the libertarianism of Robert Nozick, and the communitarianism of Alasdair MacIntyre and Michael Walzer. For each theorist's major work she argues that a foundational assumption is incorrect because of a faulty perception of gender or family relations. More broadly, according to Okin, these theorists write from a male perspective that wrongly assumes that the institution of the family is just. She believes that the family perpetuates gender inequalities throughout all of society, particularly because children acquire their values and ideas in the family's sexist setting, then grow up to enact these ideas as adults. If a theory of justice is to be complete, Okin asserts that it must include women and it must address the gender inequalities she believes are prevalent in modern-day families.

Okin discusses two opposing feminist approaches to ending legal sex-based discrimination against women in her 1991 essay "Sexual Difference, Feminism, and the Law". She says that examining the history and current ramifications of sex-based discrimination, and debating the best way to end inequality between the sexes, were prominent topics in that decade of feminist legal theory. Okin contrasts Wendy Kaminer's A Fearful Freedom, which champions an equal rights approach, backing gender-neutral laws and equal, not special treatment for women, with Deborah Rhode's Justice and Gender, which argues that an equal rights approach is insufficient to compensate for the past discrimination against women. In Okin's view, a failure to address whether the differences between men and women are founded in biology or culture is a shortcoming of both arguments. The essay concludes with a call to the feminists on both sides to stop fighting against one another, and work together in improving the disadvantaged situations of many women at the time.

In 1993, with Jane Mansbridge, she summarized much of her own and others' work in the article on "Feminism," in Robert E. Goodin and Philip Petit, eds., A Companion to Contemporary Political Philosophy, 269-290, (Oxford: Blackwell, 1993), and the next year, also with Mansbridge, published a two-volume collection of feminist writing, entitled Feminism (schools of thought in politics).[Aldershot, England and Brookfield, Vermont, USA: E. Elgar. ISBN 9781852785659].

In her 1999 essay, later expanded into an anthology, Is Multiculturalism Bad for Women? Okin argues that a concern for the preservation of cultural diversity should not overshadow the discriminatory nature of gender roles in many traditional minority cultures, that, at the very least, "culture" should not be used as an excuse for rolling back the women's rights movement.

== Selected bibliography ==
=== Books ===
- Okin, Susan Moller (1979). Women in Western political thought. Princeton, New Jersey: Princeton University Press. ISBN 9780691021911.
- Okin, Susan Moller (1989). Justice, gender, and the family. New York: Basic Books. ISBN 9780465037032.
- Okin, Susan Moller; Mansbridge, Jane (1994). Feminism. Schools of Thought in Politics. Aldershot, England Brookfield, Vermont, USA: E. Elgar. ISBN 9781852785659.
- Okin, Susan Moller; Nussbaum, Martha; Cohen, Joshua; Howard, Matthew (1999). Is multiculturalism bad for women?. Princeton, New Jersey: Princeton University Press. ISBN 9780691004327. Originally an essay (pdf).

=== Chapters in books ===
- Okin, Susan Moller; Mansbridge, Jane (2005), "Feminism", in Goodin, Robert E.; Petit, Philip (eds.), A companion to contemporary political philosophy, Oxford, UK: Blackwell Publishing, pp. 269–290, ISBN 9781405130653.

=== Journal articles ===
- Okin, Susan Moller (January 1989). "Reason and feeling in thinking about justice". Ethics. 99 (2): 229–249. doi:10.1086/293064. JSTOR 2381433. S2CID 143895813.

See also: Jaggar, Alison M. (July 2015). "On Susan Moller Okin's "Reason and feeling in thinking about justice"". Ethics. 125 (4): 1132–1135. doi:10.1086/680879. hdl:1874/319596. JSTOR 10.1086/680879. S2CID 143087659.

== See also ==
- Liberal feminism
- Feminist legal theory

== Sources ==
- Debra Satz and Rob Reich, Toward a Humanist Justice: The Political Philosophy of Susan Moller Okin (Oxford, 2009).
- Judith Galtry, "Susan Moller Okin: A New Zealand tribute ten years on" (Women's Studies Journal, Volume 28 Number 2, December 2014: 93-102. ISSN 1173-6615) http://www.wsanz.org.nz/journal/docs/WSJNZ282Galtry93-102.pdf
