= Kristin School =

Location
- 360 Albany Highway; Albany; Auckland 0632; New Zealand; 36°44′31″S 174°41′27″E

Information
- Funding type: Private
- Motto: Progress with vision, integrity and love
- Established: 1973
- Ministry of Education Institution no.: 29
- Executive principal: Kim Green
- Gender: Co-educational
- Enrolment: 1,743 (July 2026)
- Socio-economic decile: 10Z
- Website: www.kristin.school.nz

Kristin School is a private co-educational composite school located in Albany, North Shore, New Zealand. Kristin is an IB World School with approximately 1,743 students.

The school was established in 1973 by a small group of parents, and is owned by the Kristin School Charitable Trust (non-profit making – fees are used to pay expenses and facilities) and is governed by trustees and governors appointed from both the school and the wider community.

Kristin contains a Kindergarten as well as an Early Learning Centre known as Little Doves and is divided into three separate schools – Junior (years 0–6), Middle (years 7–10), and Senior (years 11–13). Each school has its own principal and an executive principal has overall responsibility to the Board of Governors.

== History ==
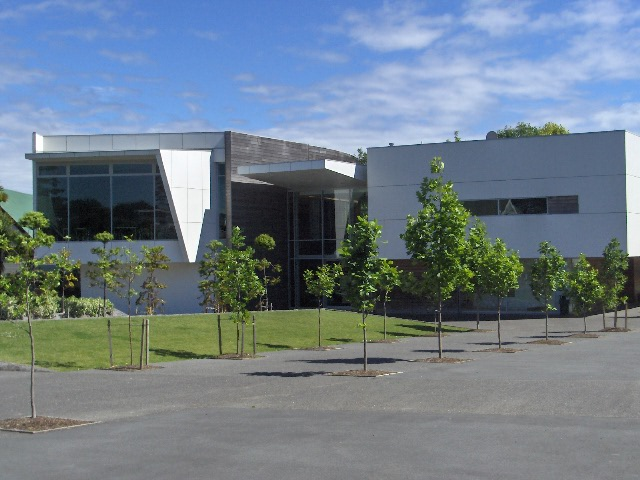
Kristin School's Library information centre built in 2004

At the end of 1972 St Anne's, a private school in Takapuna on Auckland's North Shore, was forced to close. Concerned parents held meetings and decided to start a new school, which opened in February 1973, using the leased Methodist Health Camp at Campbells Bay. The initial roll was 42 children with a staff of five. Fees were $100 per term. Immediately a search was carried out to find a permanent home for the future. The school grew rapidly, and soon a suitable site was found at Albany, where Kristin opened in 1978 with a roll of 235. The roll in 2007 had grown to a total of approximately 1670 students.

== Enrolment ==
As an independent not-for-profit school, Kristin School charges tuition fees to cover costs. For the 2026 school year, tuition fees for New Zealand residents are $24,021 per year for students in years 0 to 6, $29,669 per year for students in years 7 to 10, and $30,291 per year for students in years 11 to 13.

As of July 2026, Kristin College has roll of 1,743 students, of which 42 (2.4%) identify as Māori. As a private school, the school is not assigned an Equity Index.

== Curriculum ==
- International Baccalaureate:
  - Primary Years Programme – For Years 1 to 6
  - Middle Years Programme – For Years 7 to 10
  - Diploma programme – For Year 12 and 13 students
- New Zealand NCEA
  - Level 2 – Generally taken in Year 12
  - Level 3 – Generally taken in Year 13

Starting in 2020, Year 11 students no longer complete NCEA Level 1.

== House system ==
Kristin School has a house system consisting of four houses: Mariner, Jupiter, Apollo, and Saturn. The houses are named after the corresponding space probes launched by NASA. The naming of the houses after the space probes reflects the school's and the greater Albany region's historical origins. Founded in 1973, space exploration was at the forefront of human progression and the school's houses were named to reflect the same pioneering spirit the founding parents of the school held. Many of the streets in the area reflect the importance of this era also most notably William Pickering Drive. William Pickering was a New Zealand rocket scientist that worked for NASA involved with these space probes. Others such as Constellation and Apollo Drive can be noted.

Houses compete against each other in sporting codes such as Cross Country and Athletics as well as Cultural events such as House Music. House Music had its inception in 2005 and is an event where each house competes with musical theatre numbers the students have devised. House Points can also be won for academic merit, good behaviour and other achievements at the discretion of the teaching staff.

In the Senior School, the houses provide the framework for the pastoral care system. From Years 11–13 each house has a dean in charge of the students for each of the Houses. In Year 11 and Year 12, annual school camps are grouped by houses, and each house has its own student council to initiate community service projects within the wider school community.

== Kristin fashion show ==
Originally named the "CanTeen Fashion Show", the event was started by Claire Ashenden and Tom McRae in 1998 after a close friend and classmate died as a result of cancer. The students thought that a positive way to help other teens in this situation would be to raise money. They decided to this by hosting a fashion show, and passing all proceeds onto CanTeen, a New Zealand organisation who works to provide support for teenagers with cancer.

Eight years on, the name was changed to "Kristin Fashion Show" (as proceeds are now divided between The Child Cancer Foundation and CanTeen). This event featured some of New Zealand's top clothing labels, which were all modelled by Kristin students, who range in age from 5 to 18. Raffles and auctions are held during the show, again with all proceeds going to CanTeen and the Child Cancer Foundation.

Every year the fashion show committee strived to find way to increase audience enjoyment, and the amount raised for these charities, in 2007 the show raised $30,000 NZD. Over the two nights of the show around 3,000 people tended to attend. The show relied entirely on sponsorship from the community, and gained no funding from Kristin School itself.

The Kristin Fashion Show, after many years of running, had its finale show in June 2012.

== Kristin robotics ==
Kristin School has become part of a worldwide robotics competition known as VEX Robotics, along with many other schools on the North Shore. The entirely student organised team has been named K-Force and consists of students ranging from Year 7 to Year 13 who have put their name forward to become part of various sections of the organisation. However, as of November 2024, this program is no longer operating.

== Euphony ==
Euphony is Kristin's premier Senior School Choir for upper voices. The choir is composed of generally four vocal groups, SSAA, however it may vary between various pieces. Euphony often makes to the National Finale of "The Big Sing", winning various awards. In 2007, Euphony won a prestigious Gold award at the National Finale in Christchurch and in 2008 won a Silver award in Wellington. Euphony also won both a Gold award and the Youth Ambassadors award in 2010 at the National Finale in Auckland and stood apart from other choirs with their memorable piece "Tjak!". In 2011, the Big Sing National Finale was held in Wellington again and Euphony won a silver award. In 2012 Euphony won the inaugural award for the best recital by a female choir at the Auckland region of the Big Sing (and won this again in 2013), then went on to win a gold award at the finale in Wellington. In July 2013 Euphony represented New Zealand at the International Musical Eisteddfod in Llangollen, Wales, where the choir was placed 3rd in the open female choir category and 7th= in the senior children's choir category. In September 2013 Euphony went to the Big Sing National Finale and won a gold award. In 2014 Euphony attended the Big Sing Regionals in Auckland and won the inaugural award for the best recital by a female choir at the Auckland region of the Big Sing for the third time.

== See also ==
- List of schools in North Shore City
