= Manurewa West School =

School in Manurewa, New Zealand

Location
- 31 McKean Avenue, Manurewa, Auckland 2102, New Zealand; 37.024393°S 174.886906°E

Information
- Type: State Co-Ed Contributing (Year 1-6)
- Ministry of Education Institution no.: 1356
- Principal: Kogie Naidoo
- Enrolment: 434 (July 2026)
- Website: www.manurewawest.school.nz

Manurewa West School, also known as Manurewa West Primary School, is a primary school (years 1–6) in Manurewa, South Auckland, New Zealand.

== History ==
Manurewa West School opened in 1963, with a roll of 362 students. During the first years of the school's operation, staff placed importance on interesting programmes and trips, such as field trips to the Manurewa Fire Station, Auckland Police Station and the Meremere Power Station.

In 2018, deputy principal Shea Bowden revised the school's standard maths curriculum, by introducing mixed-ability class groupings, real-life contexts and incorporating the cultures of the schools' communities. This led to student achievement in maths significantly improving by 2021, leading to Bowden winning the Primary School Apple at the 2022 National Excellence in Teaching Awards.
