= Ararimu =

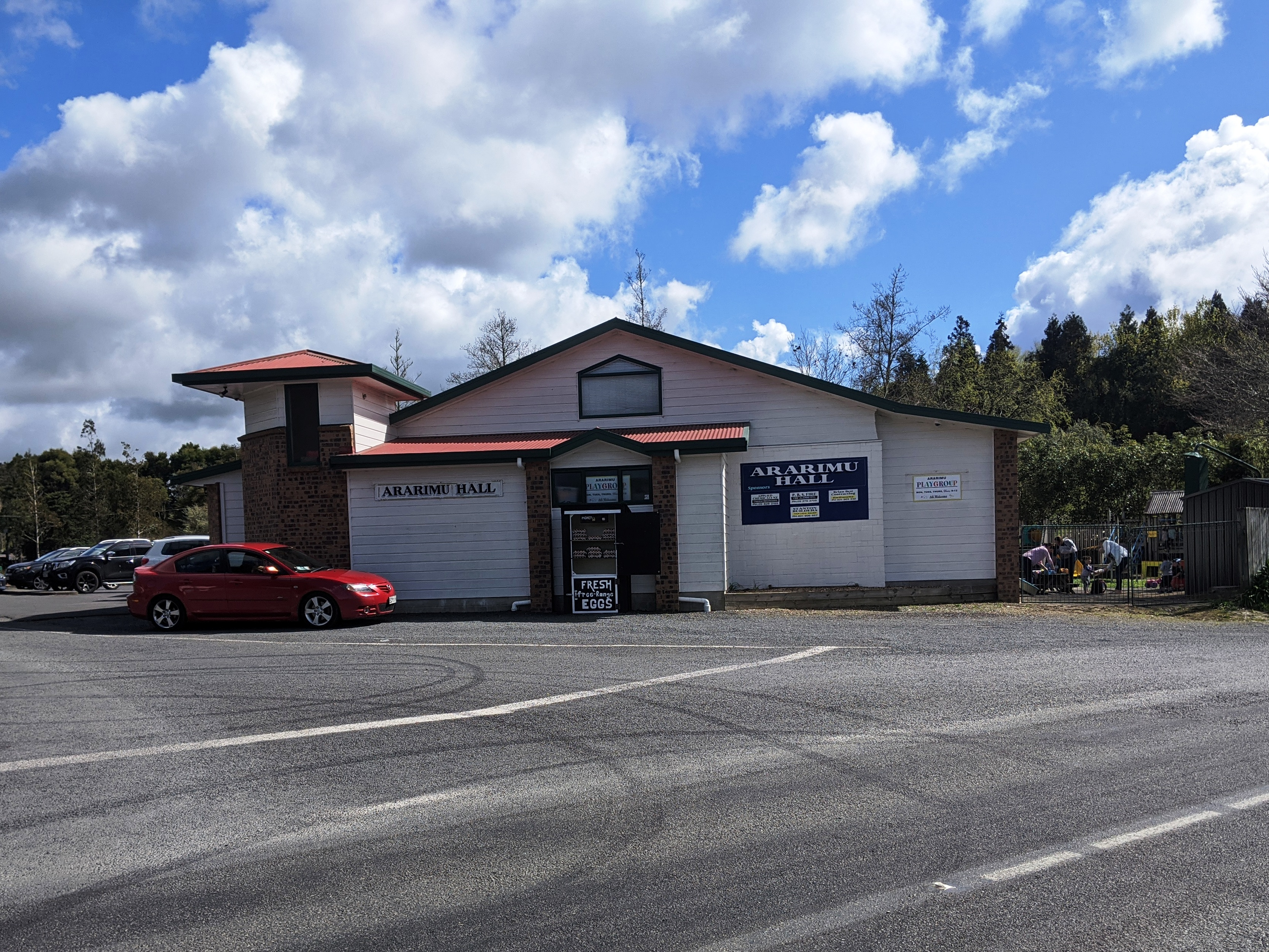
- Ararimu community hall
- Interactive map of Ararimu
- Coordinates: 37.140°S 175.038°E
- Country: New Zealand
- Region: Auckland Region
- Territorial authority: Auckland Council
- Ward: Franklin ward
- Board: Franklin Local Board
- Electorates: Papakura; Hauraki-Waikato

Government
  - Mayor of Auckland: Wayne Brown
  - Papakura MP: Vacant
  - Hauraki-Waikato MP: Hana-Rawhiti Maipi-Clarke

Area
  - Total: 90.93 km^{2} (35.11 sq mi)

Population (June 2025)
  - Total: 2,250
  - Density: 24.7/km^{2} (64.1/sq mi)

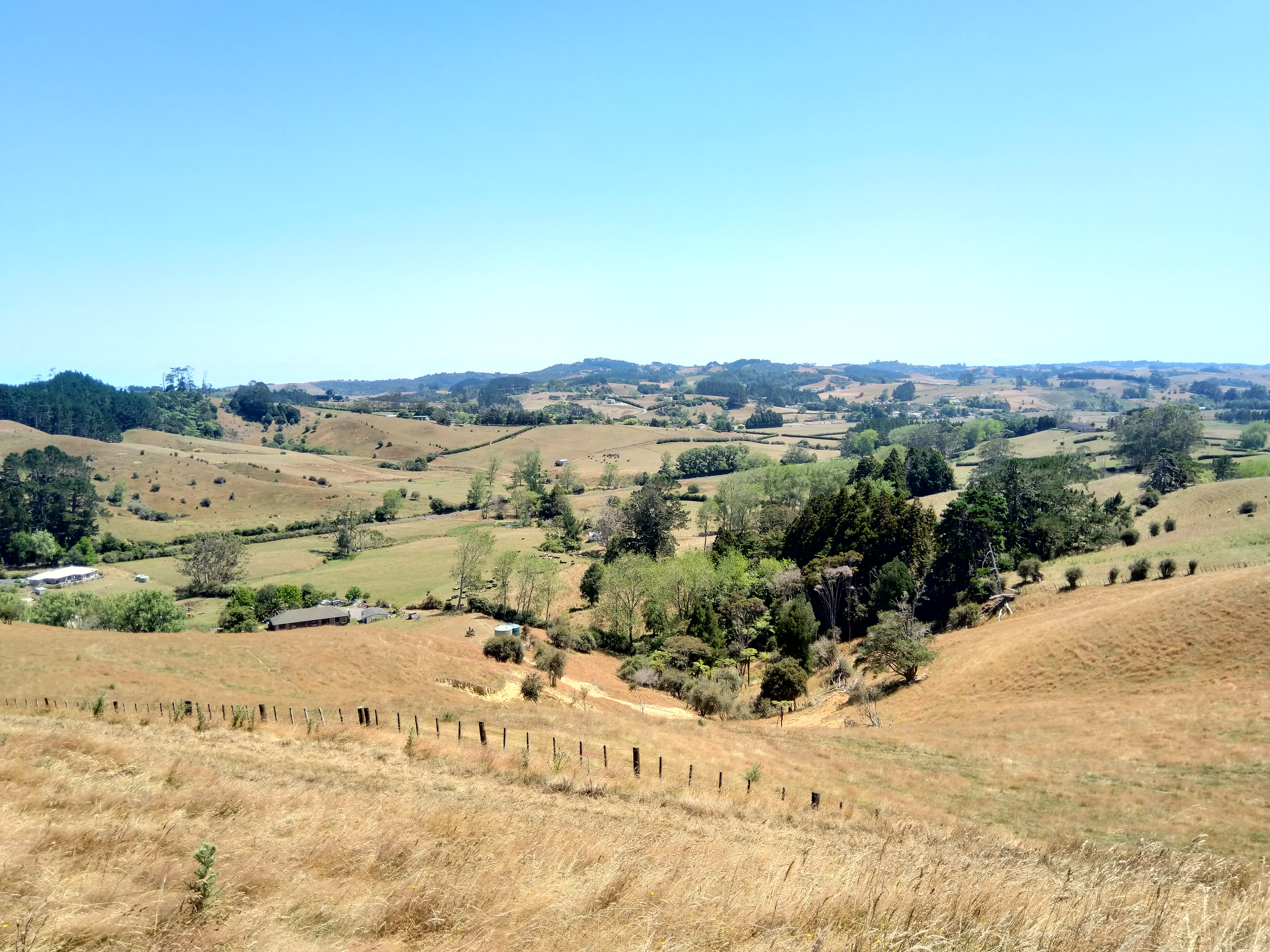
Farmland in Ararimu Valley

Ararimu is a locality in Auckland, New Zealand. It is in the Franklin ward of Auckland Council.

== History ==
At the time of European settlement, Ararimu was densely covered with native trees. A dispute over rights to take kauri gum was settled in 1857 in favour of Ngāti Whātua. The land was taken by the government under the New Zealand Settlements Act of 1863 and divided into blocks of about 280 hectares (700 acres). Lots were auctioned in 1867, and three pioneers made purchases: J Dunn, Laughlan Keaney and John Markham. These three families remained in Ararimu for many decades, with the last descendants of the Dunn family leaving in 1985.

In 1871, residents petitioned for roads to improve access to their farms. £100 was allocated to the building of a road between Ararimu and Maketu (Ramarama) at the end of 1873. and the road was built using volunteer labour the following year. About ten years later, the road was metalled. This road, now called Pratts Road, was steep and twisting but gradually improved with cuttings and deviations. It is still gravel as of 2020. The present Ararimu Road replaced it in 1925 and was much easier to travel on, although it was not sealed until the 1970s. Totara Road was formed after 1933 and gave access to Bombay. Gelling Road connected Ararimu to Hūnua after the Second World War, but it remained gravel at least into the 1980s.

A dispute between neighbours escalated into murder in December 1876, with Martin Curtin killing Denis Shanaghan. It seems likely that Curtin was mentally ill. His trial started only five days later, and he was found guilty and sentenced to death. He was hanged the following February.

The New Zealand Dairy Association operated a creamery from 1892 to 1917. This had the effect of increased wear on the roads as individual farmers took their produce to the creamery when previously a single wagon collected the produce to take to Auckland. Home separation of cream was used after 1917.

Although a post office operated from several individuals houses earlier, the first official Post Office opened at Ararimu in 1888. It closed about 1931, with rural delivery taking its place. A telephone and telegraph office opened in 1891, but about 1928 it was replaced by telephones installed in individual homes. In 1928 or 1929, electricity was supplied to the area for the first time.

A local newspaper, The Ararimu Courier, was produced from 1962, consisting at first of one or two sheets run off on a Gestetner at the school, and produced twice a month. The circulation reached 50 in the early 1970s, and the number of pages increased. About 1990 the production changed to photocopying, and from 2001, it was professionally printed in Manukau. The circulation reached 210 by 2016.

Lifestyle blocks first appeared at Ararimu in the mid-1970s. By 2016, they were the most common form of land use. The blocks increased the tree and bush cover of the area, resulting in an increase of bird life and reduction of erosion.

The Auckland Regional Authority proposed in 1986 to build a dam on the Mangawheau Stream to supply water for Auckland. The dam would have created a lake of 130 hectares in the Sinclair Road area which would have affected about 100 farms. Residents held a public meeting and formed an action group called Riverwatch to lobby against the dam. While the group could not convince the ARA against the dam, a water conservation campaign in the city reduced the need for a new water supply, and in 2002 a pipeline from the Waikato River solved the problem until 2020.

== Demographics ==
Ararimu statistical area covers 90.93 km^{2} (35.11 sq mi) and had an estimated population of 2,250 as of June 2025, with a population density of 25 people per km^{2}.

Historical population
Year	Pop.	±% p.a.
2006	1,689	—
2013	1,836	+1.20%
2018	2,124	+2.96%
2023	2,235	+1.02%

Ararimu had a population of 2,235 in the 2023 New Zealand census, an increase of 111 people (5.2%) since the 2018 census, and an increase of 399 people (21.7%) since the 2013 census. There were 1,119 males, 1,110 females and 3 people of other genders in 741 dwellings. 1.9% of people identified as LGBTIQ+. The median age was 43.3 years (compared with 38.1 years nationally). There were 456 people (20.4%) aged under 15 years, 324 (14.5%) aged 15 to 29, 1,185 (53.0%) aged 30 to 64, and 264 (11.8%) aged 65 or older.

People could identify as more than one ethnicity. The results were 90.3% European (Pākehā); 11.0% Māori; 3.2% Pasifika; 5.9% Asian; 0.9% Middle Eastern, Latin American and African New Zealanders (MELAA); and 3.8% other, which includes people giving their ethnicity as "New Zealander". English was spoken by 97.9%, Māori language by 1.1%, Samoan by 0.1%, and other languages by 9.3%. No language could be spoken by 1.6% (e.g. too young to talk). New Zealand Sign Language was known by 0.3%. The percentage of people born overseas was 22.0, compared with 28.8% nationally.

Religious affiliations were 29.9% Christian, 0.9% Hindu, 0.3% Islam, 0.4% Māori religious beliefs, 0.1% Buddhist, 0.4% New Age, 0.3% Jewish, and 2.0% other religions. People who answered that they had no religion were 56.4%, and 9.4% of people did not answer the census question.

Of those at least 15 years old, 423 (23.8%) people had a bachelor's or higher degree, 1,002 (56.3%) had a post-high school certificate or diploma, and 351 (19.7%) people exclusively held high school qualifications. The median income was $53,100, compared with $41,500 nationally. 378 people (21.2%) earned over $100,000 compared to 12.1% nationally. The employment status of those at least 15 was that 1,017 (57.2%) people were employed full-time, 315 (17.7%) were part-time, and 30 (1.7%) were unemployed.

== Education ==
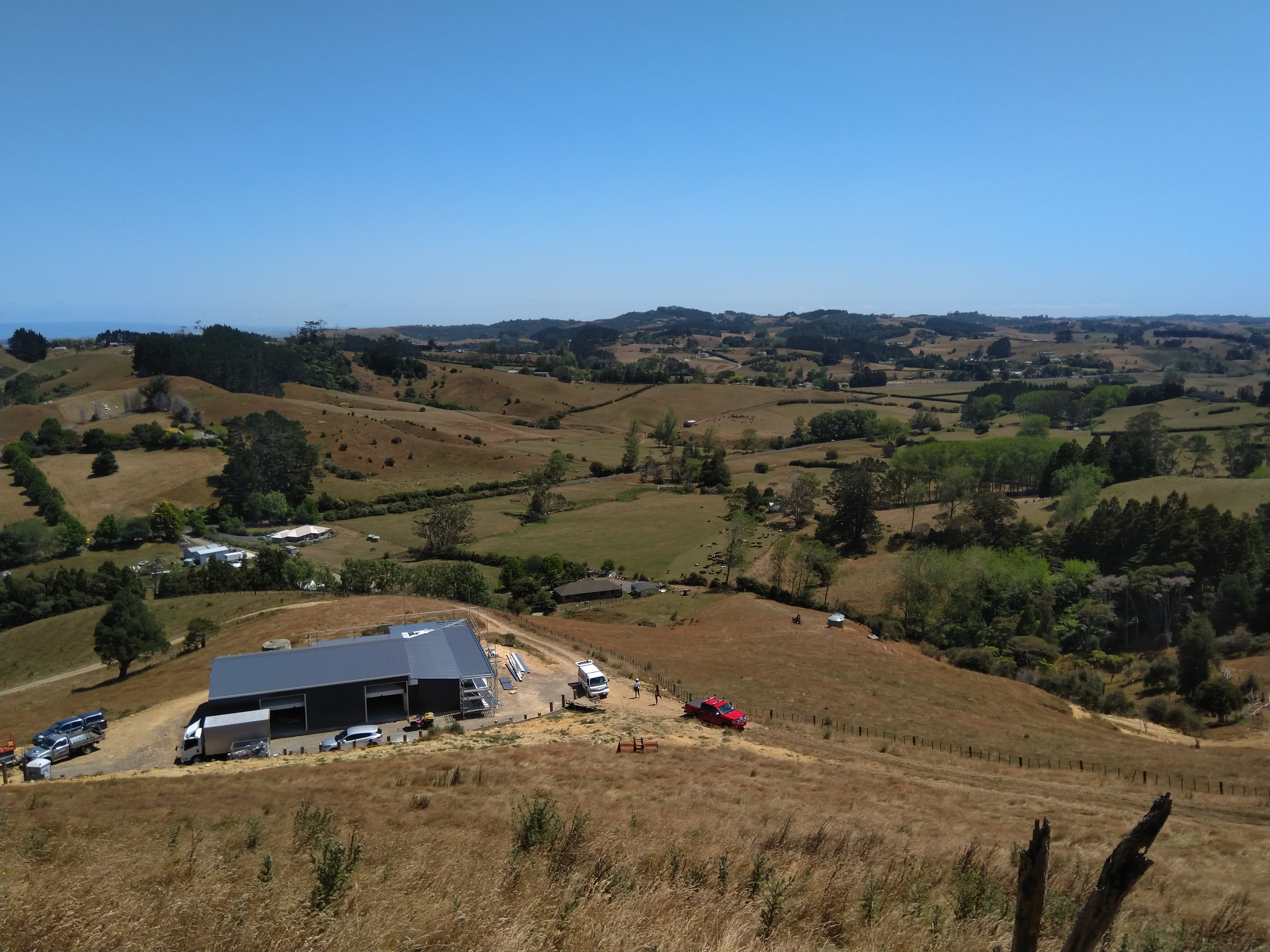
Farmland and farm buildings in Ararimu Valley

Ararimu School is a full primary school (years 1–8) with a roll of 104. The school website says it was established in 1867.

There were classes held at a Catholic chapel in 1975 or 1876, and later at the Lynch Home. The Valley School was built in 1876 on donated land with costs and labour met by the community. To serve the population of the upper Ararimu valley, a second school opened in 1883, but the original school closed in 1890. There was some ill-feeling in the community about this closure, and some families sent their children to Paparata School, even though Upper Ararimu School was closer. Upper Ararimu school dropped from two teachers to one in the early twentieth century, and shared a teacher on occasions with either Paparimu or Hunua South schools. After a community meeting in 1920, where upper valley residents were late to arrive, a motion was passed to move the school back to the middle valley. The school was moved piece-by-piece in 1922.

The school acquired a swimming pool in 1954. Prior to this, swimming was taught at a pool formed by a dam on Dunn's Creek just up the road. The pool was replaced in 1985.

The school building was used for public meetings, dances and socials until Ararimu Hall was built across the road in 1957. The building was divided into two classrooms by a curtain, and later by a wooden partition. In 1964 a second building was added, and the partition removed. The original building was replaced in 1981, and new classrooms were added, with nine classrooms operating in 2017.

Paparimu School is a full primary school (years 1–8) with a roll of 36. It opened in 1899. Paparimu School is about 8 km east of Ararimu School.

Both schools are coeducational. Rolls are as of July 2026.

== Bibliography ==
- McDonald, George, ed. (1967). They Chose This Valley: Ararimu Centennial 1867–1967. Ararimu Centennial Committee.
- Milne, J. (1983). The Valley School: A History of Ararimu School 1883–1983. Ararimu Centennial School Committee.
- Reid, Toni, ed. (2017). Our Path through the Rimu: a history of the Ararimu community 1867-2017. Ararimu Residents & Ratepayers Association Inc. ISBN 9780473385613.
