= Panmure District School =

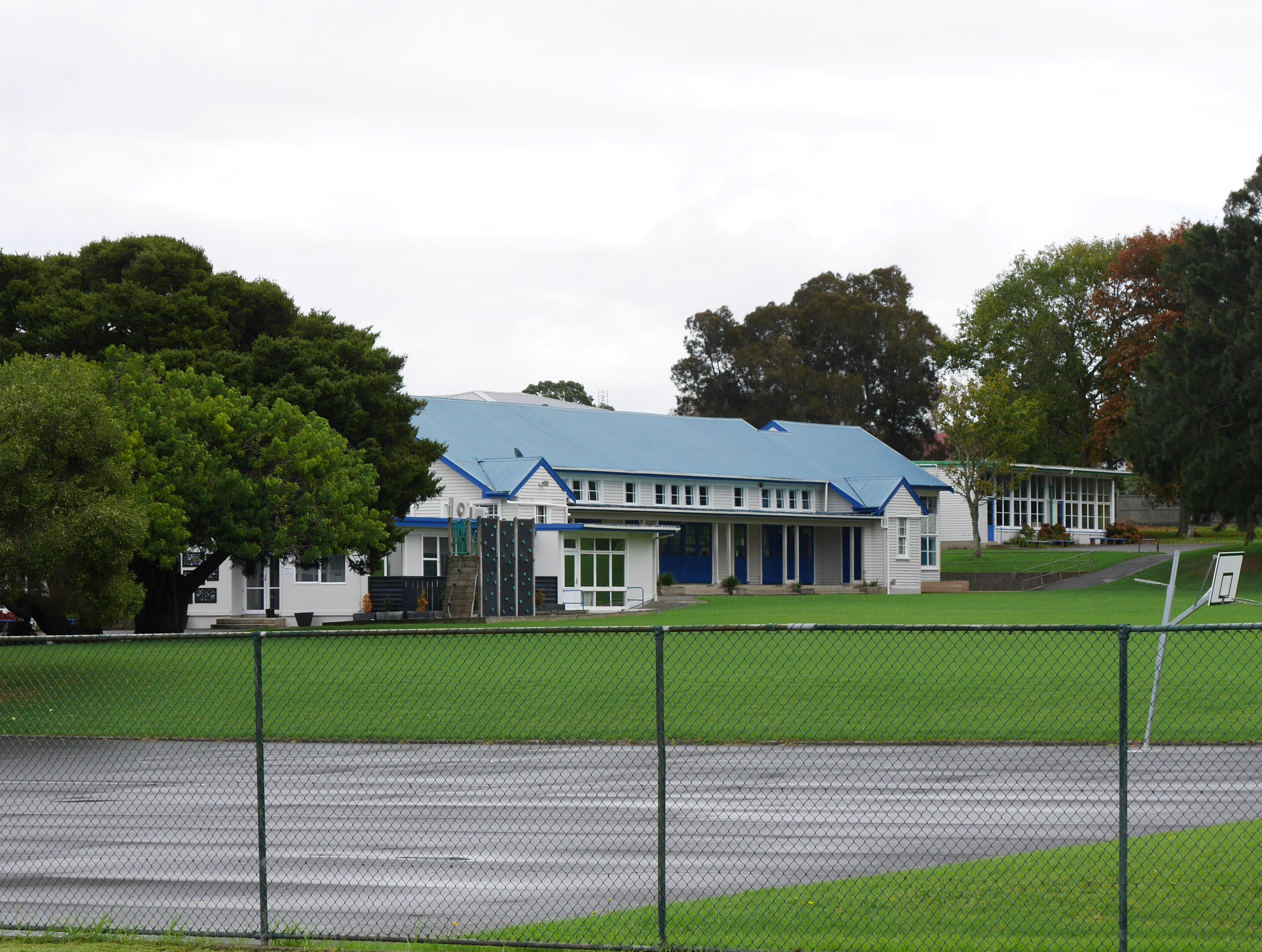

Location
- 87 Mt Wellington Highway, Panmure, Auckland, New Zealand; 36.9013°S 174.8418°E

Information
- Type: State Co-educational Primary (Year 0-8)
- Motto: They who endure conquer
- Established: August 13, 1875
- Ministry of Education Institution no.: 1420
- Principal: Rebekah Watts
- Enrolment: 168 (July 2026)
- Socio-economic decile: 3
- Website: http://panmure.school.nz/

Panmure District School is a primary school in the suburb of Panmure, New Zealand.

The school is located on Mt. Wellington Highway, in the view of Maungarei / Mount Wellington.

It is the oldest school in the Panmure area.
