= Waikowhai Intermediate School =

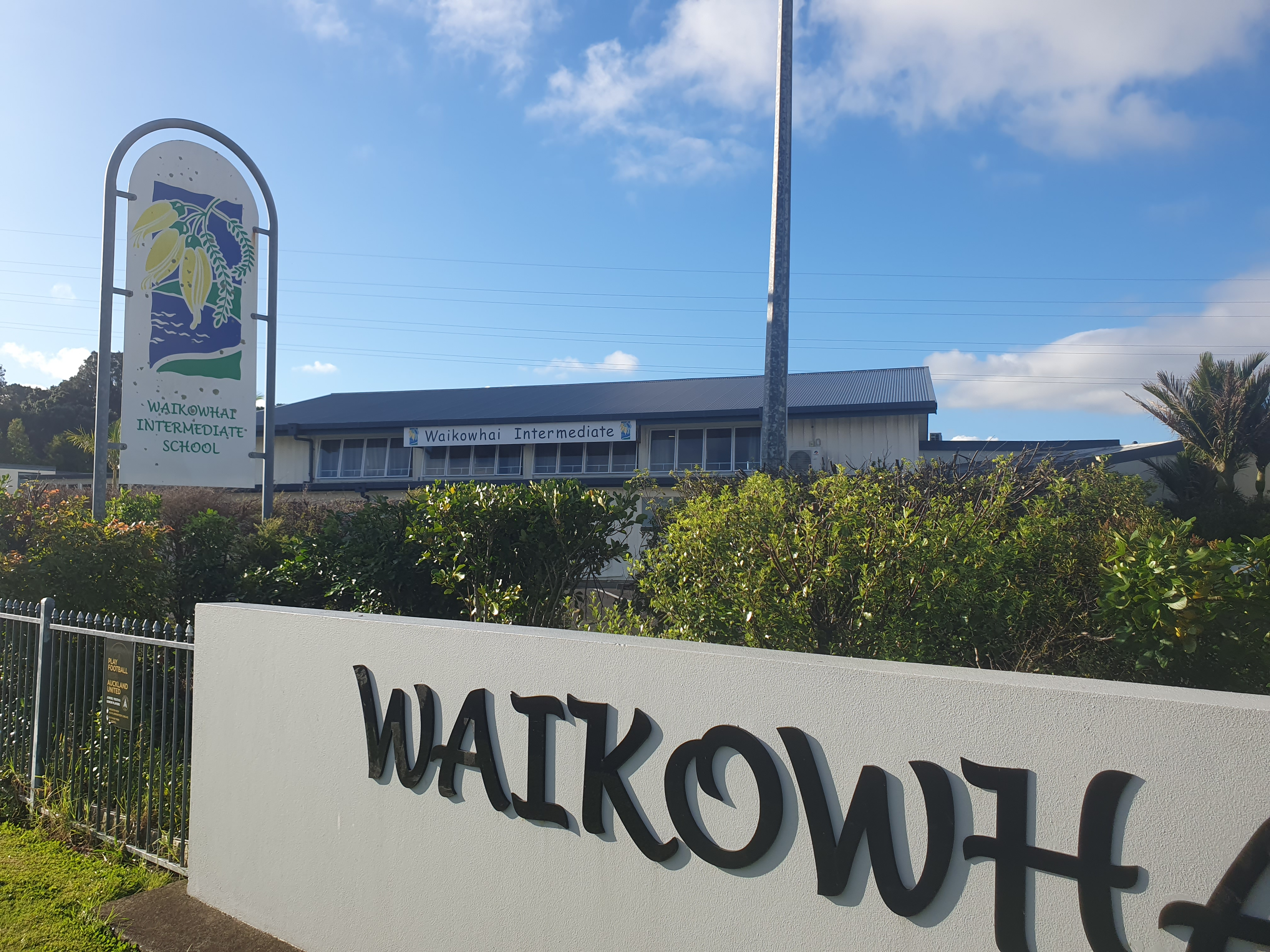

Location
- 650 Richardson Road, Mt Roskill, Auckland, New Zealand; 36.922940°S 174.742873°E

Information
- Type: State, Co-Educational, Intermediate
- Motto: ...developing life-long learners...
- Established: 1967
- Ministry of Education Institution no.: 1548
- Principal: David King
- Enrolment: 339 (July 2026)
- Socio-economic decile: 6
- Website: www.wai-int.school.nz

Waikowhai Intermediate School is a coeducational intermediate (Years 7 to 8) school located in Mount Roskill, Auckland, New Zealand. It serves the areas of Mount Roskill, Waikōwhai, Lynfield, Māngere Bridge and Blockhouse Bay. The current principal is David King.

== History ==
Waikowhai Intermediate School began as a temporary hostel for the North Shore Teachers' Training College in 1964. After a permanent hostel was built on the North Shore, the site was redeveloped as an intermediate school, which was opened in March 1967.

In 2015, the school became a part of the Lynfield community of schools. The 50th reunion was meant to take place on Saturday, 16 September 2017 but due to the amount of registrations the reunion was cancelled.

From 2020, the Mountains to Sea Conservation Trust began running a programme for Waikowhai Intermediate students to experience and learn about the Marine reserves of New Zealand.

== Facilities ==
The school's educational opportunities for year 7 and 8 include interactive whiteboards and 1-to-1 Chromebooks in all classrooms. There are also multiple facilities including a science room, modern technology workshop, art room, performing arts suite and a food technology room with 8 separate self-functioning stations which can cater for 32 students if need be.

== Notable alumni ==
- Jennie Kim, a member of K-pop girl group Blackpink.
