= Kia Aroha College =

Location
- 51 Othello Drive; Otara; Auckland; 36.9807826°S 174.8921788°E

Information
- Type: State, Co-educational, composite, Designated Special Character school
- Established: 2011
- Ministry of Education Institution no.: 631
- Principal: Haley Milne
- Enrolment: 319 (July 2026)
- Website: kiaaroha.school.nz

Kia Aroha College is a co-educational composite school in the South Auckland suburb of Clover Park, New Zealand, catering for students from Year 1 to Year 13. The school opened in 1981 as Clover Park Intermediate School, later becoming a middle school and in 2011, merged with Te Whānau o Tupuranga to become Kia Aroha College. There are two bilingual streams within the school: Te Whānau o Tupuranga, which offers bilingual courses for high school students in Māori, and the Fanau Pasifika section, which offers bilingual education in Samoan and Tongan.

== History ==
The school opened in 1981 as Clover Park Intermediate School, a two-year intermediate school for year 7 and 8 students. The school was the first English/Māori bilingual intermediate school in New Zealand. In 1995 after lobbying from parents who wanted students to continue to benefit from the whānau (extended family) environment of the school, the school became Clover Park Middle School, offering classes to year 9 and 10 students.

In 2006, Te Whānau o Tupuranga was established as a stand-alone bilingual year 7-12 high school, sharing a campus with Clover Park Middle School. For many years, Pasifika students enrolled at the school to continue their studies, and to ensure they kept ties with the school's learning environment. In 2010, Te Whānau o Tupuranga won two awards for its campus at the New Zealand Institute of Landscape Architects awards.

In 2011, the Minister of Education approved a plan to merge Clover Park Middle School and Te Whānau o Tupuranga, resulting in the creation of Kia Aroha College. Te Whānau o Tupuranga retained its name and identity within Kia Aroha College, and was joined by Fanau Pasifika, a centre for Samoan and Tongan language bilingual high school education. The name Kia Aroha was originally the school motto of Clover Park Intermediate School, and was later chosen as the name of the marae located at the school in 1998.

In 2021, the school received approval to become a composite school, providing courses for students aged between year 1 and year 6. This began with a Māori bilingual unit in 2023, followed by a Pasifika bilingual unit in 2024.

== Learning environment ==
The school's aim is to provide a learning environment where Māori and Pasifika cultural identities are the norm, including the adherence to Māori and Pasifika cultural customs and bilingual classrooms, and the involvement of extended families in the school's learning community. The school intends to develop students as "warrior scholars", which the school describes as youth who are secure in their cultural identity and are critical agents for social justice and change. Learning is based on the Youth Participatory Action Research (YPAR) model, which is inquiry-based, with minimal whole class teacher-directed study. Each class has three teachers who teach an integrated curriculum, as opposed to teachers focusing on separate subjects. The school's assessments are focused on internal assessments, and students do not take external exams.

== Enrolment ==
As of July 2026, Kia Aroha College has a roll of 319 students, of which 210 (65.8%) identify as Māori.

As of 2026, the school has an Equity Index of 539, placing it amongst schools whose students have the most socioeconomic barriers to achievement (roughly equivalent to deciles 1 and 2 under the former socio-economic decile system).
