= Kohimarama School =

Coordinates: 36.85480°S 174.83704°E

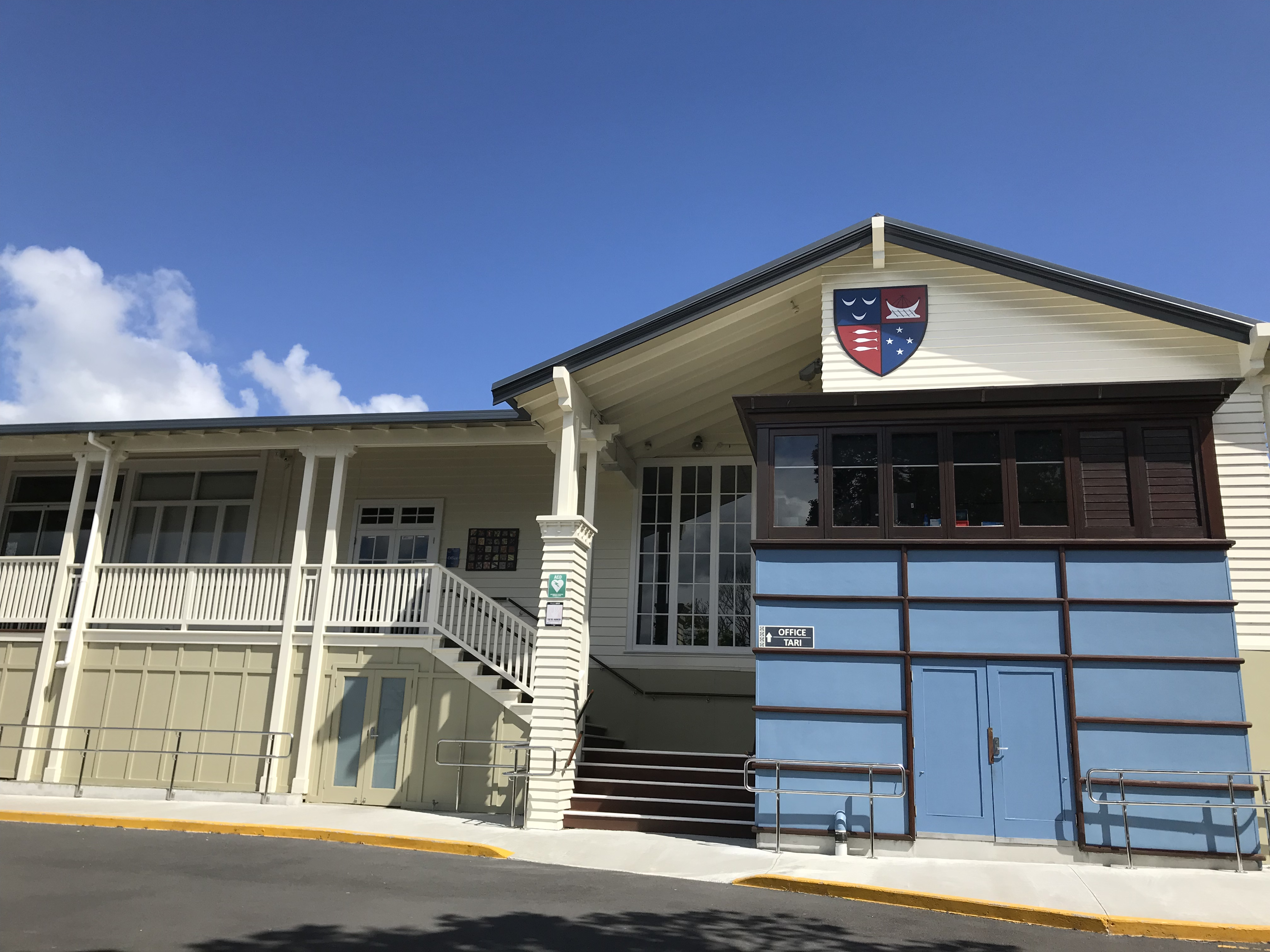

Location
- 112 Kohimarama Road; Kohimarama; Auckland 1071; New Zealand

Information
- Type: State, Co-educational, Primary
- Motto: Enter to Learn, Leave to Serve
- Established: 1921
- Ministry of Education Institution no.: 1334
- Principal: Paul Engles
- Enrolment: 476 (as of July 2026)
- Socio-economic decile: 10

Kohimarama School is a coeducational state primary school in Kohimarama, Auckland. The initial school building was constructed in 1921, while the school grounds were opened on 6 September 1924. The memorial entrance gates to the school were opened on 14 June 1928 by the then chairman of Auckland Education Board, A. Burns. The school's flagpole and bell were from the scow 'Kohi'.
