= Pukekohe Intermediate School =

Location
- Queen Street, Pukekohe, Auckland; 37.2031°S 174.9020°E

Information
- Type: Intermediate (Year 7–8)
- Motto: Aim High
- Ministry of Education Institution no.: 1452
- Principal: Rebekah Pearson
- Enrolment: 612
- Socio-economic decile: 6
- Website: www.pukekoheint.school.nz

Pukekohe Intermediate School is a New Zealand intermediate school located in the rural community of Pukekohe, Auckland. It primarily receives students from Pukekohe Hill, Pukekohe Valley, Pukekohe East, Puni, Mauku and Patumahoe primary schools.
