= Remuera Intermediate School =

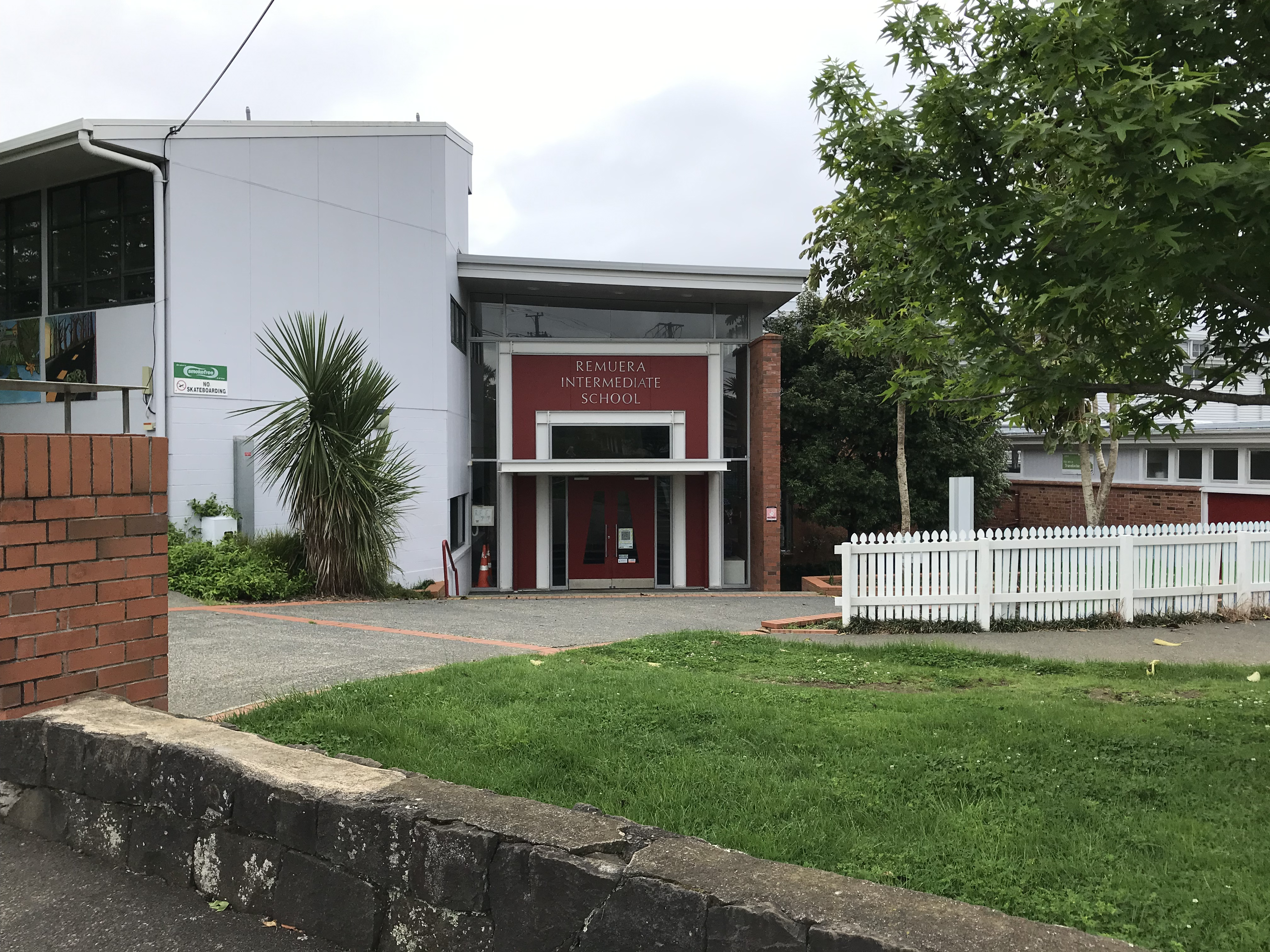

Location
- Ascot Avenue, Remuera, Auckland; New Zealand; 36.8859°S 174.7999°E

Information
- Type: State coed intermediate, years 7–8
- Motto: Reliability, Integrity, Service
- Established: 1954
- Ministry of Education Institution no.: 1461
- Principal: Kyle Brewerton
- Enrolment: 887 (July 2026)
- Socio-economic decile: 8
- Website: www.remint.school.nz

Remuera Intermediate School (R.I) is a school catering for 11 to 13 year olds in Remuera, Auckland, New Zealand. It was founded in 1954. The current principal of the school is Kyle Brewerton. The school's current student count consists of 867 students, however the roll number varies between 850 and 1000 each year.

== See also ==
- List of schools in the Auckland region
