= Wainui =

- Interactive map of Wainui
- Coordinates: 36°36′3″S 174°35′31″E
- Country: New Zealand
- Region: Auckland Region
- Ward: Rodney ward
- Local board: Rodney Local Board
- Subdivision: Dairy Flat subdivision
- Electorates: Kaipara ki Mahurangi; Te Tai Tokerau

Government
  - Territorial authority: Auckland Council
  - Mayor of Auckland: Wayne Brown
  - Kaipara ki Mahurangi MP: Chris Penk
  - Te Tai Tokerau MP: Mariameno Kapa-Kingi

Makarau	Tahekeroa	Waiwera
	Wainui	Silverdale
Waitoki

Wainui is a locality in the Rodney Ward of the Auckland Region of New Zealand. It is 5 kilometres (3.1 mi) north-east of Waitoki and 10 kilometres (6.2 mi) west of Orewa. The Wainui Stream flows south-west through the area and into the Kaukapakapa River.

== Etymology ==
Wainui is Māori for 'big river'.

The earliest recorded name for the area is Parakakau, which referred to the inland forested areas of the upper Weiti River during the mid-19th Century. The locality was named after the Wainui Creek, a tributary of the Waiwera River geographically distant from Wainui township, located to the northeast along Weranui Road.

== History ==
The area was settled soon after the Mahurangi purchase by the Crown in 1841. By the mid-19th century, kauri gum diggers often frequented the area. Wainui was settled by people from England, Scotland and Ireland around 1850, including the Hutson, Thick, King, Lloyd and Jacobs families. Early settlers to the area were met with mānuka and fern scrubland and kauri forest, and made a living by timber milling and kauri gum digging. From around the year 1860, families began clearing land for agriculture. New Zealand explorer Charles Heaphy owned much of the land at Wainui, selling 104 acres (42 ha) to brickmaker William Lamont in 1862.

In 1867, the Wainui Presbyterian Church was built, was the first public building constructed at Wainui. It quickly becoming the social hub of the Wainui community. School lessons began informally in homes around the year 1860, and Wainui School was constructed in 1879. In 1894, cartoonist Trevor Lloyd married Lamont's daughter Emily at the church.

The Wainui Road District was formed 14 April 1870. In 1883 the area was transferred from Rodney County to Waitemata County. In 1892 the road district was dissolved.

Wainui was originally a rural farming area. During the 1960s the Waitemata County Council allowed for land to be subdivided into lifestyle blocks.

== Demographics ==
Wainui-Waiwera statistical area, which includes Waiwera, covers 62.24 km^{2} (24.03 sq mi) and had an estimated population of 1,780 as of June 2025, with a population density of 29 people per km^{2}.

Historical population
Year	Pop.	±% p.a.
2006	1,326	—
2013	1,323	−0.03%
2018	1,557	+3.31%
2023	1,686	+1.60%
The 2006 population is for a larger area of 78.72 km^{2}. Source:

Wainui-Waiwera had a population of 1,686 in the 2023 New Zealand census, an increase of 129 people (8.3%) since the 2018 census, and an increase of 363 people (27.4%) since the 2013 census. There were 828 males, 852 females and 6 people of other genders in 621 dwellings. 1.8% of people identified as LGBTIQ+. The median age was 48.7 years (compared with 38.1 years nationally). There were 246 people (14.6%) aged under 15 years, 279 (16.5%) aged 15 to 29, 816 (48.4%) aged 30 to 64, and 348 (20.6%) aged 65 or older.

People could identify as more than one ethnicity. The results were 92.5% European (Pākehā); 9.4% Māori; 1.6% Pasifika; 4.1% Asian; 0.4% Middle Eastern, Latin American and African New Zealanders (MELAA); and 3.4% other, which includes people giving their ethnicity as "New Zealander". English was spoken by 98.0%, Māori language by 1.4%, Samoan by 0.4%, and other languages by 10.0%. No language could be spoken by 1.4% (e.g. too young to talk). New Zealand Sign Language was known by 0.2%. The percentage of people born overseas was 24.6, compared with 28.8% nationally.

Religious affiliations were 33.5% Christian, 0.2% Hindu, 0.4% Islam, 0.2% Māori religious beliefs, 0.9% Buddhist, 0.7% New Age, 0.2% Jewish, and 1.4% other religions. People who answered that they had no religion were 58.0%, and 5.3% of people did not answer the census question.

Of those at least 15 years old, 291 (20.2%) people had a bachelor's or higher degree, 786 (54.6%) had a post-high school certificate or diploma, and 276 (19.2%) people exclusively held high school qualifications. The median income was $44,100, compared with $41,500 nationally. 243 people (16.9%) earned over $100,000 compared to 12.1% nationally. The employment status of those at least 15 was that 720 (50.0%) people were employed full-time, 243 (16.9%) were part-time, and 18 (1.2%) were unemployed.

== Education ==
Wainui School is a coeducational full primary (years 1–8) school with a roll of 285 students as of October 2025. The school opened in 1879 and celebrated its 125th anniversary in 2004.
