= Waikōwhai =

- Suburb
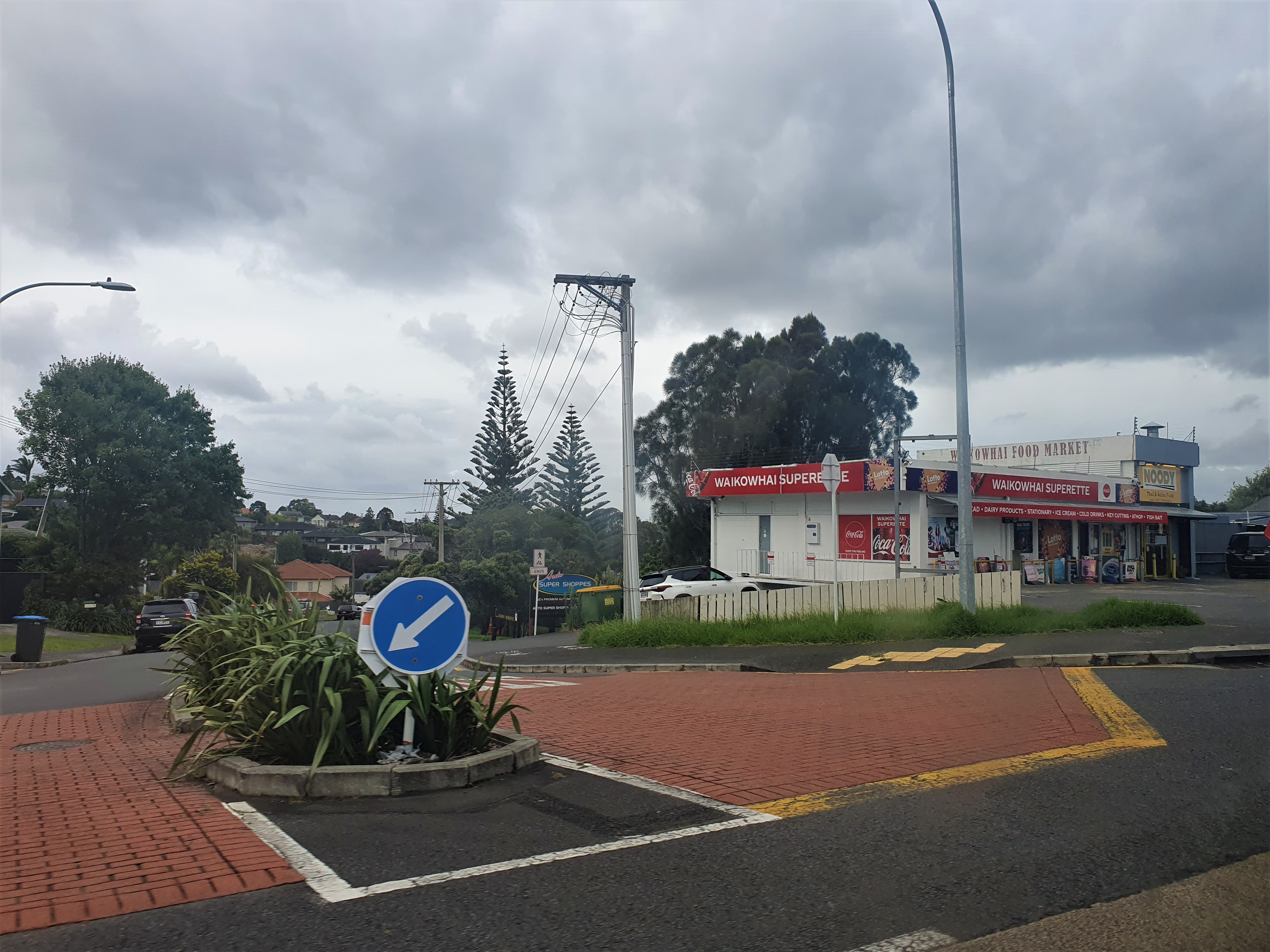
- Waikowhai Superette on Hillsborough Road
- Interactive map of Waikōwhai
- Coordinates: 36.931°S 174.737°E
- Country: New Zealand
- City: Auckland
- Local authority: Auckland Council
- Electoral ward: Albert-Eden-Puketāpapa ward
- Local board: Puketāpapa Local Board

Area
  - Land: 136 ha (340 acres)

Population (June 2025)
  - Total: 2,200
  - Density: 1,600/km^{2} (4,200/sq mi)

New Windsor (3.6 km)	Mount Roskill (1,259 m)	Three Kings (2.9 km)
Lynfield (1.7 km)	Waikōwhai	Hillsborough (1327 m)
(Manukau Harbour)	(Manukau Harbour)	(Manukau Harbour)

Waikōwhai is an Auckland suburb, under the local governance of the Auckland Council. Waikōwhai has the largest block of native forest left on the Auckland isthmus. The block was considered too infertile for farming and subsequently not cleared but given to the Wesley Mission. Today the forest block hosts a valuable sample of Auckland's original fauna and flora. Waikōwhai Walkway extends for 10 km (6.2 mi) linking Onehunga to Lynfield Cove.

== Etymology ==
The name Waikōwhai (sometimes spelt Waikowai) is mentioned on early European maps of the area and in newspapers from the 1850s. The meaning of the name in Māori is unclear, either meaning kōwhai tree waters, or yellow water.

== History ==
The southern Auckland isthmus has been settled by Tāmaki Māori since at least the 13th century. A traditional trail existed at Waikōwhai, linking Te Tōanga Waka (the Whau River portage) in the west to Onehunga in the east. The iwi and hapū of the Manukau Harbour moved seasonally between different areas, collecting seasonal resources and farming. By the early 18th century, the area was within the rohe of Waiohua. After the defeat of Kiwi Tāmaki, the paramount chief of the iwi, the area became part of the rohe of Ngāti Whātua (modern-day Ngāti Whātua Ōrākei). There are two known sites of significance in the Waikōwhai area, that are recorded on the 1853 map of the Manukau Harbour by Commander B. Drury: the Cape Horn headland is the recorded location of a fortified pā called Matengarahi, and the modern day Wattle Bay area, a site where many shell middens have been found, was called Taunahi.

The land at Waikōwhai was purchased through Robert FitzRoy's pre-emptive waiver scheme on 26 March 1844, as a part of Deed 208. Most of the modern suburb of Waikōwhai was land gifted to the Wesleyan Methodist Church by the Crown in 1850, for the use of the Wesleyan mission. The land was used by the mission for fishing and swimming by the pupils.

Waikōwhai Bay was a popular destination for swimmers, day-trippers and picnickers in Auckland during the early 20th century. Gradually the bay lost popularity in the 1930s, due to increased pollution in the Manukau Harbour.

In 1927, the Wesley Trust began developing and subdividing the land at Waikōwhai for suburban housing, which was followed by government housing developments from the 1940s onwards.

In the 1950s and 1960s, a rubbish tip and landfill was established at Waikōwhai Park, which negatively impacted the area; causing pollution and blocking access to Waikōwhai Bay.

== Demographics ==
Waikōwhai covers 1.36 km^{2} (0.53 sq mi) and had an estimated population of 2,200 as of June 2025, with a population density of 1,618 people per km^{2}.

Historical population
Year	Pop.	±% p.a.
2006	4,833	—
2013	1,746	−13.54%
2018	2,037	+3.13%
2023	1,971	−0.66%
The 2006 population is for a larger area of 2.08 km^{2}. Source:

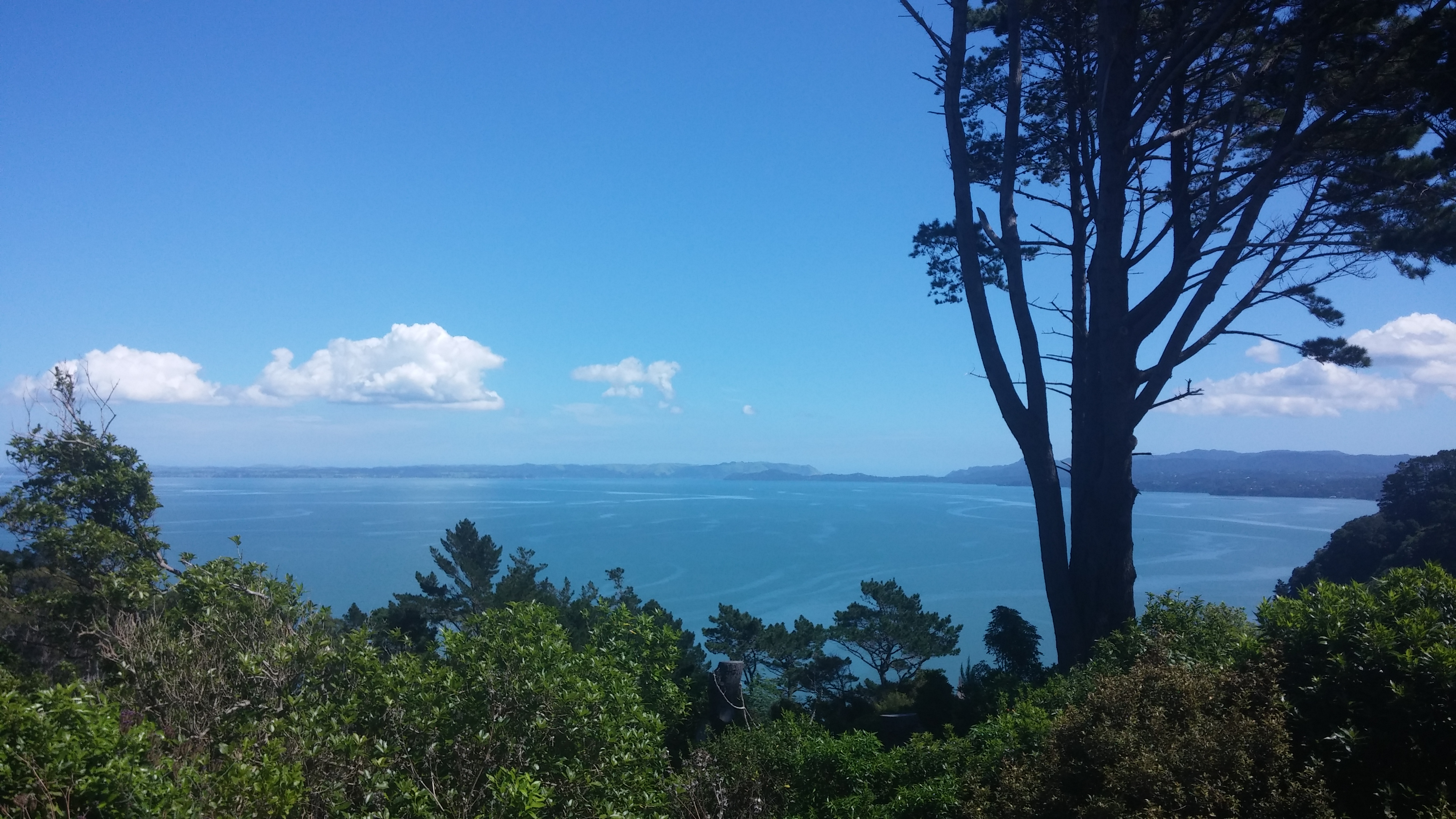
View of the Manukau Harbour from Waikōwhai

Waikōwhai had a population of 1,971 in the 2023 New Zealand census, a decrease of 66 people (−3.2%) since the 2018 census, and an increase of 225 people (12.9%) since the 2013 census. There were 1,017 males, 948 females and 6 people of other genders in 621 dwellings. 3.3% of people identified as LGBTIQ+. The median age was 37.4 years (compared with 38.1 years nationally). There were 288 people (14.6%) aged under 15 years, 426 (21.6%) aged 15 to 29, 981 (49.8%) aged 30 to 64, and 273 (13.9%) aged 65 or older.

People could identify as more than one ethnicity. The results were 36.5% European (Pākehā); 4.4% Māori; 9.1% Pasifika; 54.3% Asian; 4.3% Middle Eastern, Latin American and African New Zealanders (MELAA); and 1.2% other, which includes people giving their ethnicity as "New Zealander". English was spoken by 92.2%, Māori language by 0.6%, Samoan by 2.3%, and other languages by 40.8%. No language could be spoken by 2.3% (e.g. too young to talk). New Zealand Sign Language was known by 0.6%. The percentage of people born overseas was 54.6, compared with 28.8% nationally.

Religious affiliations were 30.6% Christian, 16.9% Hindu, 8.4% Islam, 0.2% Māori religious beliefs, 2.1% Buddhist, 0.2% Jewish, and 2.6% other religions. People who answered that they had no religion were 33.0%, and 6.2% of people did not answer the census question.

Of those at least 15 years old, 729 (43.3%) people had a bachelor's or higher degree, 603 (35.8%) had a post-high school certificate or diploma, and 354 (21.0%) people exclusively held high school qualifications. The median income was $54,800, compared with $41,500 nationally. 300 people (17.8%) earned over $100,000 compared to 12.1% nationally. The employment status of those at least 15 was that 990 (58.8%) people were employed full-time, 213 (12.7%) were part-time, and 42 (2.5%) were unemployed.

== Landmarks and features ==
- The Arkell Homestead, a historic country homestead owned by the Arkell family at 461 Hillsborough Road. The homestead was used as a home for the Sisters of the Good Shepherd, St Joseph, and is now a part of the Metlifecare Retirement Village.
- Waikōwhai Park, a large park bordering the Manukau Harbour, which was created on land gifted by the Wesleyan Mission Trust to the Mt Roskill Road Board in 1909. The park opened in February 1914, and became a popular destination for swimming, camping and picnics in the early 20th century. The park is dominated by kohekohe forest.
- The Waikōwhai Walkway, a 10 km (6.2 mi) path linking Onehunga to Lynfield Cove.
- The northern Manukau Harbour coast, including Cape Horn, Waikōwhai Bay, Faulkner Bay and Wesley Bay. Cape Horn features a lookout over the Manukau Harbour.

== Education ==
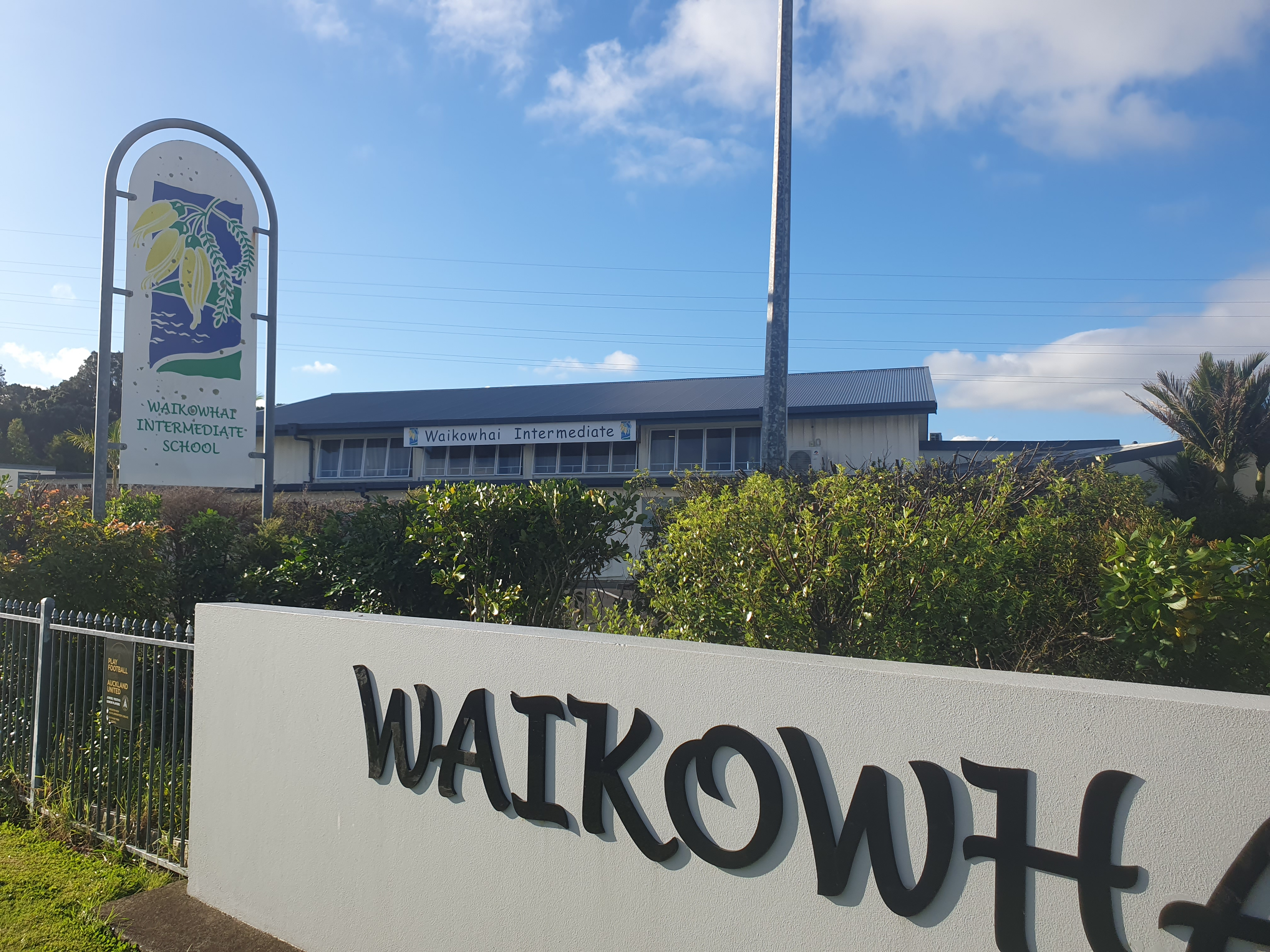
Waikowhai Intermediate School

Waikowhai Intermediate School is an intermediate school (years 7–8) with a roll of 337. It opened in 1964, and was originally used as a campus for the North Shore Teachers Training College.

Waikowhai School is a contributing primary school (years 1–6) with a roll of 189, which opened in 1956.

Both schools are coeducational. Rolls are as of March 2026.

Secondary schools in the area are Lynfield College and Mount Roskill Grammar School. Catholic secondary schools serving the area are Marcellin College and St Peter's College.

== Bibliography ==
- Reidy, Jade (2013). Not Just Passing Through: the Making of Mt Roskill. Puketapapa Local Board. ISBN 978-1-927216-97-2.
