= Manurewa East School =

Location
- Scotts Road, Manurewa, Auckland; 37.0220°S 174.9087°E

Information
- Type: State Co-Ed Contributing (Year 1-6 Years 7-8 dual language Te Reo Maaori)
- Motto: Māori: Whiti te Raa - Rise and shine
- Ministry of Education Institution no.: 1352
- Principal: Mary Takatainga
- Enrolment: 388 (July 2026)
- Socio-economic decile: 2
- Website: manurewaeast.school.nz

Manurewa East School is a primary school (years 1–6) in Manurewa, a suburb of Auckland, New Zealand.

== History ==
The school opened on 5 February 1962, opening with a roll of 182 pupils. The school started with four teachers, including Olive Wilson, who was the wife of the school's first principal, William Wilson.

== Principals ==
- 1999–2017 - Phil Palfrey
- 2017–Present - Mary Takatainga
