= Howick Intermediate School =

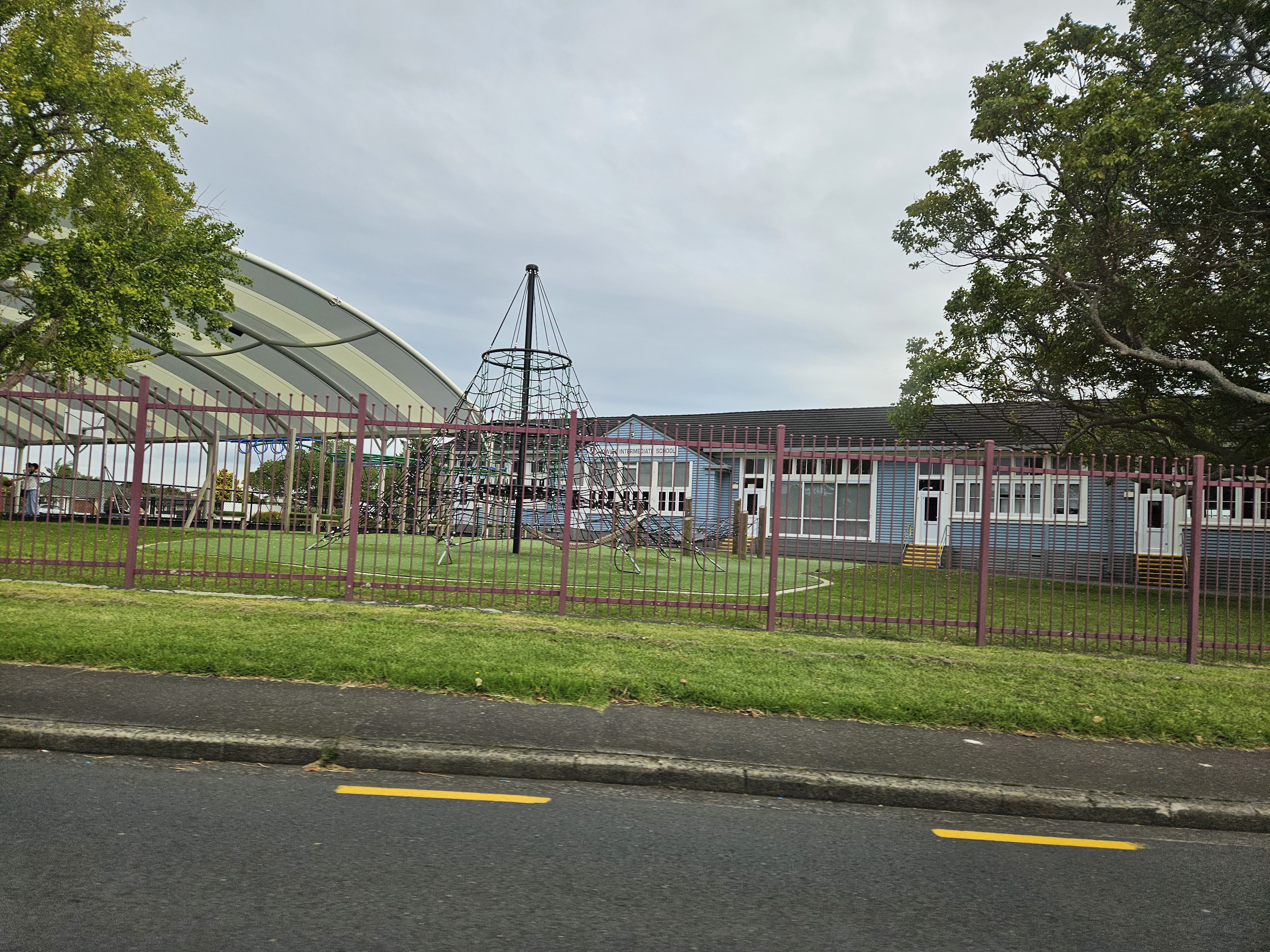

Location
- Botany Road, Howick, Auckland 2010, New Zealand; 36.8999°S 174.9177°E

Information
- Type: Co-educational Intermediate
- Motto: De Bon Voulour Servir (To Serve With Goodwill)
- Established: 1937
- Ministry of Education Institution no.: 1318
- Principal: Sara Pickering
- Enrolment: 605 (July 2026)
- Socio-economic decile: 5
- Website: www.howickint.school.nz

Howick Intermediate is a co-educational intermediate school located on the corner of Botany Road and Pakuranga Highway, in Auckland, New Zealand. Pupils attend for years seven and eight (form one and two).

The school was originally built in 1937 and opened as Howick District High School. It was primarily built as a closer school for the Royal New Zealand Fencible Corps, many of whose families had settled in the surrounding suburbs of south and south-east Auckland. In 1966 the school was re-established as Howick Intermediate School.

School facilities include a technology block, a swimming pool, a large field equipped with a fitness circuit, a library and information centre, and a school hall. The school hall facilities are utilized by numerous groups in the weekends.

In February 2000 two 11-year-old boys from Howick Intermediate drowned at a swimming hole in the Kauaeranga River while on a school camp.

In 2007, the school won a Mainstream Merit Award, an award offered by the New Zealand Government for recognition of successful placement and integration for employees with disabilities.

As of 2026, there are approximately 605-618 students in Years 7-8 in the school. There are currently 5 whānau (groups of students) in the school: Cooper, Mansfield, Hillary, Ngata, and Batten. They are named after notable New Zealanders.
