= Waitoki =

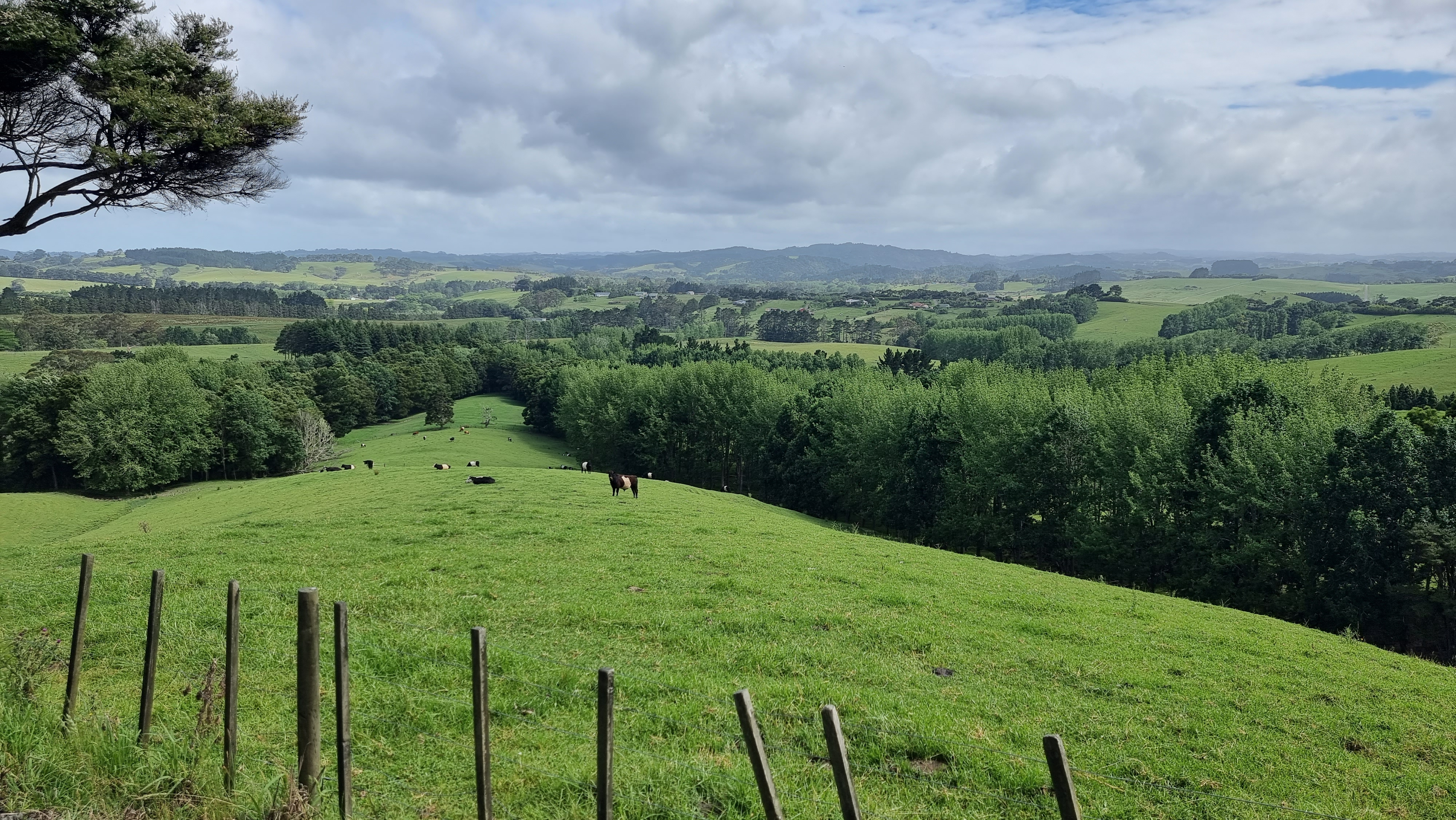
- Farmland near Waitoki in Northern Auckland Region
- Interactive map of Waitoki
- Coordinates: 36°38′5″S 174°33′5″E
- Country: New Zealand
- Region: Auckland Region
- Ward: Rodney ward
- Community board: Rodney Local Board
- Subdivision: Kumeū subdivision
- Electorates: Kaipara ki Mahurangi; Te Tai Tokerau

Government
  - Territorial Authority: Auckland Council
  - Mayor of Auckland: Wayne Brown
  - Kaipara ki Mahurangi MP: Chris Penk
  - Te Tai Tokerau MP: Mariameno Kapa-Kingi

Area
  - Total: 1.80 km^{2} (0.69 sq mi)

Population (2023 Census)
  - Total: 216
  - Density: 120/km^{2} (311/sq mi)

Waitoki is a locality in the Rodney District of New Zealand. Wainui is approximately 5.5 kilometres to the north-east, Kaukapakapa 6.5 km to the north-west, and Dairy Flat 10 km to the south-east. The Wainui Stream joins the Waitoki Stream just to the north-east of the locality. The stream flows west into the Kaukapakapa River.

== Demographics ==
Waitoki is centred on an SA1 statistical area which covers 1.80 km^{2} (0.69 sq mi). The SA1 area is part of the larger Waitoki statistical area.

Historical population for Waitoki settlement
Year	Pop.	±% p.a.
2013	180	—
2018	183	+0.33%
2023	216	+3.37%

The SA1 area had a population of 216 in the 2023 New Zealand census, an increase of 33 people (18.0%) since the 2018 census, and an increase of 36 people (20.0%) since the 2013 census. There were 117 males and 96 females in 72 dwellings. 1.4% of people identified as LGBTIQ+. The median age was 37.0 years (compared with 38.1 years nationally). There were 51 people (23.6%) aged under 15 years, 33 (15.3%) aged 15 to 29, 108 (50.0%) aged 30 to 64, and 24 (11.1%) aged 65 or older.

People could identify as more than one ethnicity. The results were 94.4% European (Pākehā), 4.2% Māori, 1.4% Pasifika, and 5.6% Asian. English was spoken by 95.8%, and other languages by 5.6%. No language could be spoken by 2.8% (e.g. too young to talk). The percentage of people born overseas was 20.8, compared with 28.8% nationally.

Religious affiliations were 25.0% Christian, and 1.4% other religions. People who answered that they had no religion were 66.7%, and 5.6% of people did not answer the census question.

Of those at least 15 years old, 24 (14.5%) people had a bachelor's or higher degree, 96 (58.2%) had a post-high school certificate or diploma, and 33 (20.0%) people exclusively held high school qualifications. The median income was $51,500, compared with $41,500 nationally. 30 people (18.2%) earned over $100,000 compared to 12.1% nationally. The employment status of those at least 15 was that 99 (60.0%) people were employed full-time and 30 (18.2%) were part-time.

=== Waitoki statistical area ===
Waitoki statistical area covers 40.75 km^{2} (15.73 sq mi) south and east of the settlement and had an estimated population of 1,790 as of June 2025, with a population density of 44 people per km^{2}.

Historical population for the statistical area
Year	Pop.	±% p.a.
2006	1,278	—
2013	1,320	+0.46%
2018	1,530	+3.00%
2023	1,698	+2.11%

Waitoki statistical area had a population of 1,698 in the 2023 New Zealand census, an increase of 168 people (11.0%) since the 2018 census, and an increase of 378 people (28.6%) since the 2013 census. There were 864 males, 828 females and 3 people of other genders in 537 dwellings. 2.3% of people identified as LGBTIQ+. The median age was 42.3 years (compared with 38.1 years nationally). There were 318 people (18.7%) aged under 15 years, 300 (17.7%) aged 15 to 29, 846 (49.8%) aged 30 to 64, and 234 (13.8%) aged 65 or older.

People could identify as more than one ethnicity. The results were 92.0% European (Pākehā); 7.1% Māori; 1.6% Pasifika; 5.5% Asian; 0.7% Middle Eastern, Latin American and African New Zealanders (MELAA); and 2.3% other, which includes people giving their ethnicity as "New Zealander". English was spoken by 97.9%, Māori language by 1.2%, Samoan by 0.2%, and other languages by 9.0%. No language could be spoken by 1.6% (e.g. too young to talk). New Zealand Sign Language was known by 0.2%. The percentage of people born overseas was 25.4, compared with 28.8% nationally.

Religious affiliations were 26.9% Christian, 0.2% Hindu, 0.4% Māori religious beliefs, 0.4% Buddhist, 0.5% New Age, and 1.4% other religions. People who answered that they had no religion were 63.1%, and 7.1% of people did not answer the census question.

Of those at least 15 years old, 273 (19.8%) people had a bachelor's or higher degree, 756 (54.8%) had a post-high school certificate or diploma, and 246 (17.8%) people exclusively held high school qualifications. The median income was $52,100, compared with $41,500 nationally. 297 people (21.5%) earned over $100,000 compared to 12.1% nationally. The employment status of those at least 15 was that 792 (57.4%) people were employed full-time, 237 (17.2%) were part-time, and 27 (2.0%) were unemployed.

== Education ==
Waitoki School is a coeducational full primary (years 1-8) school with a roll of 108 students as of July 2026. The school opened in 1924 and celebrated its 75th anniversary in 1999.
