= Titirangi Rudolf Steiner School =

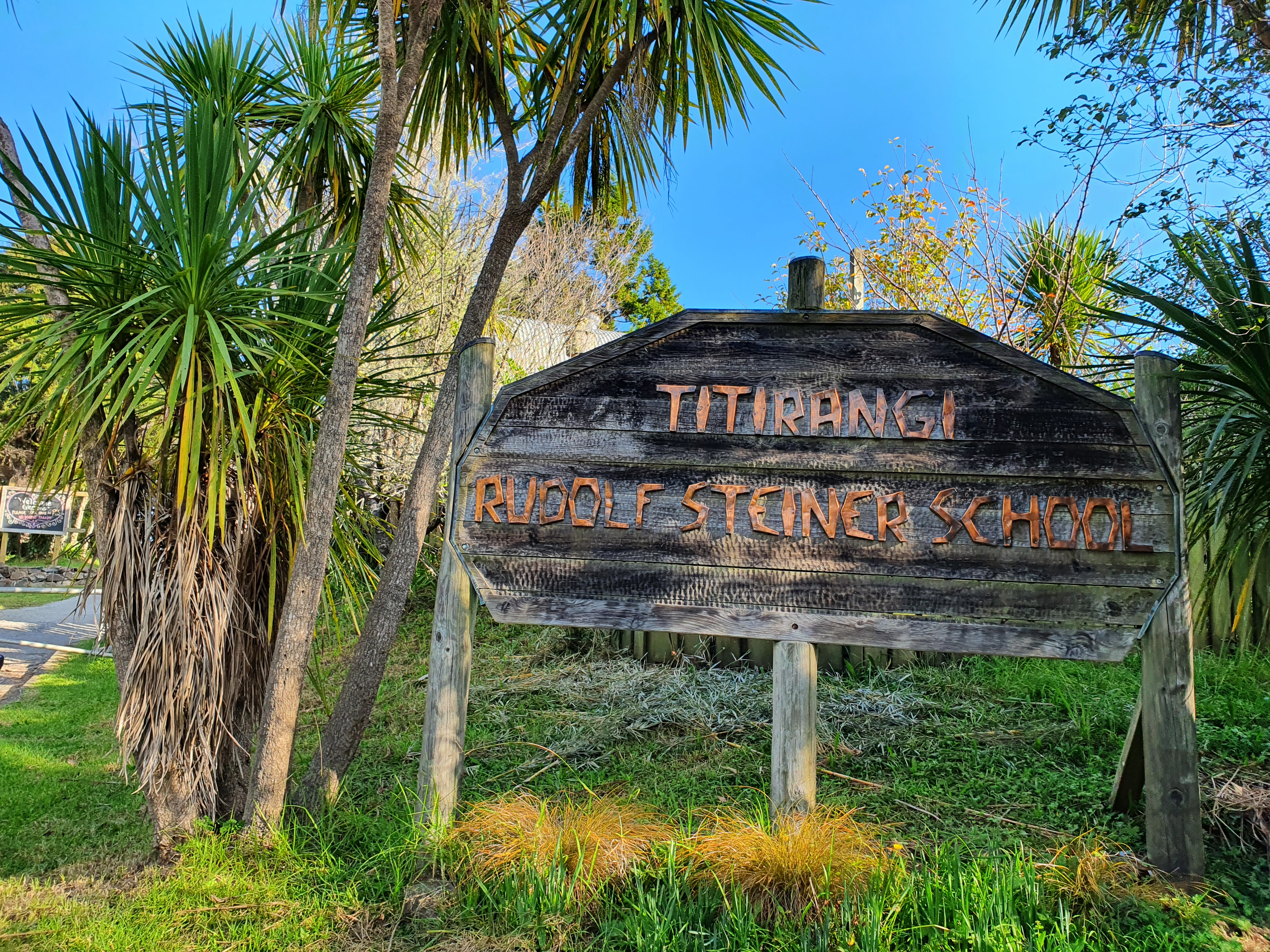
- Main gates of Titirangi Rudolf Steiner School

Location
- 5 Helios Place, Titirangi, Auckland, New Zealand; 36°57′5.8″S 174°38′24.38″E

Information
- Type: Co-educational, non-denominational, and independent (Playgroup to High School)
- Established: 1987
- Ministry of Education Institution no.: 1595
- Enrolment: 182 (July 2026)
- Socio-economic decile: 9
- Website: titirangi.steiner.school.nz

Titirangi Rudolf Steiner School (TRSS) is a privately funded school with a unique educational approach known as a Waldorf school, situated in Auckland, New Zealand.

The school offers a co-educational, non-denominational, and independent education for students from birth to eighteen years old (Playgroup to High School), following the pedagogical philosophy of Rudolf Steiner.

The curriculum and environment at Titirangi Rudolf Steiner School are designed to encourage and cultivate independent thinking and social responsibility. The school views students as holistic beings—body, soul, and spirit—and guides their development towards self-compassion and respect for both themselves and the global community through the exploration of their academic, artistic, and social potential.

== History ==
Established in 1987, the school began its journey as a play centre in the Titirangi Beach Hall. It then transitioned to Parau before settling on its present site, which was formerly owned by the Crown Lynn ceramics company.

== Location ==
The school is situated on a 29-hectare site within the West Auckland's Waitākere Ranges.

== Demographics ==
As of the 2018 Education Review Office report, the school had a total of 179 students, including 18 international students. Among them, 58% were female and 42% were male. The student body encompassed a diversity of backgrounds, with 79% being Pākehā, 4% Māori, 12% Asian, 3% Pacific, and 2% from other racial backgrounds. The Education Review Office also confirmed that the school met the criteria for private school registration.

The Kindergarten associated with the school was reviewed separately by the Education Review Office. The report indicated that 80% of the teachers at the Kindergarten were qualified. In terms of demographics, the Kindergarten slightly differed from the main school. The Titirangi Rudolf Steiner Kindergarten 1 had 53 pupils at the time of review, with 28 male and 25 female students. The ethnic composition was 40% Pākehā, 3% Māori, 2% Japanese, 6% of European descent, and 2% from other racial backgrounds.

== See also ==
- Curriculum of the Waldorf schools
- Rudolf Steiner
- Anthroposophy
