= Private school =

School that is not dependent upon the state

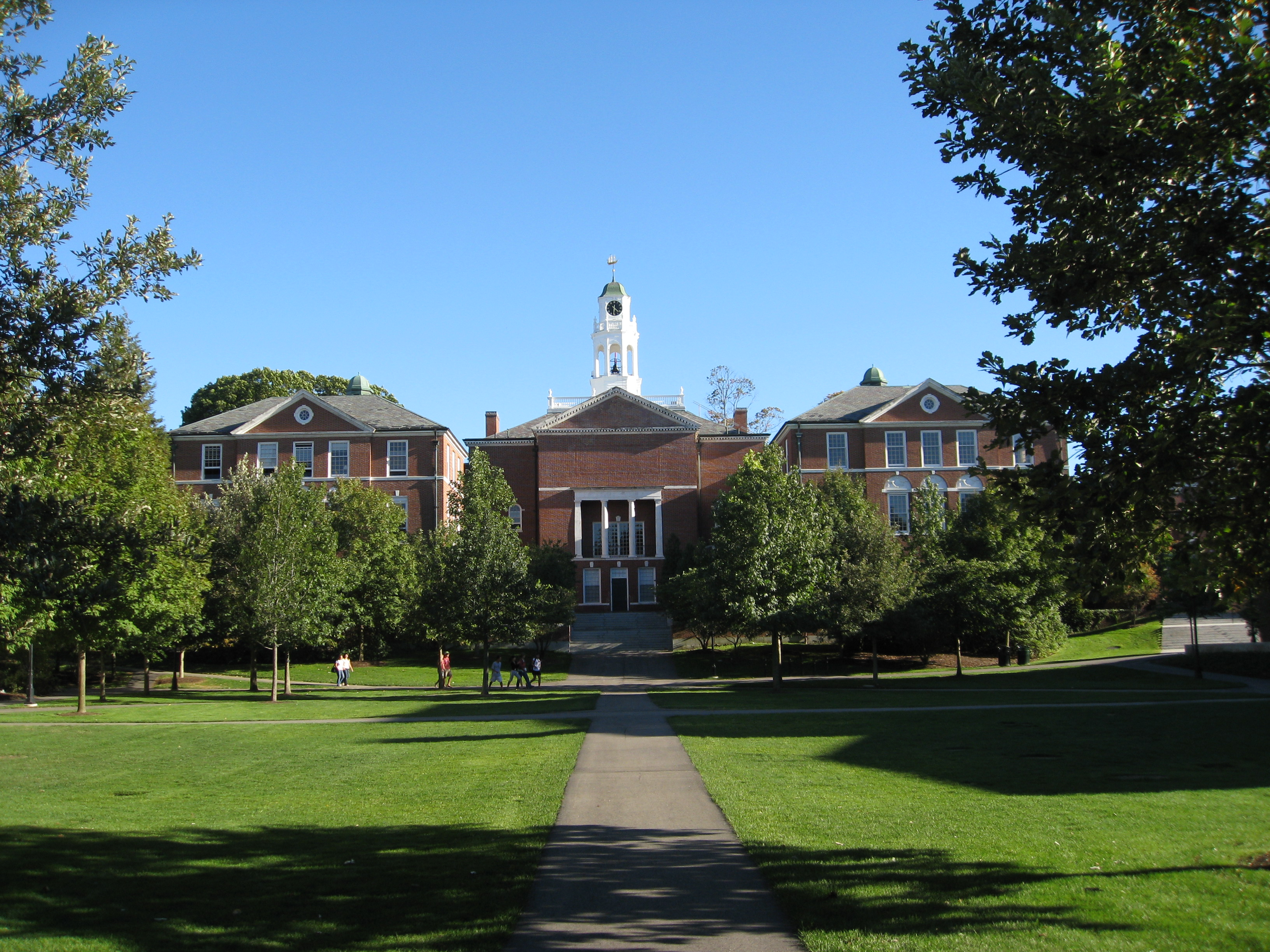
Phillips Exeter Academy in Exeter, New Hampshire, founded in 1781, one of the oldest private boarding schools in the United States

Share enrolled in private institutions at the pre-primary education level (2015)

Share enrolled in private institutions at the primary education level (2015)

Share enrolled in private institutions at the tertiary education level (2015)

A private school or independent school is a school not administered or funded by the government, unlike a public school. (Note: For historical reasons, in England and Wales, some elite, fee-charging private schools for 13- to 18-year-olds are described as 'public schools'.) Private schools are not dependent upon national or local government for their funding. Unless privately owned, they typically have a board of governors and have a system of governance that ensures their independent operation.

Private schools retain the right to select their students and are funded in whole or in part by charging their students for tuition, rather than relying on taxation through public (government) funding; at some private schools students may be eligible for a scholarship, lowering this tuition fee, dependent on a student's talents or abilities (e.g., sports scholarship, art scholarship, academic scholarship), need for financial aid, or tax credit scholarships that might be available. Roughly one in 10 U.S. families have chosen to enroll their children in private school for the past century.

Some private schools are associated with a particular religious denomination or religion, such as Roman Catholicism, various branches of Protestantism, or Judaism. Although private schools may have a religious affiliation, the precise use of the term excludes parochial (and other) schools if there is a financial dependence upon, or governance subordinate to, outside (religious) organizations. These definitions generally apply equally to both primary and secondary education.

== Types ==
In the United Kingdom and several other Commonwealth countries including Australia, Canada, and New Zealand, the use of the term is generally restricted to primary and secondary educational levels, and it is almost never used of universities or other tertiary institutions. Private education in North America covers the whole gamut of educational activity, ranging from pre-school to tertiary level institutions. Annual tuition fees at K–12 schools range from nothing at so called 'tuition-free' schools to more than $45,000 at several New England University-preparatory schools.

The secondary level includes university-preparatory schools, boarding schools, and day schools. Tuition at private secondary schools varies from school to school and depends on many factors, including the school's location, the willingness of parents to pay, peer tuitions, and the school's financial endowment. Some private schools are boarding schools, and many military academies are privately owned or operated as well.

Religiously affiliated and denominational schools form a subcategory of private schools. Some such schools teach religious education, together with the usual academic subjects, to impress their particular faith's beliefs and traditions in the students who attend. Others use the denomination as a general label to describe what the founders based their belief, while still maintaining a fine distinction between academics and religion. They include parochial schools, a term which is often used to denote Roman Catholic schools. Other religious groups represented in the K–12 private education sector include Protestants, Jews, Muslims, and Orthodox Christians.

Many educational alternatives, such as private schools or online schools, are privately financed. Private schools often avoid some state regulations, although in the name of educational quality, most comply with regulations relating to the educational content of classes. Religious private schools often add religious instruction to the courses provided by local public schools.

Special assistance schools aim to improve the lives of their students by providing services tailored to the particular needs of individual students. Such schools include tutoring schools and schools to assist the learning of disabled children.

== By country ==
=== Australia ===
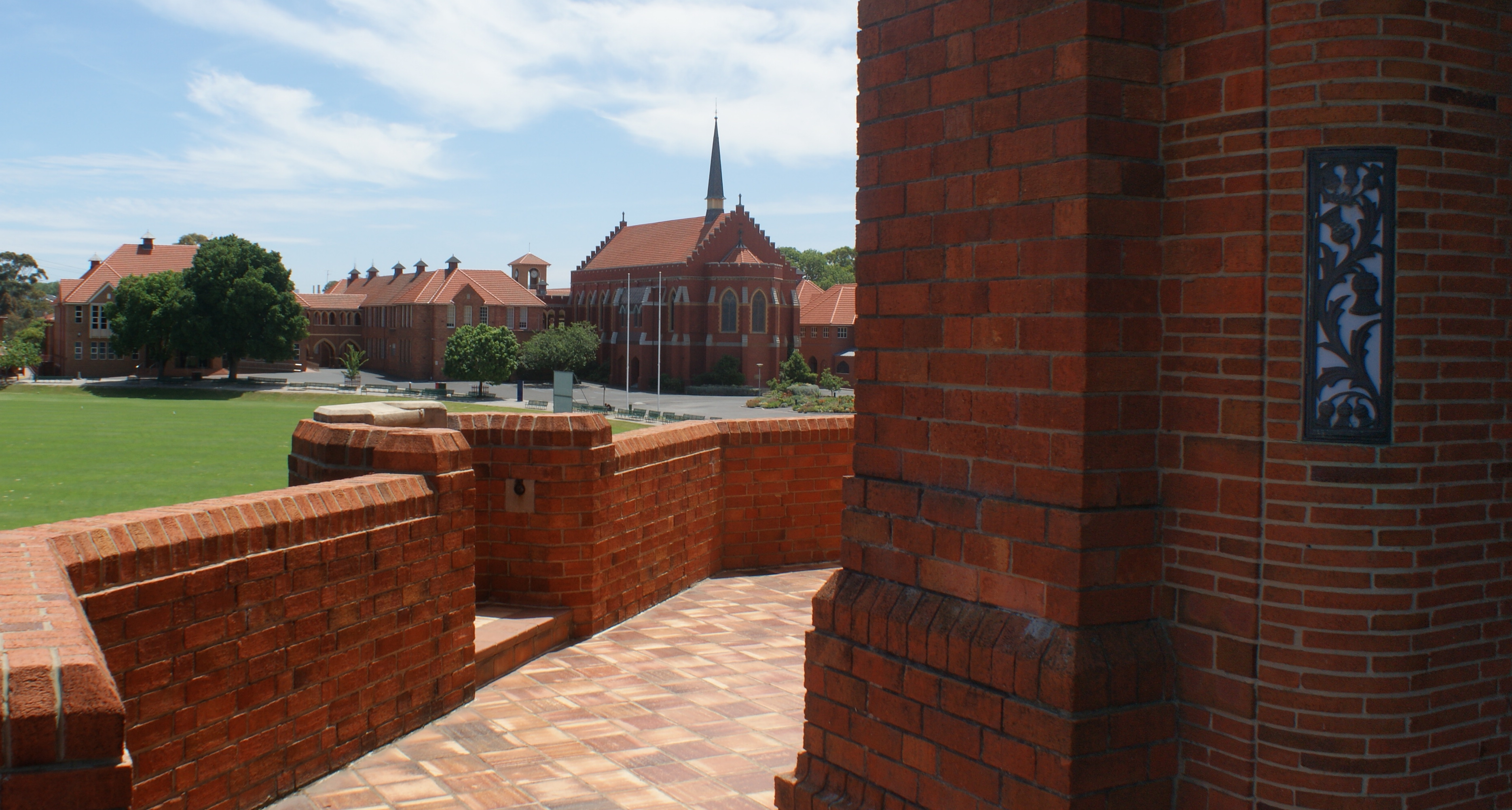
Scotch College in Melbourne

In Australia, private schools are mostly operated by an independently elected school council or board of governors and range broadly in the type of school-education provided and the socio-economics of the school community served. Most private schools are run by religious institutes while others have no religious affiliation and are driven by a national philosophy (such as international schools), pedogogical philosophy (such as Waldorf-Steiner schools), or specific needs (such as special schools).

Australia has one of the most privatised education systems in the world with 30 per cent of primary students and more than 40 per cent of secondary students attending private schools. In contrast the OECD average is 18 per cent. Catholic schools make up a sizeable proportion of total enrolment (nearly 15%) and are usually regarded as a school sector of their own within the broad category of private schools, often charging lower fees than Protestant private schools. Enrolment in non-government schools have been growing steadily at the expense of enrolments in government schools, which have seen their enrolment share reduce from 78.1 percent to 65 percent since 1970, although the rate of growth of private schools has slowed in the later years.

Australian private schools differ from those in other OECD nations as the Australian Government provides funding ("State aid") to all schools including private schools. In 2013, after release of the (first) Gonski Report, the funding formula was changed to compute individual school funding compared to a School Resourcing Standard (SRS). The SRS uses exam results from the National Assessment Program – Literacy and Numeracy tests, calculates the SRS from a cohort of well-performing schools, and applies this formula to other schools on the assumption that they should be able to achieve similar results from similar funding. The funding provided to private schools is on a sliding scale and still has a "capacity to pay" element; however, on average, funding granted to the private school sector is 40 percent of that required to operate government schools, the remainder being made up by tuition fees and donations from parents. The majority of the funding comes from the Commonwealth Government, while the state and territory governments provide about one-third of the Commonwealth amount. The Turnbull government commissioned Gonski in 2017 to chair the independent Review to Achieve Educational Excellence in Australian Schools, commonly called Gonski 2.0. The government published the report on 30 April 2018.

Following negotiation, bilateral agreements between the Commonwealth of Australia with each state and territory commenced on 1 January 2019, with the exception of Victoria, whose bilateral agreement commenced on 1 February 2019. The funding agreements provide states with funding for government schools (20 percent) and non-government schools (80 percent) taking into consideration annual changes in enrolment numbers, indexation and student or school characteristics. A National School Resourcing Board was charged with the responsibility of independently reviewing each state's compliance with the funding agreement(s).

Private school fees can vary from under $100 per month to $2,000 and upwards, depending on the student's year level, the school's size, and the socio-economics of the school community. In late 2018 it was reported the most expensive private schools (such as AAGPS and CAS schools in New South Wales, GPS and QGSSSA schools in Queensland, AGSV and APS schools in Victoria) charge fees of up to $500,000 for thirteen years of education. The oldest private school in Australia is The King's School, founded in 1831.

Catholic schools form the second-largest sector after government schools, with around 21% of secondary enrolments. Catholic schools, typically have a strong religious focus and usually most of the staff and students are Catholic.

=== Canada ===
In 1999, 5.6% of Canadian students were enrolled in private schools, some of which are religious or faith-based schools, including Christian, Jewish, and Islamic schools. Some private schools in Canada are considered world-class, especially some boarding schools. Private schools have sometimes been controversial, with some in the media and in Ontario's Provincial Ministry of Education asserting that students may buy inflated grades from private schools.

=== Finland ===
In Finland, education takes place in state-run, municipality-run, and private schools. To qualify for public funding, all schools must receive a license from the Ministry of Education and Culture and align with the national curriculum and educational standards. While education is generally free, schools that offer instruction in languages other than the official languages of Finland (for example in English) may charge modest fees. There are also unlicensed private schools that do not follow any national curriculum and do not receive public funding. Certificates obtained from such institutions are not recognized as valid proof of education.

In 2018, private schools accounted for 3% of basic education institutions and 9% of upper secondary education institutions. All Universities of Applied Sciences are either privately owned or municipality-owned companies or foundations. Some private Universities in Finland operate without legal mandate and are not overseen by the Ministry of Education and Culture. Graduates from these universities must undergo the same verification process as those holding foreign degrees.

=== Germany ===
The right to create private schools in Germany is in Article 7, Paragraph 4 of the Grundgesetz and cannot be suspended even in a state of emergency. It is also not possible to abolish these rights. This unusual protection of private schools was implemented to protect these schools from a second Gleichschaltung or similar event in the future.

=== Italy ===
In Italy education is predominantly public; about one-fifth of schools are private, attended by about one out of 10 Italian schoolchildren. The Italian constitution states that education is to be public, free, and compulsory for at least eight years.

=== India ===
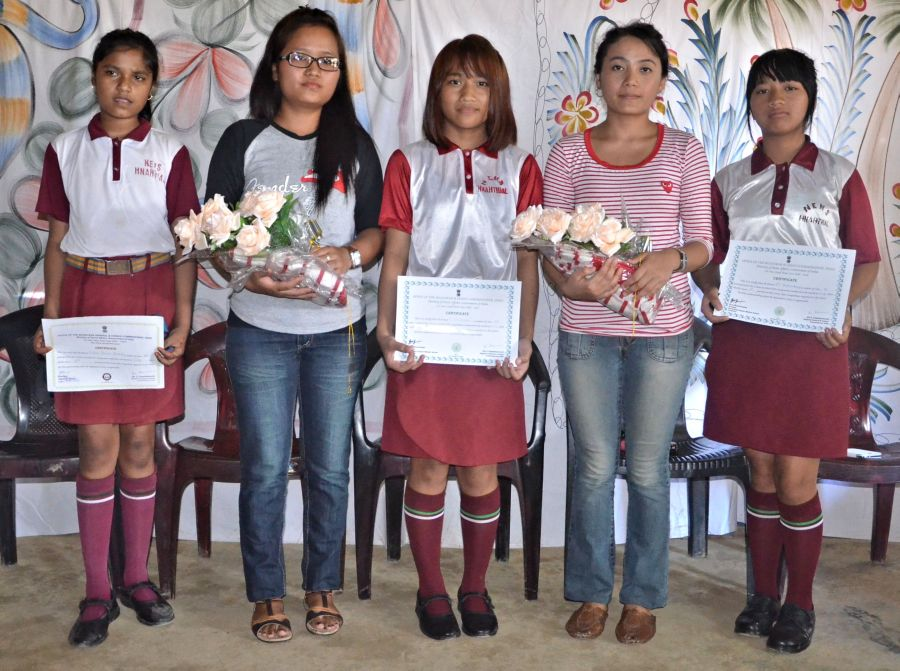
Students at a private school in Hnahthial

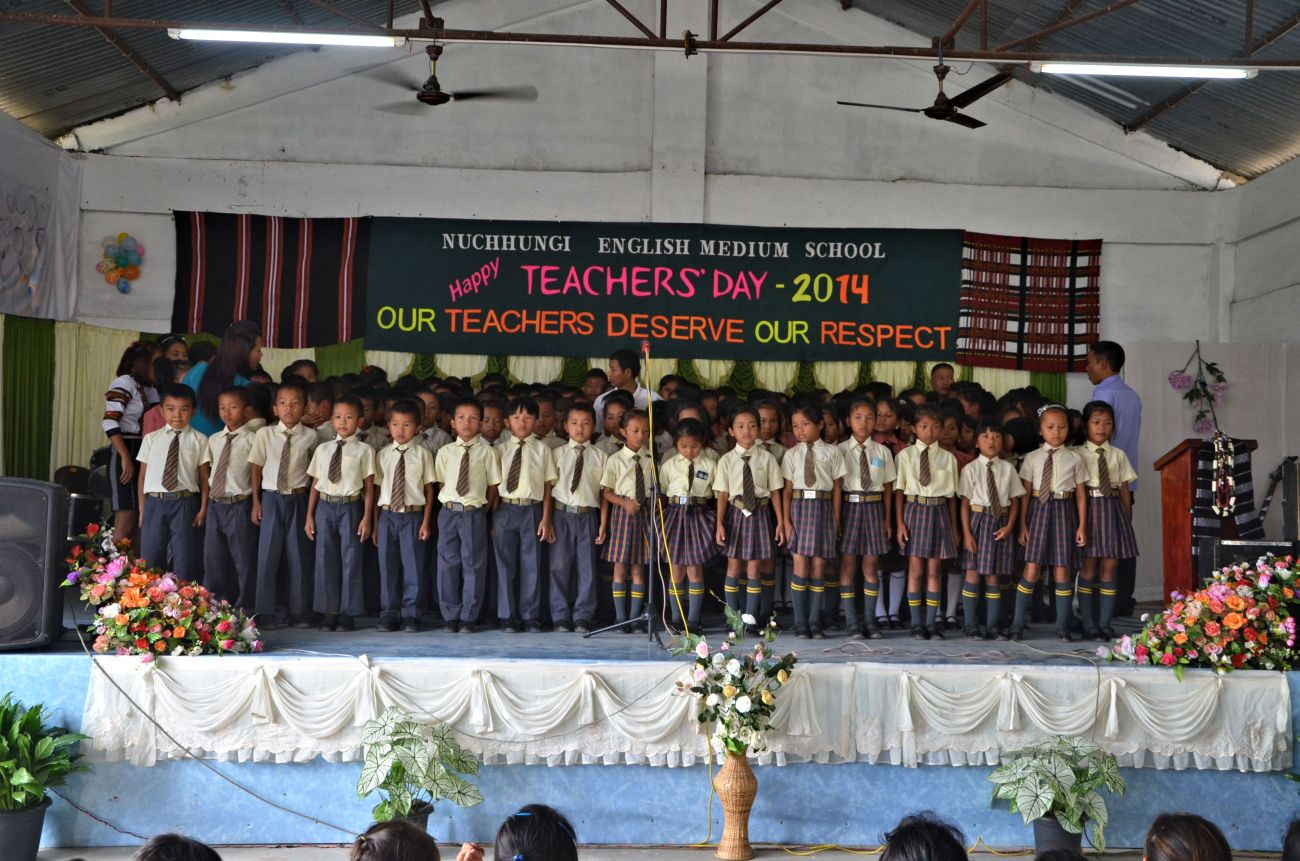
An independent school in Hnahthial

In India, private schools are called independent schools, but since some private schools receive financial aid from the government, it can be an aided or an unaided school. Demand for private schools has been growing over the years. While a consensus over what is the most significant driver of this growth in private schooling has not yet emerged, some authors have attributed this to a higher demand for English-medium education, a dissatisfaction with the quality of public schools, greater affordability of private schools, and non-availability of preferred field of study in government schools. After the adoption of the Right to Education (RTE) Act 2009, private schools were required to be 'government-recognised'. A private school would be eligible for government recognition when it met certain conditions.

At the primary and secondary level, India has a large private school system complementing the government run schools, with 29% of students receiving private education in the 6 to 14 age group. Certain post-secondary technical schools are also private. The private education market in India had a revenue of US$450 million in 2008, but is projected to be a US$40 billion market. Although there are private schools in India, they are highly regulated in terms of what they can teach, in what form they can operate (must be a non-profit to run any accredited educational institution) and all the other aspects of the operation. Hence, the differentiation between government schools and private schools can be misleading.

=== Iran ===
A lot of criticism towards Iranian government is because of large gap of University entrance Exam success between public and private school students, number private school growth has seen a 15% growth dominating Iranian education sector. there is a rise of "luxury" schools. Studying for one year term in private schools may cost 50 million as of July 2023.

=== Ireland ===
In Ireland, the internationally recognised definition of "private school" is misleading and a more accurate distinction is between fee-charging schools and non-fee-charging schools. This is because approximately 85% of all schools are private schools (Irish: scoil phríobháideach) by virtue of not being owned by the state. The Roman Catholic Church is the largest owner of schools in Ireland, with other religious institutions owning the remaining private schools. Nevertheless, despite the vast majority of schools being under the ownership of private institutions, a large majority of all their costs, including teachers' salaries, are paid for by the Irish state. Of these private schools, only a very small minority actually charge fees. In 2007, 'The number of schools permitted to charge fees represents 7.6% of the 723 post primary level schools and they cater for 7.1% of the total enrolment.' If a fee-charging school wishes to employ extra teachers they are paid for with school fees, which tend to be relatively low in Ireland compared to the rest of the world. Because state funding plays a fundamental role in the finances of all but one fee-charging school, they must undergo similar state inspection to non-fee-charging schools. This is due to the requirement that the state ensure that children receive a certain minimum education; Irish state subsidised fee-charging schools must still work towards the Junior Certificate and the Leaving Certificate, for example.

The single fee-charging secondary school in Ireland which receives no state funding, the Nord Anglia International School Dublin, does not have to undergo the state supervision which all the other fee-charging schools undergo. Students there also sit the International Baccalaureate rather than the Irish Leaving Certificate which every other Irish secondary school student sits. In exchange, however, Nord Anglia students pay some €25,000 per annum in fees, compared to c. €4,000 – €8,000 per annum fees by students in all other fee-charging Irish schools. Many fee-charging schools in Ireland also double as boarding schools. The fees for these may then rise up to €25,000 per year. All the state-subsidised fee-charging schools are run by a religious order, e.g., the Society of Jesus or Congregation of Christian Brothers, etc. The major private schools being Blackrock College, Clongowes Wood College, Castleknock College, Belvedere College, Gonzaga College and Terenure College. There are also a few fee-charging international schools in Ireland, including a French school, a Japanese school and a German school.

=== Malaysia ===
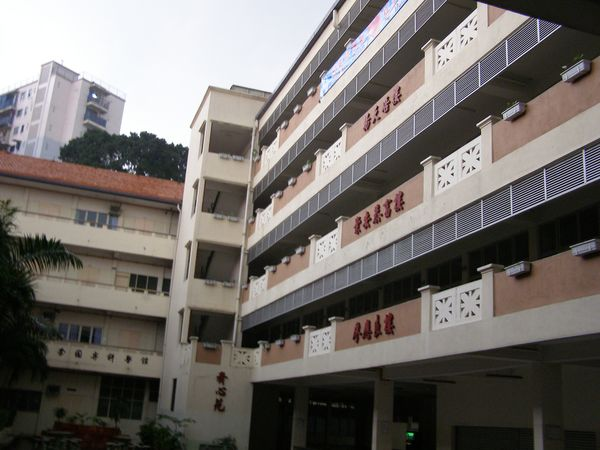
Tsun Jin High School (Chinese: 循人中学; pinyin: Xún Rén Zhōngxué), a Chinese independent high school in Kuala Lumpur

Chinese schools were being founded by the ethnic Chinese in Malaysia as early as the 19th century. They provide secondary education in the Chinese language as the continuation of the primary education in Chinese national-type primary schools. The main medium of instruction in these schools is Mandarin Chinese using simplified Chinese characters.

Being private schools, Chinese independent high schools do not receive consistent funding from the Malaysian government, although they did receive some funding from some state governments as well as in the 2019 and 2020 budgets under the Pakatan Harapan government. However, in accordance with their aim of providing affordable education to all in the Chinese language, their school fees are substantially lower than those of most other private schools. The schools are kept alive almost exclusively by donations from the public.

=== Netherlands ===
In the Netherlands, over two-thirds of state-funded schools operate autonomously, with many of these schools being linked to faith groups. The Programme for International Student Assessment, coordinated by the OECD, ranks the education in the Netherlands as the 9th best in the world as of 2008, being significantly higher than the OECD average.

=== New Zealand ===
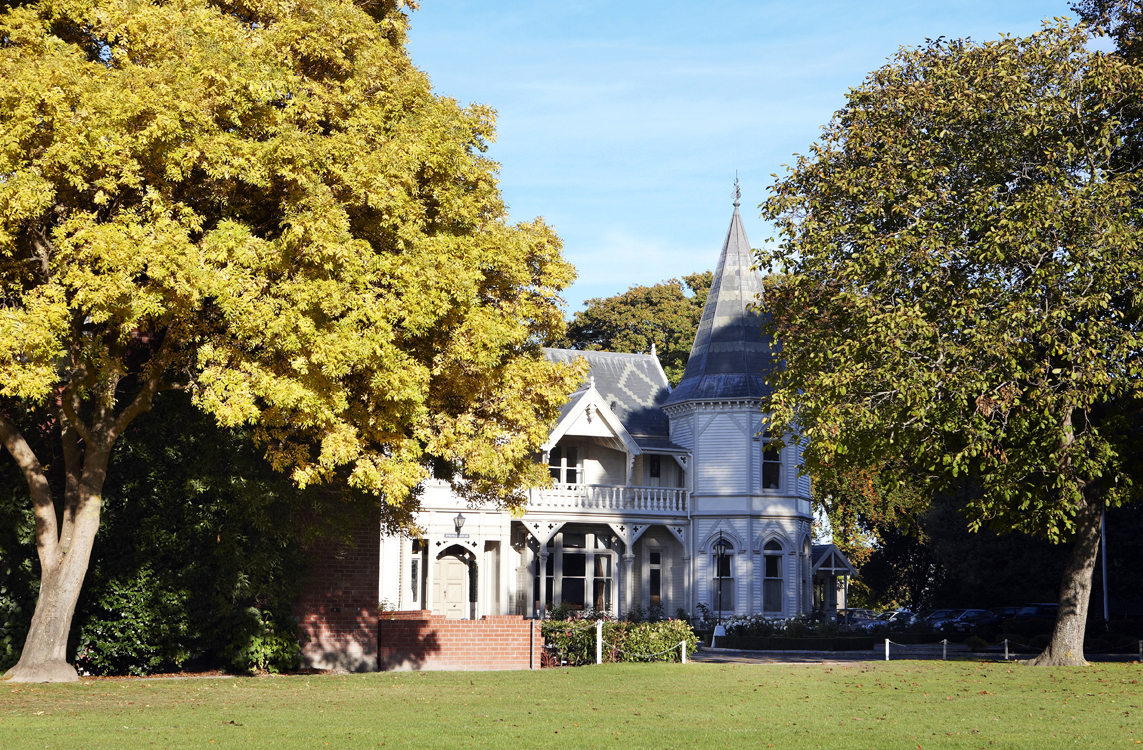
St Andrew's College, an independent primary and secondary school in Christchurch

As of April 2014, there were 88 private schools in New Zealand, catering for around 28,000 students or 3.7% of the entire student population. Private school numbers have been in decline since the mid-1970s as a result of many private schools opting to become state-integrated schools, mostly due to financial difficulties stemming from changes in student numbers or the economy. State-integrated schools keep their private school special character and receives state funds in return for having to operate like a state school, e.g. they must teach the state curriculum, they must employ registered teachers, and they can not charge tuition fees (they can charge "attendance dues" for the upkeep on the still-private school land and buildings). The largest decline in private school numbers occurred between 1979 and 1984, when the nation's then-private Catholic school system integrated. As a result, private schools in New Zealand are now largely restricted to the largest cities (Auckland, Hamilton, Wellington and Christchurch) and niche markets.

Private schools are almost fully funded by tuition fees paid by students' parents, but they do receive some government subsidies. Private schools are popular for academic and sporting performance, prestige, exclusivity and old boys/girls networks; however, many state-integrated schools and some prestigious single-sex state schools, such as Auckland Grammar School and Wellington College, are actively competitive with private schools in academic and sporting achievement, history and character.

Private schools are often Anglican, such as King's College and Diocesan School for Girls in Auckland, St Paul's Collegiate School in Hamilton, St Peter's School in Cambridge, Samuel Marsden Collegiate School in Wellington, and Christ's College and St Margaret's College in Christchurch; or Presbyterian, such as Saint Kentigern College and St Cuthbert's College in Auckland, Scots College and Queen Margaret College in Wellington, and St Andrew's College and Rangi Ruru Girls' School in Christchurch. However, the Catholic schismatic group, the Society of St Pius X in Wanganui operates three private schools (including the secondary school, St Dominic's College). A recent group of private schools run as a business has been formed by Academic Colleges Group; with schools throughout Auckland, including ACG Senior College in Auckland's CBD, ACG Parnell College in Parnell, and international school ACG New Zealand International College.

=== Philippines ===
In the Philippines, the private sector has been a major provider of educational services. Private schools are generally free to determine their curriculum in accordance with existing laws and regulations. Science high schools are special schools for the more intellectually promising students to foster the problem-solving approach of critical thinking. As separate high schools, they have specific characteristics not found in regular high schools. However, any private or public high school can aspire to meet these minimum standards and be considered a science high school.

The Fund for Assistance to Private Education (FAPE) is a perpetual trust fund for private education created by Executive Order № 156 s. 1968 and amended by Executive Order № 150 s. 1994. FAPE was created on November 5, 1968 by Executive Order No. 156, in implementation of the project agreement between the Philippine and United States governments to establish a permanent trust fund that would address the needs of the private education sector in the country.

=== Portugal ===
In Portugal, private schools were traditionally set up by foreign expatriates and diplomats in order to cater for their educational needs. Portuguese-speaking private schools are widespread across Portugal's main cities. International private schools are mainly concentrated in and around Lisbon, Porto, Braga, Coimbra and Covilhã, across the Portuguese region of Algarve, and in the autonomous region of Madeira. The Ministério da Educação acts as the supervisory and regulatory body for all schools, including international schools.

=== Singapore ===
In Singapore, after Primary School Leaving Examination (PSLE), students can choose to enter a private high school. Private tuition is a lucrative industry in Singapore, since many parents send their children for private tuition after school. A straw poll by The Straits Times newspaper in 2008 found that out of 100 students interviewed, only 3 students did not have any form of tuition. In 2010, the Shin Min Daily News estimated that there were around 540 tuition centres offering private tuition in Singapore. Due to their high demand, tuition centres are able to charge high fees for their services; they have an annual turnover of SGD$110.6 million in 2005. The official government stance on private tuition is that "it understands parents want the best for their children and that it is their decision whether to engage tutors".

=== South Africa ===
Some of the oldest schools in South Africa are private church schools that were established by missionaries in the early nineteenth century. The private sector has grown ever since. After the abolition of apartheid, the laws governing private education in South Africa changed significantly. The South African Schools Act of 1996 recognizes two categories of schools: "public" (state-controlled) and "independent" (which includes traditional private schools and schools which are privately governed).

In the final years of the apartheid era, parents at white government schools were given the option to convert to a "semi-private" form called Model C, and many of these schools changed their admissions policies to accept children classified to be of other races. These schools tend to produce better academic results than government schools formerly reserved for other "race groups". Former "Model C" schools are state-controlled, not private. All schools in South Africa (including both independent and public schools) have the right to set compulsory school fees, and formerly model C schools tend to set much higher school fees than other public schools.

=== Sweden ===
In Sweden, pupils are free to choose a private school and the private school gets paid the same amount as municipal schools. Over 10% of Swedish pupils were enrolled in private schools in 2008. Sweden is internationally known for this innovative school voucher model that provides Swedish pupils with the opportunity to choose the school they prefer. For instance, the biggest school chain, Kunskapsskolan ("The Knowledge School"), offers 30 schools and a web-based environment, has 700 employees and teaches nearly 10,000 pupils.

=== United Kingdom ===
In the UK, the term "private schools" encompasses schools that are independently funded and not part of the state system. These schools are known as independent schools. Within this category, "public schools" refer to a specific group of prestigious, often older, independent schools. Private schools also encompass faith based schools. Preparatory schools in England and Wales prepare pupils up to 13 years old to enter public schools. In Scotland, where the education system has always been separate from the rest of Great Britain, the term 'public school' was used historically to refer to state schools for the general public.

According to The Good Schools Guide about 7% of children being educated in the United Kingdom are at fee-charging schools at GCSE level and 13% at A-level. Some independent schools are single-sex, although this is becoming less common. Average school fees in 2026 are roughly £22,500 to £24,000 per year for day pupils and around £54,000 per year for boarding, including the 20% VAT introduced in January 2025. Costs differ in Scotland.

One in four independently educated children come from postcodes with the national average income or below, and one in three receive assistance with school fees. Evidence from a major longitudinal study suggests that British independent schools provide advantages in educational attainment and access to top universities.

==== England and Wales ====
In England and Wales, the more prestigious independent schools are known as 'public schools', sometimes subdivided into major and minor public schools. A modern definition of a public school refers to membership of the Headmasters' and Headmistresses' Conference, and this includes many independent grammar schools. The term 'public school' historically meant that the school was open to the public (as opposed to private tutors or the school being in private ownership). Many private schools actively compete with prestigious state schools (including state grammar schools and single sex schools) in academic achievements.

There are many old, world-renowned institutions in England that served as inspiration for most schools of their type abroad. These schools include Winchester College, Eton College, St Paul's School, Harrow School, Westminster School, Charterhouse School, Haileybury & Imperial Service College and Rugby School. The Independent Schools Inspectorate regularly publishes reports on the quality of education in all independent schools.

==== Scotland ====
In Scotland, schools not state-funded are known as independent or private schools. Independent schools may also be specialist or special schools – such as some music schools, Steiner Waldorf Education schools, or special education schools.

Scottish independent schools currently educate over 31,000 students and employ approximately 3,500 teachers. Schools are represented by the Scottish Council of Independent Schools (SCIS). All schools are still inspected by the state inspectorate, Education Scotland, and the Care Inspectorate. Independent schools in Scotland that are charities are subject to a specific test from the Office of the Scottish Charity Regulator, designed to demonstrate the public benefit the schools provide.

=== United States ===
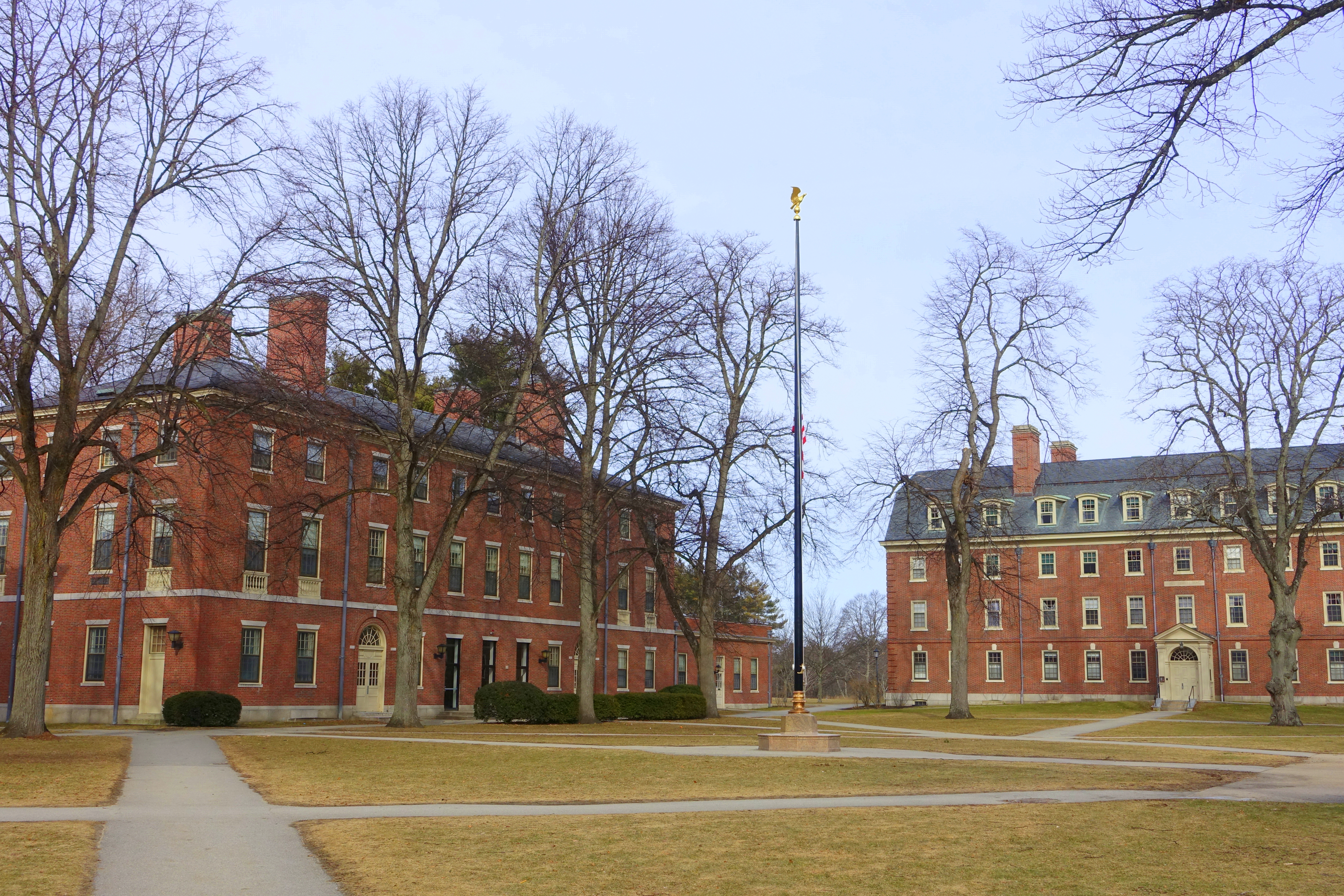
Phillips Academy in Andover, Massachusetts

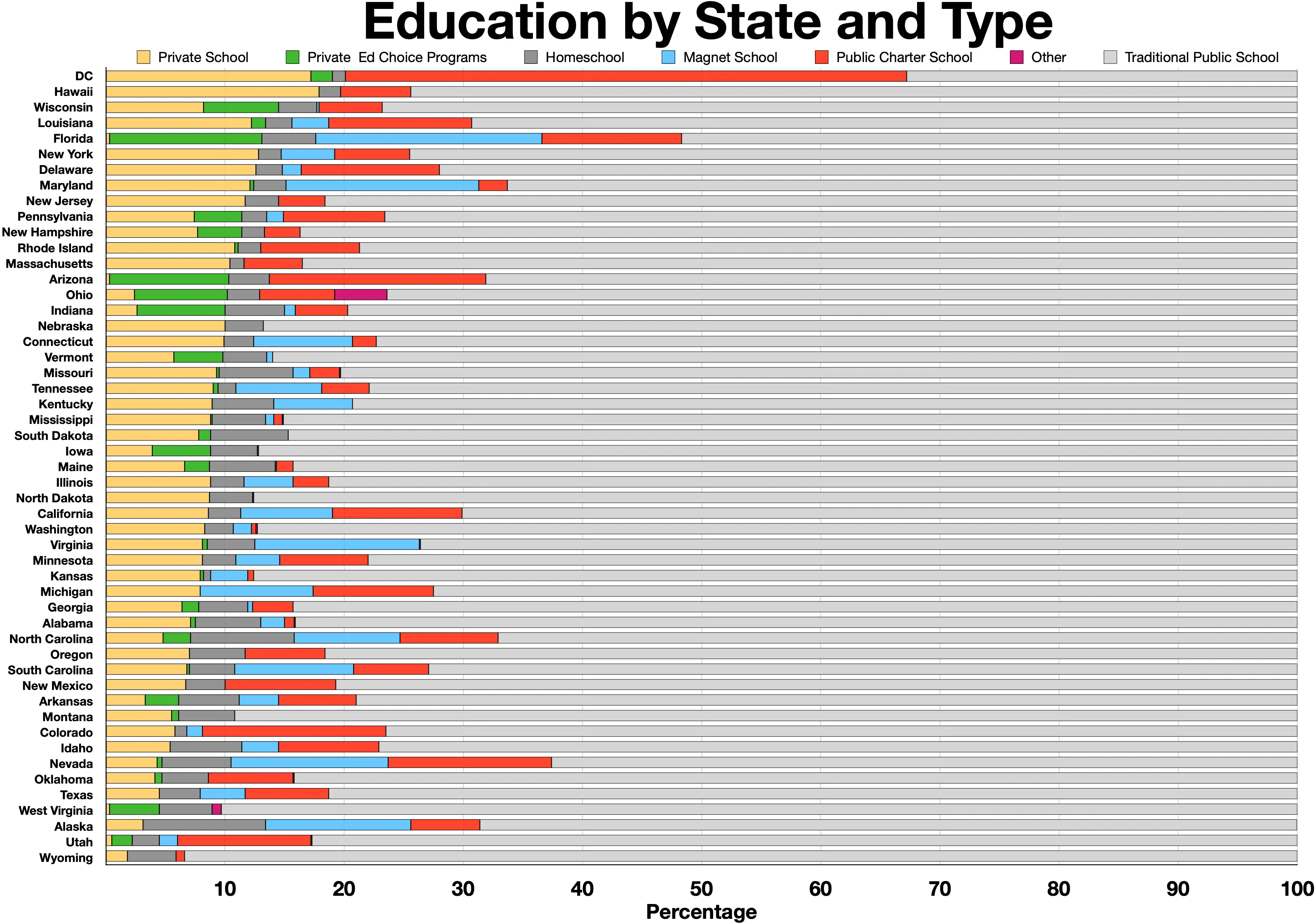
Percent of students attending a private school Private school Private EdChoice Homeschool Magnet school Public charter school Public school

In the United States, a private school is any for which the facilities and funding are not provided by the federal, state or local government, or in the case of charter schools, independently with government funding and regulation (as opposed to a public school, which is operated by the government). A majority of private schools in the United States are operated by religious institutions and organizations. In practice, the term "private school" is commonly used to denote a non-sectarian school, whereas "church school", "Christian school", and (for Catholic institutions) "parochial school" are used to denote sectarian ones.

Independent schools in the United States educate around 10% of the entire school-age population.

The essential distinction between independent schools and other private schools is self-governance and financial independence. In contrast, public schools are funded and governed by local and state governments, and most parochial schools are owned, governed, and financed by religious institutions such as a diocese or parish. Independent schools may be affiliated with a particular religion or denomination; however, unlike parochial schools, independent schools are self-owned and governed by independent boards of trustees. While independent schools are not subject to significant government oversight or regulation, they are accredited by the same six regional accreditation agencies that accredit public schools. The National Association of Independent Schools (NAIS) is a membership organization of American pre-college independent schools.

The NAIS provides this definition of an independent school:

Independent schools are 501(c)(3) nonprofit corporate entities, independent in governance and finance, meaning:

1. Independent schools "own themselves" (as opposed to public schools owned by the government or parochial schools owned by the church) and govern themselves, typically with a self-perpetuating board of trustees that performs fiduciary duties of oversight and strategic duties of funding and setting the direction and vision of the enterprise, and by delegating day to day operations entirely to the head of school.
2. Independent schools finance themselves (as opposed to public schools funded through the government and parochial schools subsidized by the church), largely through charging tuition, fund raising, and income from endowment.

Independence is the unique characteristic of this segment of the education industry, offering schools four freedoms that contribute to their success: the freedom to define their own unique missions; the freedom to admit and keep only those students well-matched to the mission; the freedom to define the qualifications for high quality teachers; and the freedom to determine on their own what to teach and how to assess student achievement and progress.

In the United States, the membership organization for independent tertiary education institutions is the National Association of Independent Colleges and Universities. Private schools are generally exempt from most educational regulations at the Federal level but are highly regulated at the state level. These typically require them to follow the spirit of regulations concerning the content of courses in an attempt to provide a level of education equal to or better than that available in public schools.

In the nineteenth century, as a response to the perceived domination of the public school systems by Protestant political and religious ideas, many Roman Catholic parish churches, dioceses and religious orders established schools, which operate entirely without government funding. For many years, the vast majority of private schools in the United States were Catholic schools.

In many parts of the United States, after the 1954 decision in the landmark court case Brown v. Board of Education of Topeka that demanded United States schools desegregate "with all deliberate speed", local families organized a wave of private "Christian academies". In much of the U.S. South, many white students migrated to the academies, while public schools became in turn more heavily concentrated with African-American students (see List of private schools in Mississippi). The academic content of the academies was usually college preparatory.

Funding for private schools is generally provided through student tuition, endowments, scholarship/school voucher funds, and donations and grants from religious organizations or private individuals. Government funding for religious schools is either subject to restrictions or possibly forbidden, according to the courts' interpretation of the Establishment Clause of the First Amendment or individual state Blaine Amendments. Non-religious private schools theoretically could qualify for such funding without hassle, preferring the advantages of independent control of their student admissions and course content instead of the public funding they could get with charter status. A similar concept, recently emerging from within the public school system, is the concept of charter schools, which are officially independent public schools, but in many respects operate similarly to nonreligious private schools.

The nature of private schooling in the United States has been debated by educators, lawmakers and parents, since the beginnings of compulsory education in Massachusetts in 1852. One of the most common topics of debate is whether or not the ability to select a private institution takes funding away from public schools. Many states base their funding off of how many students a school has but will also offer voucher programs. These programs and similar incentives exist to incentivize school choice and take stress off of state educational funding. However, it is also believed that taking students and funding out of public schools decreases the quality of these institutions. Still even with this, the Supreme Court precedent appears to favor educational choice, so long as states may set standards for educational accomplishment. Some of the most relevant Supreme Court case law on this is as follows: Runyon v. McCrary, 427 U.S. 160 (1976); Wisconsin v. Yoder, 406 U.S. 205 (1972); Pierce v. Society of Sisters, 268 U.S. 510 (1925); Meyer v. Nebraska, 262 U.S. 390 (1923). There is a potential conflict between the values espoused in the above cited cases and the limitations set forward in Article 29 of the United Nations Convention on the Rights of the Child, which is below described.

Quality private schools in the United States charge substantial tuition: in 2023, tuition cost close to $60,000 annually for some day schools in New York City, and between $65,000 and $85,000 for boarding schools. Nevertheless, tuition may not be sufficient to cover operating expenses, particularly at boarding schools. Leading schools such as the Groton School, Phillips Academy, and Phillips Exeter Academy have substantial endowments - running to over a billion dollars - supplemented by fundraising drives. Boarding schools with a reputation for quality in the United States have a student body drawn from throughout the United States, and in some cases other countries, and a list of applicants which far exceeds their capacity.

== See also ==
- Alternative school
- Convention Against Discrimination in Education
- Freedom of education
- List of Friends schools
- Lutheran school
- Right to education
- State school
- Voucher
