= John Paul College, Rotorua =

John Paul College
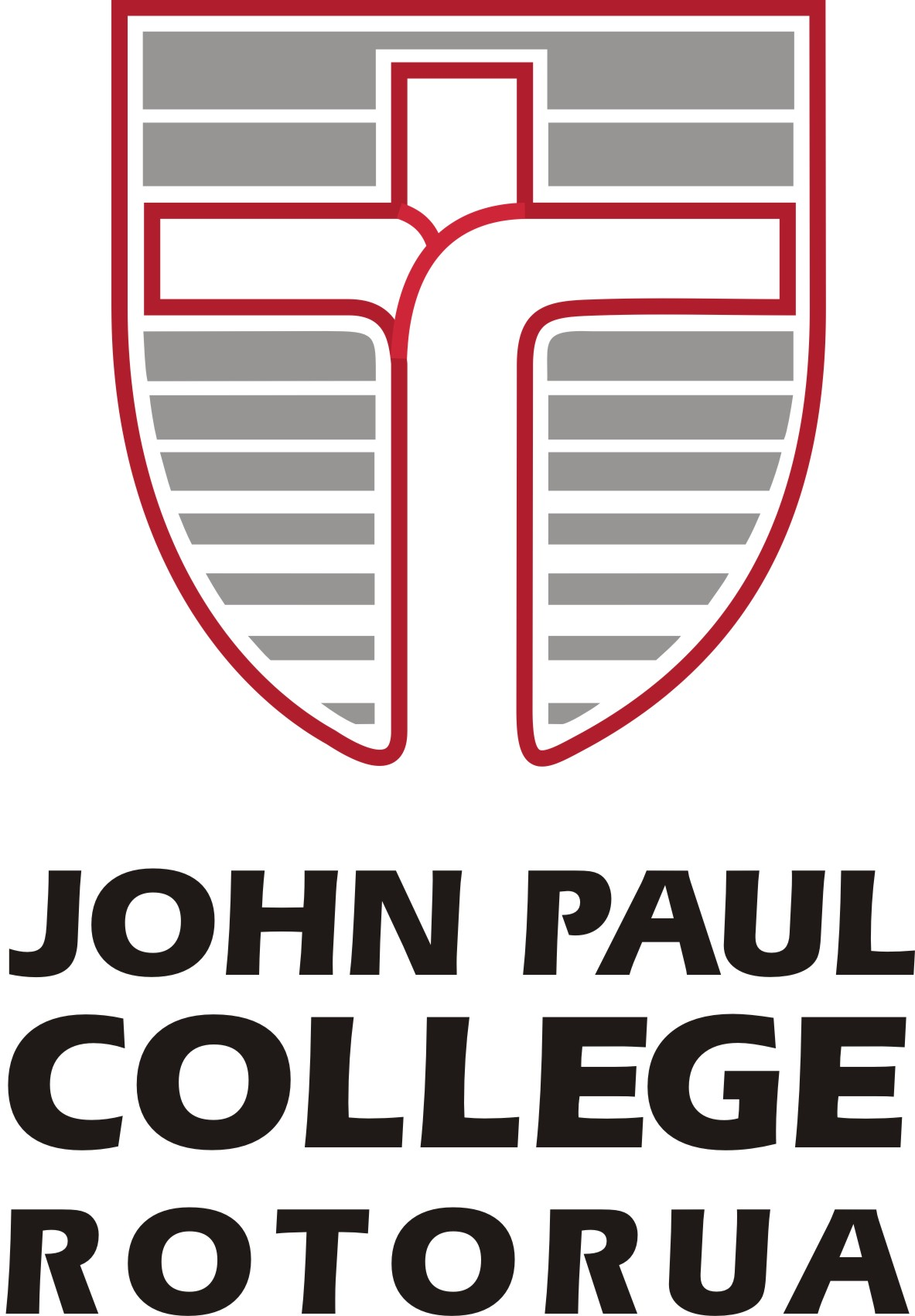

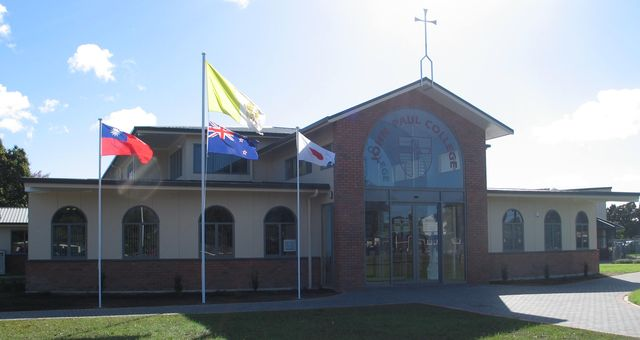
- John Paul College administration building

Location
- Whitworth Road, PO Box 5040; Rotorua West; New Zealand; 38.1432°S 176.2288°E

Information
- School type: State integrated secondary school semi-private
- Motto: Māori: Ma te Pono, Me te Aroha (Through Faith and Love)
- Religious affiliation: Catholic
- Patron saint: Saint Jean-Baptiste de la Salle Saint John Paul II
- Established: 1987; 39 years ago: Edmund Rice College (1963); MacKillop College (1966)
- Ministry of Education Institution no.: 532
- Chairperson: Jean-Paul Gaston
- Principal: Justin Harper
- Years offered: 7–13
- Gender: Co-educational
- Enrolment: 1,098 (July 2026)
- Socio-economic decile: 7O
- Website: jpc.school.nz

John Paul College is a Catholic secondary school in Rotorua, New Zealand. The co-educational school enrols students in years 7 to 13. It was opened in 1987 and combined two existing schools, Edmund Rice College (for boys) and MacKillop College (for girls). The school was founded to serve the Catholic families of Rotorua. John Paul College is named for Pope John Paul II. The proprietor of the school is the Bishop of Hamilton.

== Enrolment ==
John Paul College has a diverse, multicultural roll. In 2010, its ethnic composition was: NZ European/Pākehā 66%; Māori 14%; Asian 11%; Pacific 4%; Korean 3%; Indian 2%; Filipino 2% and Other 9%

In July 2026, John Paul College had a roll of 1,098 students, of whom 191 (17.4%) identified as Māori.

In 2026, the school had an Equity Index of 415, placing it amongst schools whose students have few socioeconomic barriers to achievement (roughly equivalent to deciles 8 and 9 under the former socio-economic decile system).

== Academics ==
The college supports a wide range of cultural and sporting activities and students have gained many successes at regional and national levels. Academically, the school offers for senior years the National Certificate of Educational Achievement assessment system (NCEA).

In 2022, 73.3% per cent of all John Paul College leavers left having obtained NCEA Level 3. The level for Māori leavers from John Paul college was 80.00%. The national average for all leavers of all secondary schools was 52.8 per cent.

== College ==
John Paul College considers itself to be a Lasallian School whose mission is to form a Community where teachers and students can live their faith and become the persons that God wants them to be. "We believe that the love of Christ binds us together as children of God, peoples of all races and conditions, rich or poor, bright or otherwise, for all are made in God's Image and are members of His family. On this faith rests the mutual love and respect that is fostered between teacher and student in our Schools. We believe as lay colleagues to the De La Salle Brothers we give testimony to the Providence and Presence of God as we educate the young in the tradition of Saint Jean-Baptiste de La Salle, giving attention to all and especially to pupils whose development is hindered by economics, personal and other problems."^{[note a]}

The college sees itself as "a top performing state-integrated Catholic school" and as "the largest co-educational Catholic School in New Zealand". As "a Lasallian school in the Catholic tradition" it is "linked to other faiths through its network of similar schools and universities around the world." It promotes excellence in the academic, sporting and cultural spheres and has comprehensive systems of pastoral care and support to "ensure that each individual student can flourish to his or her fullest potential." Most of the school's classrooms have been rebuilt "over the last seven years." A gymnasium and performing arts centre have been recently built. WiFi is accessible in the classrooms to enable students to use their digital devices for learning. There is also a dedicated music suite with practice rooms and recording studio. The school has a large grass sports field and nine astro-turf courts for tennis, netball and hockey. There are many sporting facilities available in Rotorua for students' use.

On 12 February 2015, the Bishop Denis Browne, Emeritus Bishop of Hamilton, opened the eponymous "Denis Browne Centre" which is a state of the art technology building accommodating Woodwork, Metalwork, Art, Photography and Graphics.

== Houses ==
The John Paul College houses, colours and eponyms are:

| House | | Description | Notes |
| Colour | Name | Description | Notes |
|---|---|---|---|
| Yellow | Kanea | Kanea was the daughter of Mita Taupopoki, the distinguished leaders of Tuhourangi. Like her father, who was an astute man, Kanea had outstanding qualities of mind. All her life she practised the virtues of her Catholic faith. She was a role model for the young women of Te Arawa in the exemplary manner in which she lived her life. She was a descendant of Hinemoa and Tutanekai | |
| Purple | La Salle | Saint John Baptist de La Salle (1651–1719) was a prominent Catholic saint in France who made it his life's work to help improve the education of children. He founded an order known as the Brothers of the Christian Schools (now known as the De La Salle Brothers). He is the Patron Saint of Teachers and his feast day is 7 April. "In 1998, at the invitation of the Bishop, the association of the College with the De La Salle Brothers began with the establishment of a Brother's community." | |
| Blue | McKenna | Father Daniel McKenna was a Mill Hill Missionary born in the city of Limerick, Ireland on 6 December 1911. Educated in Ireland he moved to New Zealand after becoming a Priest on 9 July 1939. He was Parish priest of Saint Michael's from December 1951 until the creation of St Mary's Parish in 1954, when he became its first parish priest. He remained priest of this Parish for the next 30 years. He was instrumental in the creation of the Catholic primary schools and in establishing both McKillop College and Edmund Rice College. He died on 14 January 1983 | |
| Green | MacKillop | Mother Mary Helen MacKillop (15 January 1842 – 8 August 1909) also known as Saint Mary of the Cross, an Australian nun, who, together with Father Julian Tenison Woods, founded the Sisters of St Joseph of the Sacred Heart who founded Catholic education in Rotorua and who staffed MacKillop College | |
| Red | Rice | Edmund Ignatius Rice was the founder of the Christian Brothers in 1802. The order arrived in New Zealand in 1876 and they provided staff for Edmund Rice College for the 25 years of its existence and for John Paul College in its early years | |

== Principals ==
The following individuals have served as principals of the College:

| Ordinal | Officeholder | Term start | Term end | Time in office | Notes |
|---|---|---|---|---|---|
| 1 | Jack Griffith | 1986 | 1988 | 3 years | |
| 2 | Steve Robb | 1989 | 1995 | 7 years | |
| 3 | Bede Roughton | 1996 | 2002 | 7 years | |
| 4 | Patrick Walsh | 2003 | 2022 | 18–19 years | |
| 5 | Maree Stewart | 2022 | 2022 | (acting) 0.25 years | |
| 6 | Justin Harper | 2022 | present | 3–4 years | |

== Controversies ==
=== Allegations of racism ===
In 2021, the board of the college ordered an independent investigation following a complaint alleging "systemic racism", bullying and elitism at the school resulting in Māori whānau either withdrawing or choosing not to enrol at the college. The independent review ordered by the College found that the allegations were inconclusive to say whether their decision was "false or incorrect".

=== Physical violence at the college ===
A former teacher of the college who had a teaching career spanning 60 years was censured in 2017 by the Education Council's Disciplinary Tribunal. It is alleged that this teacher slapped a student in the face and shoved another in two separate outbursts of violence in the same year. Since then, this teacher has engaged in restorative justice with the students and their families. It is cited that the reasoning for these incidents was stress. This teacher later pleaded guilty to serious misconduct.

In another incident, violent attacks had been occurring in the College. Allegations of bullying and extreme violence had been made in the College in 2021 which was spread through social media to the local community. Parents of students who attend the College had made complaints about the violent behaviour of the students. Then principal of the College, Patrick Walsh, made a statement to the public about the College’s dedication to non-violence and its stance against bullying with videos of violent attacks in the school being more widely viewed by the community. Walsh then dismissed one of the surfaced videos as simply a "play fight" saying one of the videos had been recorded in 2019 however, no proof of this claim has been backed up and it believed that the videos had been films within months of each other. These events were happening amidst of an investigation into the college about the allegations of racism present in the school.

=== Animal abuse at the college ===
In July 2018, two members of John Paul College’s first XV rugby team came under fire for documented abuse of a bird at a party. The pair was seen hitting the bird, kicking it against a wall before promptly stomping its head until the bird is motionless then proceeding to pick the bird up and throwing it at a nearby wall all while being dressed in college uniform. The video was then uploaded to a snapchat story before finding its way to local media and the local SPCA. The Principal of the college at the time, Patrick Walsh, later made a statement saying, “The college is appalled and deeply saddened by their behaviour”.

After the incident occurred and after backlash from the public, the school’s board made the decision to exclude them from the college’s rugby team for three games. Other punishments included being ordered to make a large donation to the SPCA while offering voluntary services for three months.

== Antecedents ==
=== Sisters of St Joseph ===
In 1902, Mother Mary MacKillop, the founder of the Sisters of St Joseph of the Sacred Heart, went to Rotorua during the last of her four visits to New Zealand. Her doctors had suggested that she might find in the mineral waters some relief from the rheumatic condition that was progressively limiting her activities and causing her considerable distress. In the course of her treatment, on 11 May 1902, she suffered a severe stroke and she seemed near death. As soon as she was recovered sufficiently to be moved, Bishop Lenihan, the fifth Catholic Bishop of Auckland, arranged for her to be transported by rail to Auckland where she convalesced at the Remuera convent for the best part of a year. "It was evidently during her stay in Rotorua that Mother Mary MacKillop saw the great need for a Catholic school there, and set the arrangements in motion."

Father Kreijmborg, Mill Hill missionary priest, in 1902, built a school near the lake in St Michael's Parish and prepared a convent for the sisters who arrived the following year. By 1922 the School was proving inadequate for the number of children seeking admission. The decision was made to build a new school in Ranolf Street; St Joseph's School opened in 1924. The school included a secondary department. "[I]n 1954 the staffing levels at St Joseph's, Rotorua, had reached chronic levels. Class sizes were 57, 75, 78, 80 and 100. The educational impact was severe and struggling staff were advised by the Diocesan Director of Schools on how to 'ensure at least some people progress until staffing can be improved'." This led to the secondary section being closed in 1957, with the only available options for Rotorua Catholic families being at that time Rotorua Boys' High School, Rotorua Girls' High School or a boarding school outside Rotorua. There was a strong demand for Catholic secondary education in Rotorua in the late 1950s. Population growth had been high in the Bay of Plenty area, starting in 1950. This growth was contributed to by Forestry, farming and tourism developments. The population of Rotorua was under 10,000 in 1945 but reached 20,000 by 1963.

=== Edmund Rice College ===
In 1959, the seventh Catholic Bishop of Auckland, Archbishop Liston, made a request to the Christian Brothers (already established in the diocese at St Peter's College, Auckland) to establish a secondary school for boys in Rotorua.^{[note b]} In 1962 the Christian Brothers decided to go ahead with the Rotorua foundation. The site for the college already existed. In 1946, Catholic land-owner Patrick Keaney had bequeathed 4 acres 27 perches to the Parish of St Mary. In 1958 a further 10 acres 2 roods were purchased. The building of the school commenced in 1962. Edmund Rice College was officially opened in July 1963. On the first day, the college had a roll of 115 boys, of whom 25% were Māori.

"Edmund Rice College school bell rang for the first time in 1963 to the sounds of a construction site. Hammers punctuated English lessons and Maths was conducted as the building multiplies in size around the 115 founding students. It was a rugged start to Rotorua's first Catholic boys' college. The boys were pioneers. The facilities in the early days were very basic. The ovals were just farm fields, the buildings were not complete. Nonetheless, in its opening year the school field[s] sports teams, sent a contingent to Tauranga to meet the Queen and staged a musical. Parents took time off to develop the playing fields and roads. The opening year, 1963, was 201 years after the birth of the school's namesake and founder of the Christian Brothers, Edmund Ignatius Rice. Edmund Rice College was fully staffed by Christian Brothers when it opened but gradually lay teachers were employed as fewer Brothers became available. The college became a State-integrated school in 1983, as a Form 3–7 Secondary College with an attached intermediate School."

=== MacKillop College ===
MacKillop College (named after Mary MacKillop (St Mary of the Cross)) for girls was opened by the Sisters of St Joseph of the Sacred Heart on 14 February 1966, on a site adjoining Edmund Rice College, with a foundation roll of 146 girls in Forms I, II and III. The day began with an assembly at which Father D McKenna, parish priest of St Mary's, Rotorua, blessed the five rooms ready for immediate use and he blessed a crucifix for each room. Work had started building the college in 1965. The buildings were finally completed in 1975. MacKillop College was officially opened by Archbishop Liston on 8 May 1966. Difficulties in providing a wide range of subjects at senior level resulted in sharing classes with Edmund Rice College. This was convenient also because the two colleges were situated so closely to each other. In general, the girls went to Edmund Rice College for the science subjects while the boys took languages and biology at MacKillop College. "Integration brought an interesting situation. MacKillop was structured as a 'Form 1–7' school, while Edmund Rice was deemed to be a 'secondary school with an attached intermediate'. This meant teachers working [in] the Form 1 and 2 classes in each school were on different pay scales and the schools were staffed according to two different formulae. And this for schools which were about 200 metres apart!"

=== Amalgamation ===
The cost of upgrading the schools when they were integrated and the need to ensure that facilities were not duplicated led Bishop Gaines, the first Catholic Bishop of Hamilton, to decide to amalgamate the schools. The Education Department estimated the cost of upgrading Edmund Rice and MacKillop Colleges to meet integration requirements at $1.2 million. "The decision was surprisingly controversial, and the consultation process could have been done better. There was a feeling among some that the decision to amalgamate had been taken, and that any consultation was simply 'going through the motions'." "Bishop Gaines drove the change and it was his financial genius which pulled off the sale, and later the purchase back of [the] McKillop [College site], for a very healthy profit to the school. The funds from the initial sale enabled John Paul College to build and refurbish, to meet the needs of the growing numbers of students." The amalgamation was completed in May 1987 and Edmund Rice College and MacKillop College closed. Edmund Rice College was in its 25th year. The Christian Brothers Community was reduced to three, was relocated in rented accommodation nearby, and the Brothers former home became the administration centre of John Paul College. In May 1987, John Paul College opened its doors to 687 students. For a time the new school operated in both places, but the former Edmund Rice College was chosen for the new site because it had more potential for development. At the end of 1989 the Christian Brothers Community was withdrawn from Rotorua. The MacKillop buildings have produced rental income for the college.

=== Legacy ===
Sister Anne Marie Power R.S.J. has said that Mary MacKillop (St Mary of the Cross) "would have a smile of approval for this important educational venture which is doing so much for the Catholic youth of Rotorua – a place very dear to her heart for the care that was afforded her there in a time of failing health, and especially because it was she herself who initiated the founding of the first Catholic school in Rotorua."

=== Early staff ===
MacKillop College principals:

| Ordinal | Officeholder | Term start | Term end | Time in office | Notes |
|---|---|---|---|---|---|
| 1 | Sr Angela Gould | 1966 | 1967 | 2 years | |
| 2 | Sr Alphonsus Hogan | 1969 | 1971 | 3 years | |
| 3 | Sr Gertude McGowan | 1972 | 1983 | 12 years | |
| 4 | Jack Griffith | 1983 | 1987 | 5 years | |

Edmund Rice College principals:

| Ordinal | Officeholder | Term start | Term end | Time in office | Notes |
|---|---|---|---|---|---|
| 1 | Bro. Victor Antonine Sullivan, c.f.c. | 1963 | 1968 | 6 years | |
| 2 | Bro. Rex Anthony Sisson, c.f.c. | 1969 | 1975 | 7 years | |
| 3 | Bro. Michael Alwin Sheahan, c.f.c. | 1976 | 1981 | 6 years | |
| 4 | Bro. Norman Campion Gillies, c.f.c. | 1982 | 1987 | 6 years | |

== Notable alumni ==
- Mike Bush CNZM (born 1959 or 1960) – former New Zealand Commissioner of Police (Edmund Rice College)
- Cliff Curtis (born 1968) – international television and film star; has won three New Zealand Film and TV awards (Edmund Rice College)
- Toby Curtis KNZM (1939–2022) – educator and Māori leader (Sisters of Mercy at St Michael's school)
- Susan Devoy DNZM CBE (born 1964) – world champion squash player 1985, 1987, 1990 and 1992 (runner-up in 1989); New Zealand Race Relations Commissioner (2013–2018) (McKillop College)
- Theresa Gattung DNZM – former CEO of Telecom New Zealand (McKillop College)
- Jenna Hastings (born 2004) – mountain biker
- Moana Maniapoto MNZM (born 1961) – singer, songwriter, documentary maker, and media interviewer (McKillop College)
- Al Pitcher (Allan Geoffrey Pitcher) (born 1972) – stand-up comedian located in Sweden (Edmund Rice College and John Paul College)
- Kane Radford (born 1990) – New Zealand's first Olympic open water swimmer
- Clinton Roberts (born 1987) – New Zealand radio personality, The Edge FM
- Paige Satchell (born 1998) – New Zealand footballer, member of New Zealand team at the 2016 Summer Olympics
- Samantha Sinclair (born 1995) – New Zealand netball international

== Notable staff ==
- Coral Palmer – New Zealand netball international, represented her country on seven occasions including at the 1971 World Netball Championships; netball coach

== See also ==
- List of schools in New Zealand
- Education in New Zealand
- Catholic Church in New Zealand

== Notes ==
- ^a: "John Baptist De La Salle (1651–1719): In 1998, at the invitation of the Bishop, the association of the College with the De La Salle Brothers began with the establishment of a Brother's community. This association was formalised in 1999 with a request from the Board of trustees that John Paul College become a Lasallian Associated School. This association in no way lessens the contribution of the Christian Brothers or the Sisters of St Joseph of the Sacred Heart, but strengthens and consolidates the spirits given to the College by these two Congregations for all to come to know the mind and heart of Jesus."
- ^b: The diocese of Hamilton, in which Rotorua is located, was not established until 1981.

== Bibliography ==
- (Anderson) Hodder, Bridget, ed. (2004). 100 Years Catholic Education in Rotorua 1903–2003. Rotorua: St Mary's Catholic Primary School.
- (Anderson) Hodder, Bridget, ed. (2002). A history of John Paul College, Rotorua. Rotorua: St Mary's Catholic Primary School.
- Donaldson, Graeme (2001). To All Parts of the Kingdom: Christian Brothers In New Zealand 1876–2001. Christchurch: Christian Brothers New Zealand Province.
- O'Sullivan, Dominic; Piper, Cynthia, eds. (2005). Turanga nagatahi: Standing Together: The Catholic Diocese of Hamilton, 1840–2005. Dunmore Press for the Catholic Diocese of Hamilton.
- Power, Sister Anne Marie, R.S.J. (1997). Sisters of St Joseph of the Sacred Heart: New Zealand Story 1883–1997 (revised ed.). Auckland: Sisters of St Joseph of the Sacred Heart.
- Reid, Nicholas (2006). James Michael Liston: A Life. Wellington: Victoria University Press.
- Robertson, Paul Malcolm (1996). Nga Parata Karaitiana The Christian Brothers, A Public Culture in Transition, A Comparative Study of the Indian and New Zealand Provinces (unpublished thesis for MA in Anthropology). University of Auckland.
- Liston College 25th Jubilee 1975–2000. Waitakere City: Liston College. 2000.
- "Education Review Reports: John Paul College". Education Review Office.
