= ACG Senior College =

Coordinates: 36.8524°S 174.7652°E

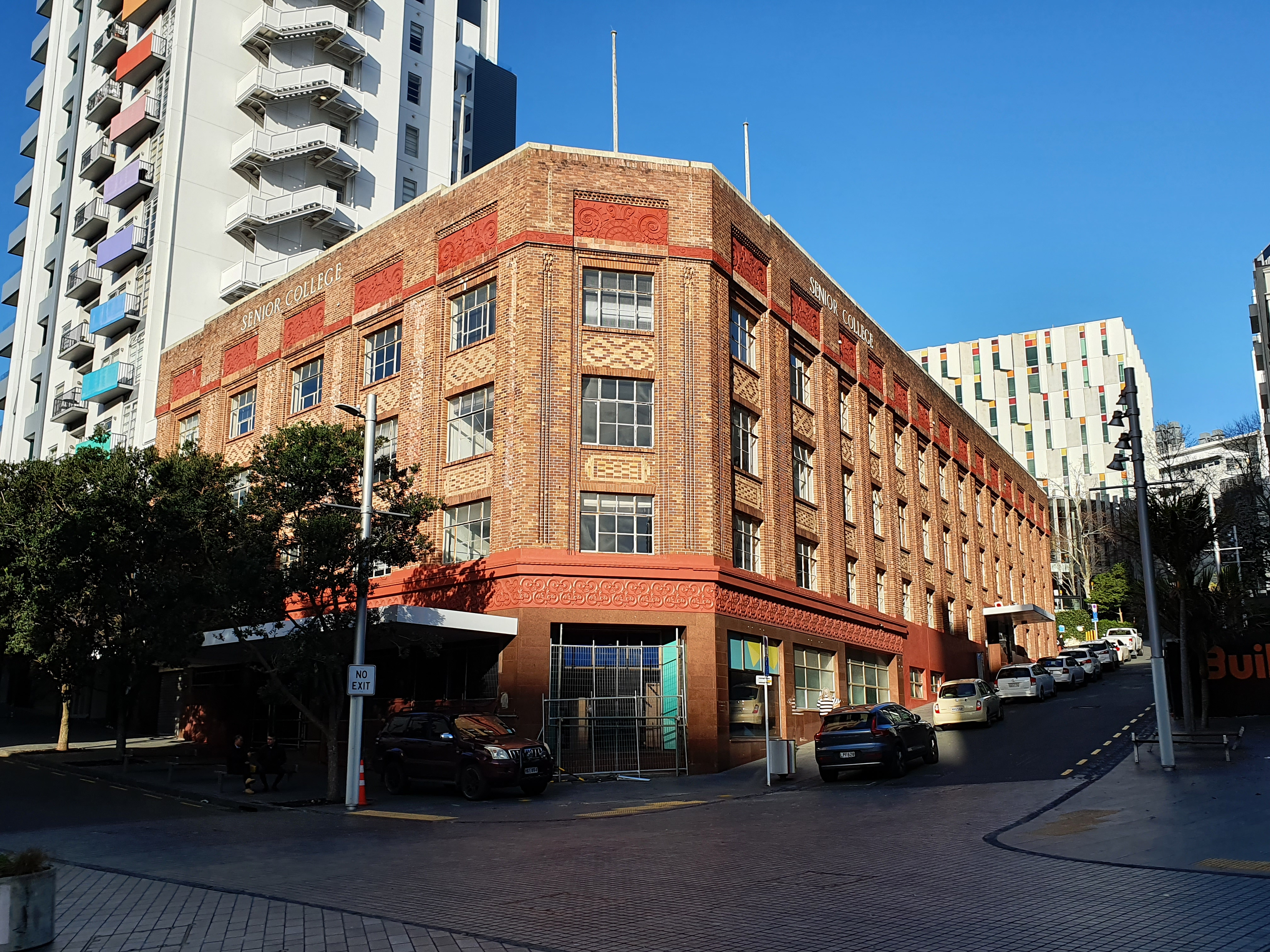

Location
- 66 Lorne Street, Central Auckland, New Zealand.

Information
- Type: Private Senior School
- Motto: Redefine Success
- Established: 1995–2018
- Principal: Tracey Dykstra
- Grades: 11–13
- Enrolment: 229 (1 July 2017)
- Socio-economic decile: 10
- Website: acgedu.com/nz/senior

ACG Senior College was a specialist, pre-university high school and part of ACG Education (formerly known as Academic Colleges Group) New Zealand. It was located in the learning quarter of central Auckland, opposite the Central Library and near AUT and the University of Auckland. In December 2018, Senior College merged with ACG Parnell College at the new Senior Campus in Newmarket.

== Education System ==
Although Senior College did originally offer the NCEA courses, the institution since switched to the full Cambridge International Examination system, and gained 34 Top in the World and Top in New Zealand Awards. Students could take courses at various levels such as IGCSE and AS and A, however they were only able to take senior school level courses (NZ years 11–13). In November 2013, ACG Senior College also became an IB World School. Students could take 6-month and 1-year Pre-IB programmes as well as the 2-year IB Diploma Programme (IBDP). Some students in Year 13 were at Senior College part-time and attended university courses at the University of Auckland simultaneously.

Each year, the college took a number of able students who wished to move from Year 9 directly into Year 11.

== History ==
The institution was opened in 1995 as Senior College of New Zealand and was often referred to as SCONZ. The founding Principal was Dawn Jones. Kathleen Parker was appointed in 2004. Larne Edmeades, principal of ACG Parnell College, was principal of Senior College for 2016, and on 1 November 2016, Tracey Dykstra was appointed as the last principal.

== Closure ==
In mid-2018, the school announced its merger with a school under the same company, ACG Parnell. This caused backlash from the students, parents, and staff. In 2019, ACG Senior College will be under ACG Parnell: Senior Campus, with a mix of ACG Parnell and ACG Senior students. The existing building of ACG Senior will be vacated.
