= ACG Tauranga =

Location
- 6 Keenan Rd; Pyes Pa; Tauranga; New Zealand; 37.774037°S 176.116173°E

Information
- Type: Private
- Established: January 2015
- Founder: Academic Colleges Group
- Ministry of Education Institution no.: 707
- Principal: Thea Kilian
- Years offered: preschool to Year 13
- Gender: coeducational
- Enrolment: 411 (July 2026)
- Campus size: 14 hectares (35 acres)
- Divisions: Junior School (Year 1–6); Middle School (Year 7–9); Senior School (Year 10–13)
- Website: https://tauranga.acgedu.com/

ACG Tauranga is a private coeducational day school located on the outskirts of Tauranga, New Zealand. The school is owned and operated by Auckland-based private education company ACG Schools (formerly known as Academic Colleges Group).

The school opened at the beginning of the 2015 school year, and initially offered places for Year 1–9 students. It now offers education from preschool to Year 13. It is the first private school in Tauranga since Tauranga Rudolf Steiner School integrated into the state system in March 2005. It is the latest of Academic Colleges Group's 10 schools, whose New Zealand schools are members of Independent Schools of New Zealand (ISNZ). Thea Kilian is the current principal, transferring from her role as Deputy Principal from Auckland's Long Bay College.

The school is currently owned and operated by Inspired Education Group, an international provider of for-profit schools.

== Background ==
The school was announced via press release from ACG in August, 2013. It is ACG's first domestic school outside of the Auckland region. Of ACG's existing domestic schools, ACG Tauranga is closest in nature to ACG Strathallan in Papakura, south of Auckland, which opened in 2001.

The development was initially opposed by the Tauranga City Council, however work was underway in February 2014. The school covers 14 hectares, formerly a kiwifruit orchard. Amenities will include a gymnasium, three sports fields, a utility building, and parking. As well as hard courts, a sports pavilion, horticultural building and an Early Childhood Education centre.

The first public meeting was held in April 2014 at Trinity Wharf Hotel in Tauranga. ACG claims over 200 parents and teachers attended from across the Bay of Plenty.'

In 2016, construction of the new three-storey gymnasium began. It was completed in May 2017.

== Curriculum ==
The curriculum is aligned closely to the Cambridge International programme.

As with all domestic ACG schools, ACG Tauranga offers the Cambridge International Examinations (CIE) instead of the National Certificate of Educational Achievement (NCEA). Its first cohort of Year 13 students achieved a 100% pass rate in all A Level subjects in 2019.

In 2023, ACG Tauranga celebrated academic excellence in the Cambridge Examinations with the school's first-ever ‘Top in World’ award (AS-Level Mathematics). The school also achieved 100% A-Level pass rate and Y13 university entrance.

== Schools ==
The school is divided into Junior (Year 1–6), Middle (Year 7–9) and Senior (Year 10–13) Schools. It also has a preschool.

== See also ==
- Bethlehem College
- Aquinas College
- ACG Strathallan
