= ACG Sunderland School and College =

Location
- 6 Waipareira Avenue, Henderson, Waitakere City; 36.863717°S 174.63335°E

Information
- Type: Private co-educational school
- Motto: Aspire • Succeed • Respect
- Established: 2007
- Ministry of Education Institution no.: 571
- Principal: Nathan Villars
- Grades: Preschool to Year 13
- Enrolment: 886 (July 2026)
- Socio-economic decile: 10Z
- Website: sunderland.acgedu.com

ACG Sunderland is a private school and is part of ACG Education (formerly known as Academic Colleges Group). It is located in Henderson, New Zealand, a western suburb of Auckland.

The school is owned and operated by Inspired Education Group, an international operator of for-profit schools.

== History ==
The Sunderland Education Trust founded Sunderland in 2007 as "Sunderland School and College". It was the first private secondary school to open in Waitakere City (modern West Auckland), opening at the former site of the Waitakere City Council buildings. In 2010, Academic Colleges Group (ACG) took over the management contract for Sunderland, changing the name to ACG Sunderland.

== Student body ==
ACG Sunderland provides education to boys and girls from Years 1 to 13, as well as a preschool. The student body is split into six houses, named after four founders of the school and two places in Auckland: Waitakere, Whenuapai, Tong, Fleming, Findlay, and McDonald.

As a private school, ACG Sunderland charges tuition fees to cover costs. For the 2026 school year, tuition fees for New Zealand residents are $19,935 per year for students in years 1 and 2, $21,460 per year for students in Years 3 to 6, $23,695 per year for students in years 7 and 8, $26,120 per year for students in years 9 and 10, and $26,630 per year for students in Year 11 and above.

As of July 2026, ACG Sunderland has roll of 886 students, of which 10 (1.1%) identify as Māori. As a private school, the school is not assigned an Equity Index.

== Curriculum ==
ACG Sunderland offers the University of Cambridge International Examinations (CIE) and is a member of the Association of Cambridge Schools in New Zealand. The CIE curriculum has students sit external Cambridge examinations during the October–November months of each year.

== Campus ==
ACG Sunderland's campus is on nine acres of landscaped grounds and includes a 150-seat auditorium.

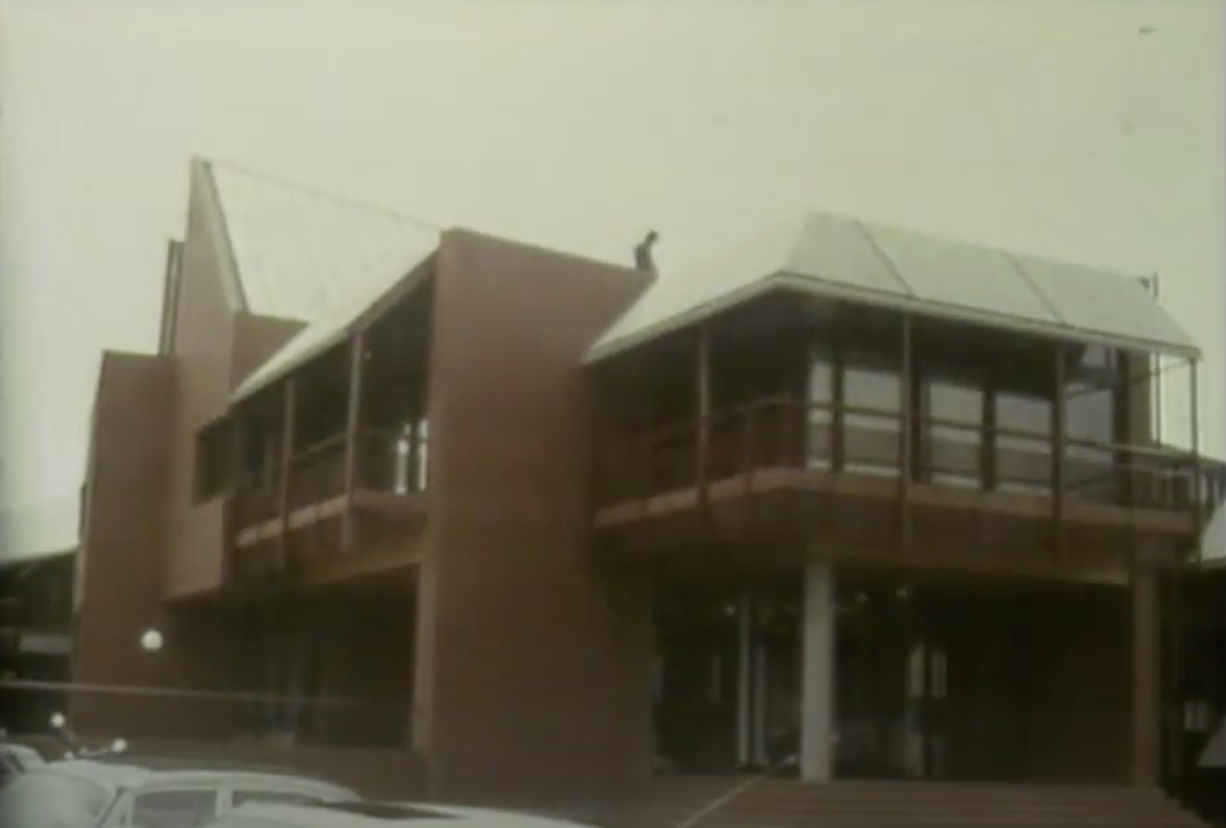
The premises in 1983, when it was the Waitakere City Council Chambers
