= ACG International School Vietnam =

Coordinates: 10.7897°N 106.7499°E

Location
- East-West Highway / An Phu Ward / District 2 / Ho Chi Minh City

Information
- Type: Private, selective, international (Years 1-13) school
- Established: 2006
- Closed: 2013 (merged into Australian International School, Vietnam)
- Website: acgedu.com/vn

ACG International School is an international school in Ho Chi Minh City, Vietnam. The school was established in 2006, and is a school for children from 3 to 18 years of age. It is owned by the Academic Colleges Group based in New Zealand. The Group owns a total of 10 schools across New Zealand, Indonesia and Vietnam. ACG International School is located in District 2 of Ho Chi Minh City, in Vietnam.

ACG International School Vietnam has been an IB World School since June 2011

From 1 July 2013, ACG International School Vietnam merged into the Australian International School, Vietnam, taking the new name Australian International School.

The school is currently owned and operated by Inspired Education Group, the leading global group of premium schools operating in Europe, Asia-Pacific, Africa, the Middle East, South and Latin America.

== Curriculum ==
In 2012, ACG International School had over 550 students enrolled at the School, from 30 different nationalities. ACG International School followed the International Baccalaureate (IB) Primary Years Programme (PYP) in the Kindergarten and Primary School. In the Middle School, the University of Cambridge International Lower Secondary programme is delivered, leading to the IGCSE examinations in Year 11. In the Senior School, students follow the International Baccalaureate Diploma Programme (IBDP).

== Facilities ==
The School campus is 1.9ha in size and consists of Biology, Chemistry and Physics laboratories; Art, Design and Technology specialist rooms; Computer laboratories and a campus-wide WiFi network; Music (Keyboard Lab and Practice Rooms); a library with internet-based research facilities; an auditorium and media centre; a gymnasium, covered tennis court, swimming pools and an outdoor grass football field. The Head of School until the merger was Mr John Burns.

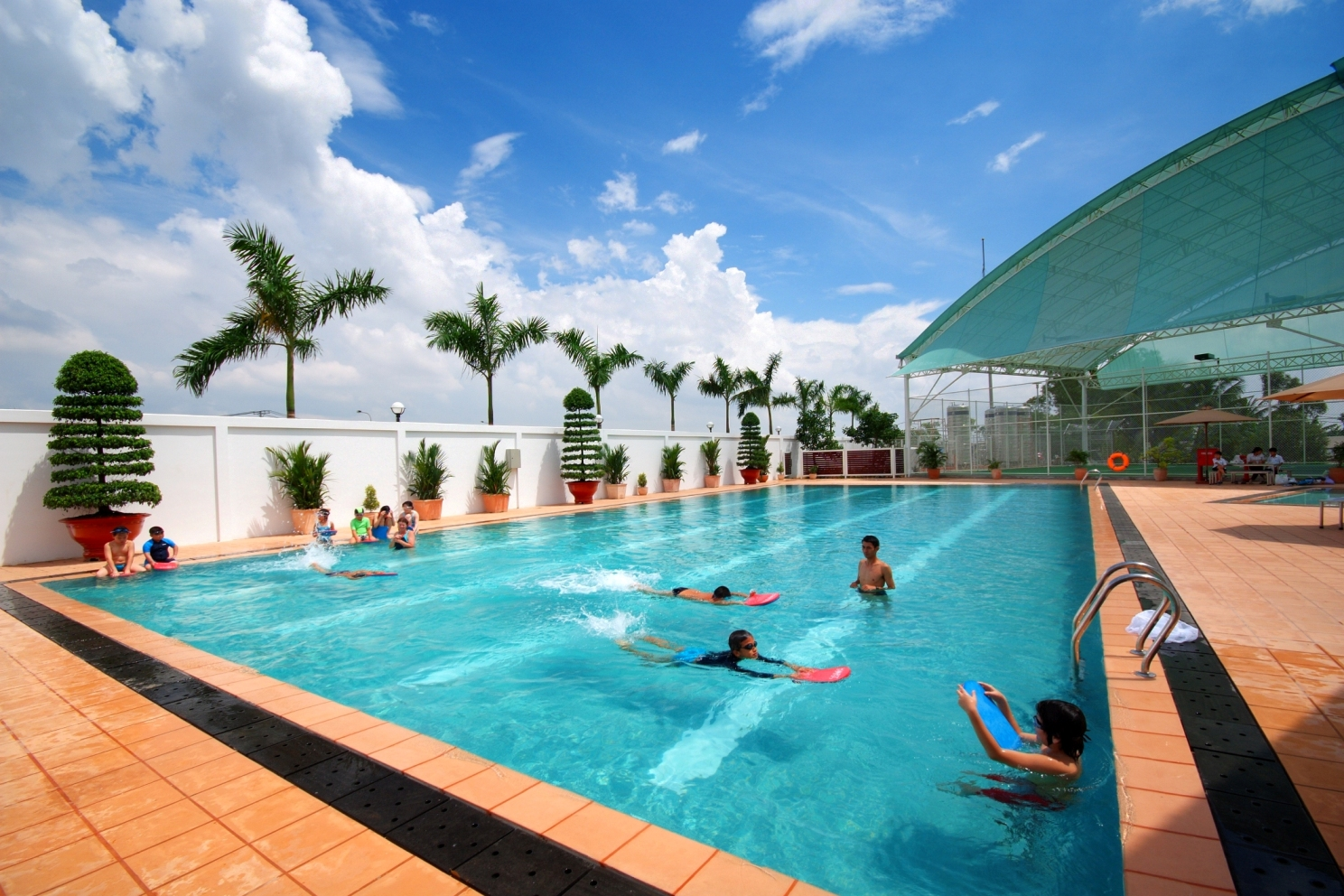
Salt water swimming pool
