= Rowberry =

Family name

Rowberry is a locative surname from a place name deriving from the Middle English rou, row(e) Old English ruh, meaning "rough or wild" and Middle English bergh(e), berwe Old English beorg meaning "hill".

It has several extant variations, the two most common variants found today are Rowberry itself together with Rubery, closely followed by Rowbury and Ruberry. Others still found today include Rewbury, Robery, Roebury, Rovery, Rowbery, Rowbory, Rowbree, Rowbrey, Rowburrey, Rubbery, Rubbra, Rubra, Rubrey and Rubury.

The name has its origins in a small place in the parish of Bodenham, Herefordshire nowadays represented by the farm named "Rowberry Court".

There is a Rowberry One-Name Study researching the name and its variants.

== People ==
- Anna Rowberry, the New Zealand netballer
- Brenda Rowberry, former netball player from New Zealand
- Dave Rowberry was a keyboard player with The Animals
- Linda Rowberry is the real name of Linda Strawberry the American singer
- Shannon Rowbury (a.k.a. Shannon Gregg-Rowbury) is a 2008 U.S. Olympian & 2009 World Bronze Medalist in the Track & Field Women's 1500m race.
