= UP International College Auckland =

ACG New Zealand International College
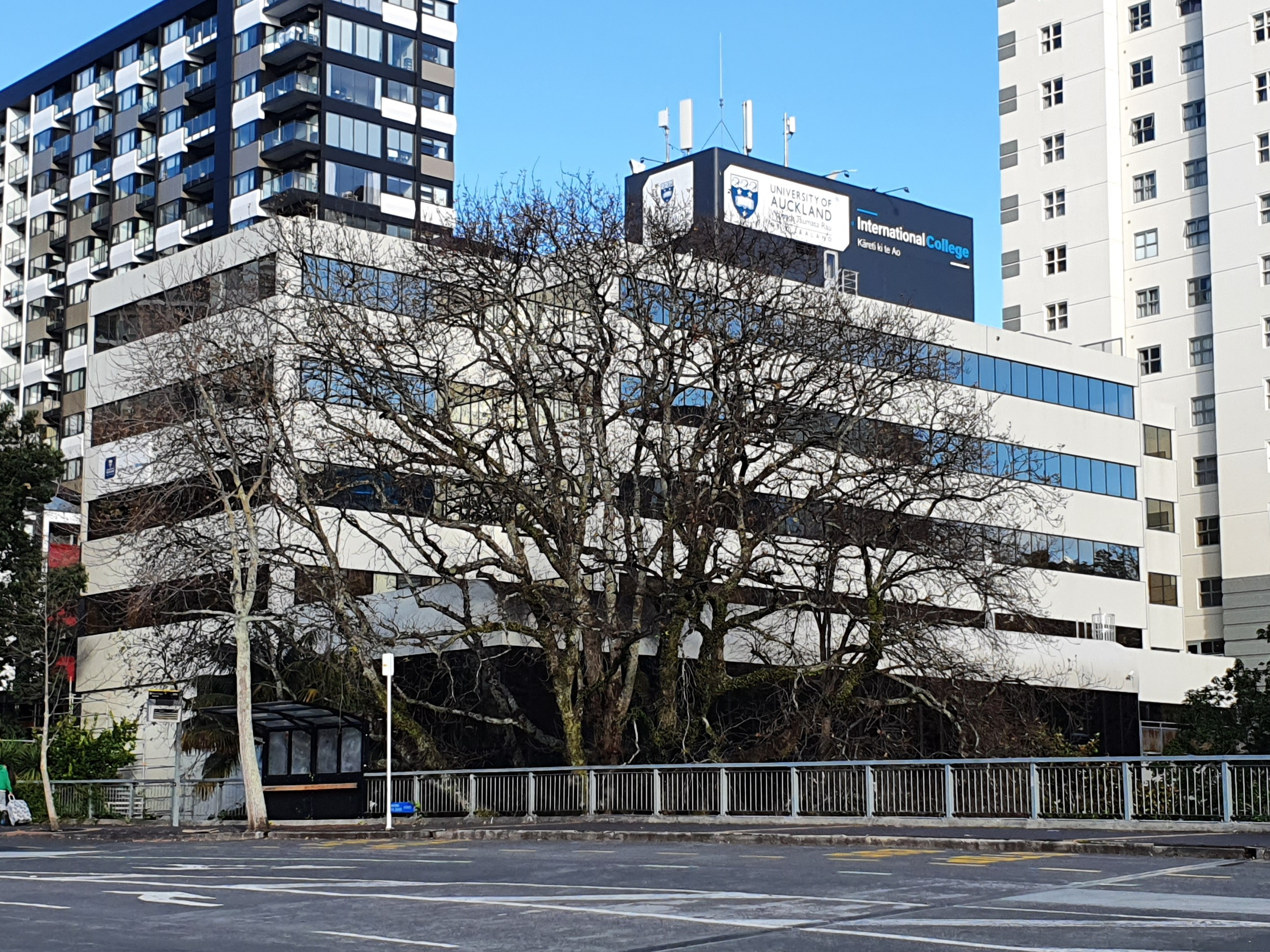

Location
- 345 Queen Street, Central Auckland, New Zealand; 36.854451°S 174.762604°E

Information
- Type: Private School, Secondary (Year 9–15)
- Established: 2005
- Ministry of Education Institution no.: 1606
- Principal: Mr Mark Haines
- Enrolment: 159 (July 2026)
- Website: www.acgedu.com/nz/nzic

ACG New Zealand International College (ACG NZIC) is a private school, owned by the Academic Colleges Group New Zealand. The school's curriculum provides pathways to tertiary study for international students. It has premises in Auckland City, in the central business district. The school has been restructured since the 2005 ERO review as part of an endeavour to provide better tuition for international students.

== The University of Auckland Foundation programme ==
The University of Auckland Foundation programme have been developed for international students and students whose first language is not English, to offer preparation for bachelor's degree study.

The Foundation programme is taught on behalf of the University by the [Academic Colleges Group]. Foundation study usually takes a year, although accelerated six month programmes are available to suitably qualified students. The Foundation programme is designed to develop skills in:

- The style of study at university
- Critical and independent thinking
- Computer use and research
- Essential subject knowledge. For example, in accounting, calculus, chemistry, computer science, design, economics, English, geography, physics and statistics.

=== Requirements ===
Entry to undergraduate degree programmes at The University of Auckland will depend on achieving:

- A set academic mark
- English language proficiency at a level equivalent to the International English Language Testing System (IELTS) of at least 6.0 overall (with no single band below 5.5), and
- Meeting any additional programme entry requirements for International Students, such as interviews, auditions or portfolios

== The University of Auckland Certificate in Foundation Studies programme ==
The ACG NZIC offers The University of Auckland Certificate in Foundation Studies programme, accredited by the New Zealand Vice-Chancellors' Committee. In addition at the inner city campus the ACG English School, a division of ACG NZIC, has the primary objective of improving students' English in preparation for IELTS examinations and future study. The courses offered by ACG International College have NZQA accreditation. The University of Auckland Certificate of Foundation Studies belongs to the University of Auckland and is delivered by ACG New Zealand International College. Successful completion of the Certificate in Foundation Studies guarantees entry into The University of Auckland and is accepted by all New Zealand universities.

== Student achievement ==
Student achievement is monitored by examinations set by ACG staff and moderated by The University of Auckland personnel.

== Pastoral care ==
The pastoral care of students is a feature of ACG NZIC. The college emphasises the importance of students being happy in both their classes and homes so that they progress well academically. Student attendance is closely monitored. The deans and group tutors provide academic and social support for students and promote their personal well being.

== Use of ICT ==
The use of information and communication technologies (ICT) is a feature of the college. Teachers make use of ICT to facilitate teaching and learning and to provide learning resources.

ACG NZIC provides equipment that enhances student learning. Staff and students have access to computers.
