= Te Aratai College =

Location
- 85 Aldwins Road; Phillipstown, Christchurch 8062; New Zealand; 43.5386°S 172.6673°E

Information
- Former name: Linwood College; Linwood High School
- Type: State
- Motto: Kimihia: to seek: in pursuit of excellence
- Established: 1954
- Ministry of Education Institution no.: 337
- Principal: Maria Lemalie
- Years offered: 7–13
- Enrolment: 1,260 (July 2026)
- Socio-economic decile: 3H
- Website: tearatai.school.nz

Te Aratai College (founded as Linwood High School, then renamed Linwood College from 2000–2021) is a co-educational secondary school in Linwood, a suburb of Christchurch, New Zealand.

== History ==
Founded in the early 1950s to cater for the secondary educational needs of a growing population in eastern Christchurch, Linwood High School became one of New Zealand's larger secondary schools during the 1970s, with a roll of over 1600 pupils at one point.

Following the introduction of the 1989 Tomorrow's Schools policy, the role declined from about 1500, in 1990, to 775, in 2000. Much of this decline was attributed to the relaxation of school zoning restrictions and the resulting white flight by affluent families within the large south-eastern Christchurch catchment area sending their children to higher decile schools, that had a better academic reputation.

In 1975 the school began to take in deaf students from Van Asch College.

With the appointment of a new principal, Rob Burrough, in 2000, the school undertook a rebranding exercise, changing the name from High School to College, and, consulting with both students and the community, rethought how it taught students. By 2004 the roll had climbed to 1080, academic results were above the New Zealand average and sports participation had noticeably increased.

In 2010, principal Rob Burrough resigned to take up a head-teacher post in Mombasa, Kenya. In 2015, Richard Edmundson was appointed principal. Since his appointment he has overseen the rebuild of the Linwood College campus as well as the introduction of a new enrolment scheme in 2020.

=== 2010–11 earthquakes ===
Linwood College suffered the loss of a Year 11 student in the February 2011 Christchurch earthquake. School buildings sustained moderate damage in the quake and the college was forced to site-share with Cashmere High School while repairs were undertaken at the Linwood site. Staff and students returned to the Linwood campus in August 2011.

Due to the earthquake damage, the college was demolished in 2019 and moved to the old location of Avonside Girls' High School. A new college was rebuilt under the Greater Christchurch Education Renewal Property Programme and opened in 2022, at cost of $44 million. It was originally scheduled to reopen in 2018.

=== 2022 Te Aratai College ===
In 2022, with the completion of the rebuild of its campus, Linwood College was renamed Te Aratai College, which means "pathway to the sea." The name was gifted by Te Ngāi Tūāhuriri Rūnanga. With the rebuild and introduction of new zoning, the college is anticipated to grow to 1800 students over the next ten years.

In August 2022, Te Aratai College attracted domestic media attention after the criminal white supremacist Philip Arps unsuccessfully nominated himself for a position on the school's Board of Trustees. In 2019 Arps had shared footage of the Christchurch mosque shooting and been sentenced to 21 months in jail, less than the 24 months which automatically excluded Board candidates. He received 25 votes (2.6 percent), the lowest total of any candidate. His nomination led to Christchurch City councillor Sarah Templeton, Secondary Principals' Association president Vaughan Couillault, and retired Labour Party Member of Parliament Liz Gordon calling for legislative changes to ensure that extremists were not elected to school boards. In 2023 the Education and Training Act was amended to bar people with certain criminal convictions from serving on school boards (unless exempted by the Secretary of Education).

== Enrolment ==
At 1 July 2021, Te Aratai College had 754 students enrolled, of which 56% were male and 44% were female. By prioritised ethnicity, 34% of students identified as Māori, 20% as Asian, 9% as Pasifika, 1% as another minority ethnicity, and 35% as European.

As of July 2026, Te Aratai College has roll of 1,260 students, of which 350 (27.8%) identify as Māori.

Te Ara Tai College has struggled to have regular attendance from students with attendance as low as 29%

As of 2026, the school has an Equity Index of 507, placing it amongst schools whose students have many socioeconomic barriers to achievement (roughly equivalent to deciles 2 and 3 under the former socio-economic decile system).

== Notable staff ==
Former teaching staff include:

- Paul Ackerley – Olympic gold medalist, Hockey, 1976
- Chris Arthur – Former New Zealand Black Stick
- John Graham – All Black
- Brenda Rowberry – Former Silver Fern

== Notable alumni ==
- Kees Bruin – painter
- Sir Kerry Burke – local body politician
- Guy Cotter – mountaineer & CEO of Adventure Consultants
- Tony Fomison – a notable New Zealand artist
- Mike Hosking – TV and radio presenter
- April Ieremia – former Silver Fern and television presenter
- Rodney Latham – New Zealand cricketer
- Saskia Leek – a New Zealand painter
- Rodney Macann – opera singer
- Max Merritt – singer/songwriter
- Dick Motz – a notable New Zealand cricketer
- Matthew Palmer – Justice of the High Court of New Zealand
- Ann Rankin – teacher & member of the New Zealand national netball team that won the 1967 world cup
- Paul Reid – Actor on Shortland street, Singer Songwriter for Rubicon, Real estate investor
- Scribe – rap artist
- Anna Simcic-Forrest – swimmer, Commonwealth Games gold medallist
- Llew Summers – a sculptor based in Christchurch
- Tiki Taane – singer/songwriter; former lead singer of Salmonella Dub
- Brent Todd – rugby league player
- Kevin Trenberth – USA based climate change scientist
