= ACG School Jakarta =

Location
- Jl. Warung Jati Barat Jl. Taman Margasatwa Raya No.19 10, RT.10/RW.5, Jati Padang, Ps. Minggu, Kota Jakarta Selatan, Daerah Khusus Ibukota Jakarta 12540; Pasar Minggu, South Jakarta, Jakarta, Indonesia; South Jakarta; Jakarta, Indonesia, Jakarta, 12540; Indonesia
- Coordinates: 6.2902°S 106.8248°E

Information
- School type: Private, selective, international (Kindergarten - Year 13) school Private School
- Motto: Educate, Create, Innovate
- Established: 2004
- Principal: Myles D'Airelle
- Grades: K-13
- Primary years taught: 1 - 6
- Secondary years taught: 7 - 13
- Age range: 3-19
- Enrollment: 300 (2025)
- Average class size: 20
- Student to teacher ratio: 1:15
- Language: English, Indonesia
- Website: https://www.jakarta.acgedu.com/

ACG School Jakarta is an independent co-educational international school in South Jakarta, Indonesia. The school was established in 2004, and is a school for children from 3 to 17 years of age. Currently it has 300 students from 35 different nationalities and is part of the family of ACG Schools based in New Zealand.

The school is currently owned and operated by Inspired Education Group, an international provider of for-profit schools.

== History ==
ACG School Jakarta was founded in 2004 and has grown rapidly. Since May 2010 ACG School Jakarta has been an IB World School and offers the IB Primary Years Programme (PYP). From August 2017 ACG School Jakarta also be offering the IB Diploma Programme (IBDP).

== Campus ==
A new purpose built campus was opened in 2012 to provide quality educational facilities for the roll of 500 students,. The new buildings include 24 new classrooms as well as 2 science laboratories, a technology centre, music and arts rooms and a large modern canteen complete with a multi-purpose sports centre and auditorium.

Sports facilities include a swimming pool, a multi-purpose gymnasium, paddle courts, a multi-sports covered court and a junior soccer field, providing numerous sporting and recreational opportunities for students across all levels.

== Curriculum ==
Since May 2010 the ACG School Jakarta has been authorised to offer the IB Primary Years Programme for students aged 3–11. This programme is taught in English and is open for male and female students.

ACG School Jakarta offers the University of Cambridge International Examinations (CIE), which is the world largest provider of international education programmes and qualifications for 5–19 year olds. Beginning in Year 7, the students sit the Checkpoint examinations at the end of Year 9 and then enter for International General Certificate of Secondary Education (IGCSE) at the end of Year 11.

For Y12 and Y13 students at ACG School Jakarta, from August 2017 the school will transition from the CIE AS and A Level examinations to the IB Diploma Programme.
