= Sandra Richards =

New Zealand netball player

Personal information
- Full name: (Née: Norman)
- Born: 8 March 1949 New Zealand
- Died: 3 June 2005 (Aged 56)
- Height: 1.68 m (5 ft 6 in)

Netball career
- Playing positions: GS, GA
Years	National team	Caps
1970-71	New Zealand	4
Medal record
Representing New Zealand
Netball World Cup
Silver medal – second place	1971 Kingston, Jamaica	Tournament

Sandra Richards (1949—2005) was a netball player from the Christchurch area of New Zealand's South Island, who played on four occasions for New Zealand, winning a silver medal in the 1971 world championships.

== Netball career ==
Sandra (Sandy) Richards (née Norman) was born on 8 March 1949. A member of the Canterbury region netball team on New Zealand's South Island, she was chosen to play for the Silver Ferns, the New Zealand national netball team, in 1970. Playing as Sandra Norman, her first match was against Singapore on 3 November 1970, en route to the 1971 world championships, which were held in Kingston, Jamaica at the end of 1970 and beginning of 1971. New Zealand came second in the championships, losing 48–42 to Australia. Richards played in the Goal shooter (GS) and Goal attack (GA) positions.

== Death ==
Richards died on 3 June 2005. A trophy awarded annually to its "Most Outstanding Senior Player" by the Belfast Netball Club, in the suburbs of Christchurch, is in Richards' name.
