= Samantha Winders =

New Zealand netball international

Personal information
- Full name: Samantha Winders (Née: Sinclair)
- Born: June 5, 1995 (age 31) Rotorua, New Zealand
- Height: 1.71 m (5 ft 7 in)
- School: John Paul College, Rotorua
- University: University of Waikato

Netball career
- Playing positions: C, WA, WD
Years	Club team	Apps
2014–2022	Waikato Bay of Plenty Magic	123
2022– 2023	Southern Steel	30
2024	Giants Netball	12
Years	National team	Caps
2017–	New Zealand	47
Medal record
Representing New Zealand
Fast5 Netball World Series
Gold medal – first place	2016 Melbourne	Team
Bronze medal – third place	2022 Christchurch	Team

Samantha Winders (born 5 June 1995), previously known as Samantha Sinclair, is a New Zealand netball international. She represented New Zealand at the 2018 Commonwealth Games and was a prominent member of the New Zealand team that won the 2021 Constellation Cup. She captained New Zealand for the third test against England during the 2021 Taini Jamison Trophy Series. She was subsequently named the 2021 Silver Fern Player of the Year. Between 2014 and 2022, she played for Waikato Bay of Plenty Magic, initially in the ANZ Championship and later in the ANZ Premiership. Between 2020 and 2022, she served as Magic captain.

== Early life, family and education ==
Sinclair was born and raised in Rotorua. She is the daughter of Jamie and Justine Sinclair. Between 2007 and 2013 she attended John Paul College, Rotorua, where she was deputy head girl. Between 2014 and 2017 she attended the University of Waikato on a scholarship and subsequently became a Bachelor of Management Studies. In 2019, Sinclair married Josef Winders, a fellow University of Waikato alumni and a BMX rider who has represented New Zealand.

== Playing career ==
=== Early years ===
Sinclair represented John Paul College in national secondary schools tournaments. Her school coaches included Coral Palmer, a former a New Zealand netball international. She also represented Bay of Plenty in the Lois Muir Challenge tournament.

=== Waikato Bay of Plenty Magic ===
Between 2014 and 2022, Winders made 123 senior appearances for Waikato Bay of Plenty Magic, initially in the ANZ Championship and later in the ANZ Premiership. As Samantha Sinclair, she first attracted the attention of Magic while still attending John Paul College. She began training with Magic in 2011. She attended trials for the 2013 season but was not offered a contract until the 2014 season. In both 2013 and 2014, she was a member of the Waikato Bay of Plenty teams that won Netball New Zealand's national under-23 tournament. She made her senior debut for Magic on 1 March 2014 in a Round 1 70–46 win against Mainland Tactix, coming on at centre to replace Courtney Tairi for the fourth quarter. In 2015 and 2016, she was a member of the Magic teams that won the New Zealand Conference. Between 2020 and 2022, Winders served as Magic captain. On 30 May 2021, Winders made her 100th senior league appearance in a match against Central Pulse.

=== Southern Steel ===
In July 2022, it was announced that Winders would be joining Southern Steel for the 2023 ANZ Premiership season.

=== New Zealand ===
Between 2011 and 2013, Sinclair represented New Zealand at schoolgirl level, playing in three Trans-Tasman Secondary Schools Netball Tournaments. In 2013, together with Jamie-Lee Price, she co-captained the New Zealand team that won the tournament.

In June 2015, Sinclair was called up for trials for the senior New Zealand team. She was a member of the New Zealand team that won the 2016 Fast5 Netball World Series. In November 2016 she was included in the senior New Zealand for the first time. Sinclair made her senior debut for New Zealand on 28 January 2017 against Australia during a 2017 Netball Quad Series match. She went on to represent New Zealand at the 2018 Commonwealth Games.

After missing out on several tournaments, including the 2019 Netball World Cup, Sinclair, now Winders, was recalled for the 2020 Taini Jamison Trophy Series. She was a prominent member of the New Zealand team that won the 2021 Constellation Cup. On 24 September 2021, Winders captained New Zealand for the third test against England during the 2021 Taini Jamison Trophy Series. She was subsequently named the 2021 Silver Fern Player of the Year. However, she was left out of the team for the 2022 Commonwealth Games

Tournaments	Place
2016 Fast5 Netball World Series	1st place, gold medalist(s)
2017 Netball Quad Series (January/February)	2nd place, silver medalist(s)
2017 Netball Quad Series (August/September)	2nd place, silver medalist(s)
2017 Constellation Cup	2nd place, silver medalist(s)
2018 Netball Quad Series (January)	3rd
2018 Taini Jamison Trophy Series	2nd
2018 Commonwealth Games	4th
2018 Netball Quad Series (September)	3rd
2018 Constellation Cup	2nd place, silver medalist(s)
2019 Netball Quad Series	3rd
2020 Taini Jamison Trophy Series	1st place, gold medalist(s)
2021 Constellation Cup	1st place, gold medalist(s)
2021 Taini Jamison Trophy Series	2nd place, silver medalist(s)
2022 Netball Quad Series	3rd
2022 Fast5 Netball World Series	3rd place, bronze medalist(s)

== Honours ==
New Zealand

- Constellation Cup
  - Winners: 2021
- Taini Jamison Trophy
  - Winners: 2020
- Fast5 Netball World Series
  - Winners: 2016

Waikato Bay of Plenty Magic

- ANZ Championship – New Zealand Conference
  - Winners: 2015, 2016

Individual Awards

Year	Award
2021	Silver Ferns Player of the Year
