= Frances Webster (netball) =

New Zealand netball player

Personal information
- Full name: Née: Wiringi
- Born: 1 January 1947 (age 79)
- Height: 1.80 m (5 ft 11 in)

Netball career
- Playing positions: GS, GA, WA
Years	National team	Caps
1969-71	New Zealand	9
Medal record
Representing New Zealand
Netball World Cup
Silver medal – second place	1971 Kingston, Jamaica	Tournament

Frances Webster (born 1947) was a netball player who played 9 times for the New Zealand national netball team.

Frances Paranihia Webster (née Wiringi) was born on 1 January 1947. She was a track and field athlete and played netball for Rotorua. As Frances Wiringi, she was first picked for the national netball team, known as the Silver Ferns, in 1969, making her debut against Australia in June of that year, when she became the 47th woman to play for the team. She was part of the team that competed in the 1971 World Netball Championships when New Zealand came second. She played in the Goal Shooter (GS), Goal attack (GA) and Wing attack (WA) positions. In 1974, Webster left New Zealand and moved to Queensland in Australia.
