= Nancy King (netball) =

New Zealand netball player

Nancy King was a netball player from New Zealand who played for her country on 12 occasions, including in the 1971 World Netball Championships. More recently, she has worked in New Zealand and Australia, and has been a human rights and social justice advocate.

== Early life ==
Nancy King (née Carroll) came from Makarewa, a small community north of Invercargill in the south of New Zealand's South Island. She attended Makarewa School from 1949 until 1955 before moving to Southland Girls' High School in Invercargill until 1958.

== Netball career ==
King played netball for her school but was allowed to reserve Saturdays to play for the Makarewa Club. She was selected to play for the Southland region in 1956, at the age of 15. In the mid-1960s she moved to Australia and was selected to play for New South Wales between 1965 and 1967. Returning to New Zealand, she played for the Wellington club in 1968 and 1969. She had the distinction of playing for both the North Island and the South Island and captaining them both. In 1969 she was selected to play for the New Zealand national netball team, first in matches against Australia and then in the 1971 World Netball Championships. New Zealand came second to Australia.

== Later life ==
King worked in both New Zealand and Australia as a communications training expert. She worked for the Australian Associated Press and also lived briefly in Mexico City. She obtained a diploma in teaching and learning from the Christchurch College of Education (now part of the University of Canterbury) and a master's from the same college in 2005. In 2009 she was awarded a master's in peace and conflict studies from the University of Sydney. King has been a Liturgical Assistant at Christchurch Cathedral, a TV panellist, and a community radio broadcaster. She has also been active with organizations concerned with human rights and social justice. Between 2011 and 2013 she worked in Darwin in Australia's Northern Territory on government relations.

== Personal life ==
King married Terry King. They had three children.
