= Coral Palmer =

New Zealand netball player and coach

Personal information
- Born: 13 July 1942 (age 84)
- Height: 1.70 m (5 ft 7 in)

Netball career
- Playing position: C
Years	National team	Caps
1970-71	New Zealand	7
Medal record
Representing New Zealand
Netball World Cup
Silver medal – second place	1971 Kingston	Tournament

Coral Palmer was a New Zealand netball player who represented her country on seven occasions, including in the 1971 world championships. She later became a netball coach.

== Playing career ==
Coral Palmer was born on 13 July 1942. She played netball for Rotorua in the Centre court (C) position. She became the 50th player to represent the Silver Ferns, the New Zealand national netball team, first playing against Singapore in November 1970, at the beginning of a long tour by the team that included the 1971 World Netball Championships, which were held in Kingston, Jamaica in January. Coached by Taini Jamison, the Silver Ferns were runners-up in the tournament, losing to Australia in a match that Palmer missed due to illness.

== Coaching career ==
Palmer later became a coach. She was a coach at John Paul College, Rotorua. Among the players she taught was Samantha Winders who first played for the Silver Ferns in 2017 and had played 44 games for the team by early 2021. In 2013, during Winders' time at the College, the school achieved its first appearance at the New Zealand Secondary Schools tournament, finishing in fifth place.
