= Lorraine Mair =

New Zealand netball player

Personal information
- Full name: Née: Murphy
- Born: Lower Hutt
- Height: 1.75 m (5 ft 9 in)

Netball career
- Playing positions: GK, WD, GD
Years	National team	Caps
1970-71	New Zealand	2
Medal record
Representing New Zealand
Netball World Cup
Silver medal – second place	1971 Kingston, Jamaica	Tournament

Lorraine Mair is a former netball player who was part of the New Zealand team, known as the Silver Ferns, which came second in the 1971 Netball World Championships in Kingston, Jamaica in 1970–71.

== Netball career ==
Lorraine Mair (née Murphy) played her first match for the Silver Ferns en route to Jamaica, in Barbados on 18 December 1970, but was little used during the world championships. She was the 51st woman to play for the Silver Ferns. Mair played in the Goal keeper (GK) position as well as Goal defence (GD) and Wing defence (WD).

In October 2018, Mair tossed the coin at the beginning of the Constellation Cup netball match between Australia and New Zealand in Wellington, New Zealand.
