= John Graham (rugby union) =

New Zealand educator (1935–2017)

Sir John Graham KNZM CBE ED
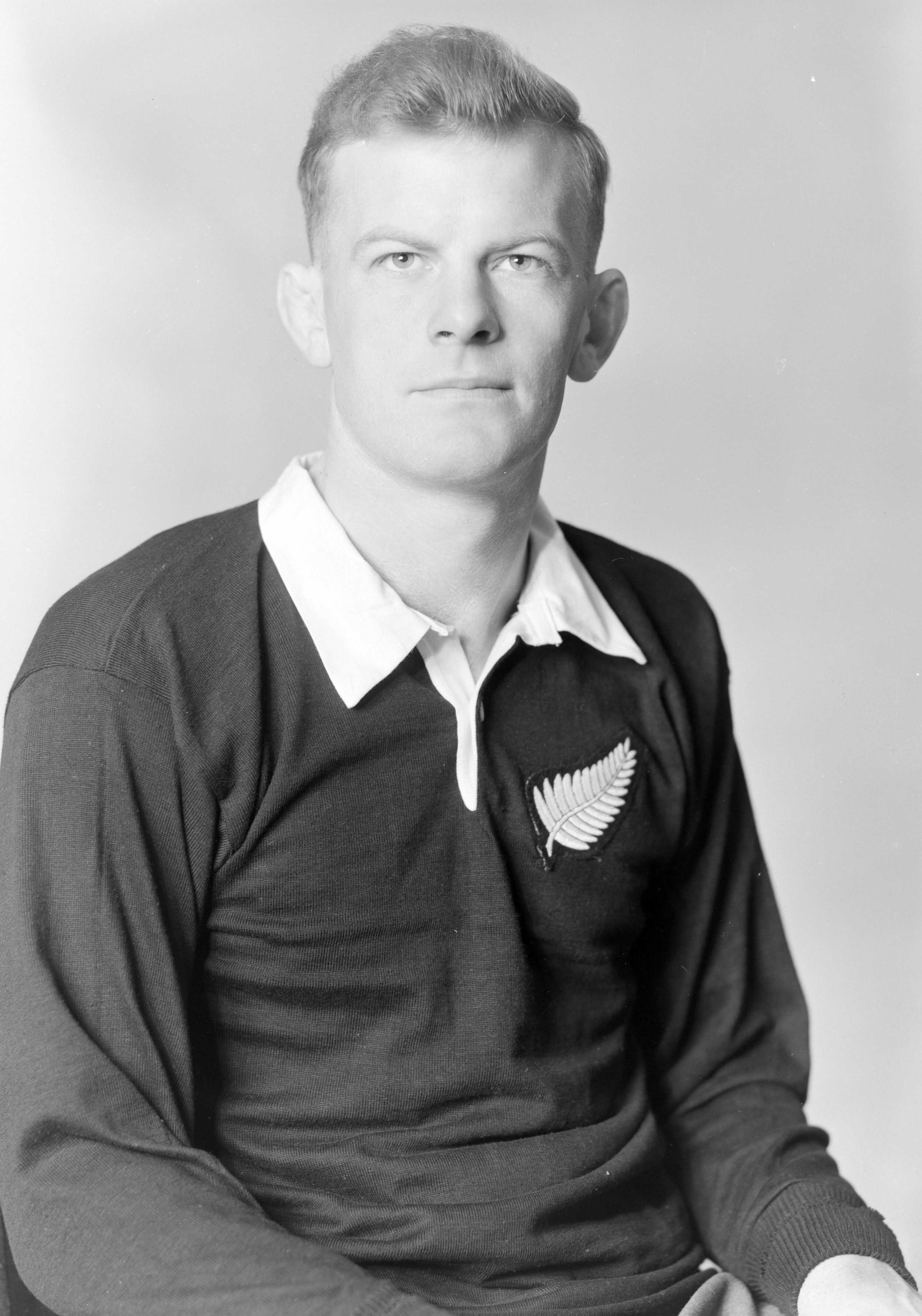
- Graham in 1960
- Born: David John Graham; 9 January 1935 Stratford, New Zealand
- Died: 2 August 2017 (aged 82) Auckland, New Zealand
- Height: 1.78 m (5 ft 10 in)
- Weight: 83 kg (183 lb)
- School: New Plymouth Boys' High School
- University: Auckland University College
- Occupation(s): Educator and educational administrator

Rugby union career
- Position: Flanker, number 8
Provincial / State sides
Years	Team	Apps	(Points)
1955–57	Auckland		
1958–65	Canterbury		
International career
Years	Team	Apps	(Points)
1958–64	New Zealand	22	(6)

Sir David John Graham KNZM CBE ED (9 January 1935 – 2 August 2017), generally known as John Graham, was a New Zealand educator and rugby union player. He served as president of the New Zealand Rugby Football Union (NZRFU) and was an All Black loose forward; he played 22 Tests between 1958 and 1964, including three as captain. He was headmaster of Auckland Grammar School from 1973 to 1993, New Zealand cricket team manager from 1997 to 1999, the University of Auckland Chancellor from 1999 to 2004, and was elected president of the NZRFU in April 2005.

== Early life ==
Born in Stratford, Graham boarded at New Plymouth Boys' High School with his brothers where he received his secondary education, playing in the first XV for two years mainly at first five-eighths. He attended Auckland University College for three years, graduating with a MA (Hons) in history and playing for the Auckland provincial team during that time. He represented Auckland against the 1956 Springboks at Eden Park in just his fourth match for Auckland.

== Rugby career ==
Upon completing his tertiary education in 1958 Graham moved to Christchurch and took up a permanent teaching position at Christchurch Boys' High School. He joined the Christchurch High School Old Boys club rugby team and was immediately made captain, remaining so for the rest of his time there. The same year he was selected for the All Blacks for the first two tests against Australia, making his debut on 23 August in Wellington and helping his team to a 25–3 victory. In 1959 Graham withdrew from the All Black trials, but in 1960 was selected to tour South Africa. He played 10 of the 26 matches, including the second and third tests, and captained the team on a number of occasions.

Graham was an intelligent player with a great turn of speed, and became one of the most intelligent and fastest loose forwards in the All Black side. When Wilson Whineray retired after the tour of Great Britain in 1964, Graham took over the All Black captaincy, a position he held until retiring from rugby in 1965. He had played a total of 31 games for the All Blacks (seven as captain), and a total of 22 tests (three as captain). He scored 11 tries for the All Blacks, two of which were test match tries.

== Post-rugby career ==
After retiring from rugby Graham returned to teaching, being promoted to Head of Social Studies at Christchurch Boys' High School which he held until 1970. He went from there to Linwood High School before being appointed Headmaster of Auckland Grammar in 1973, a position he held for 21 years. Following his tenure at Auckland Grammar, Graham was appointed a commissioner of the newly founded low-decile Southern Cross Campus in 1997, with varying success.

Graham was outspoken about rugby, its organisation and its place in New Zealand culture. After touring South Africa with the All Blacks in 1960, he said that "if we had any conscience and feeling for humanity, we should not have been touring South Africa". Along with Wilson Whineray he declined to attend the matches of the 1981 Springbok tour of New Zealand. Graham has also criticised the presence of advertising on the All Black jersey; "I may be a dinosaur in this respect, but I don't think anything should go on the All Black jersey other than the silver fern".

Graham believed New Zealanders focus excessively on the sport of rugby, stating, "I don't think rugby union is anywhere near as important in this country as solving the problems of poverty and unemployment. We're happy, aren't we, when our rugby team goes well, yet we're prepared to let some aspects of our nation go almost ignored."

Graham spent decades working in education, and served as chairman of the New Zealand Education Scholarship Trust. He was critical of much of what is produced by contemporary educationalists, believing that "To assume, as so many teachers do today, that the knowledge has to come from the children and all they have to do is pull it out, is educational nonsense."

Graham died of cancer in Auckland on 2 August 2017. His wife, Shiela, Lady Graham, died in 2026.

== Honours and awards ==
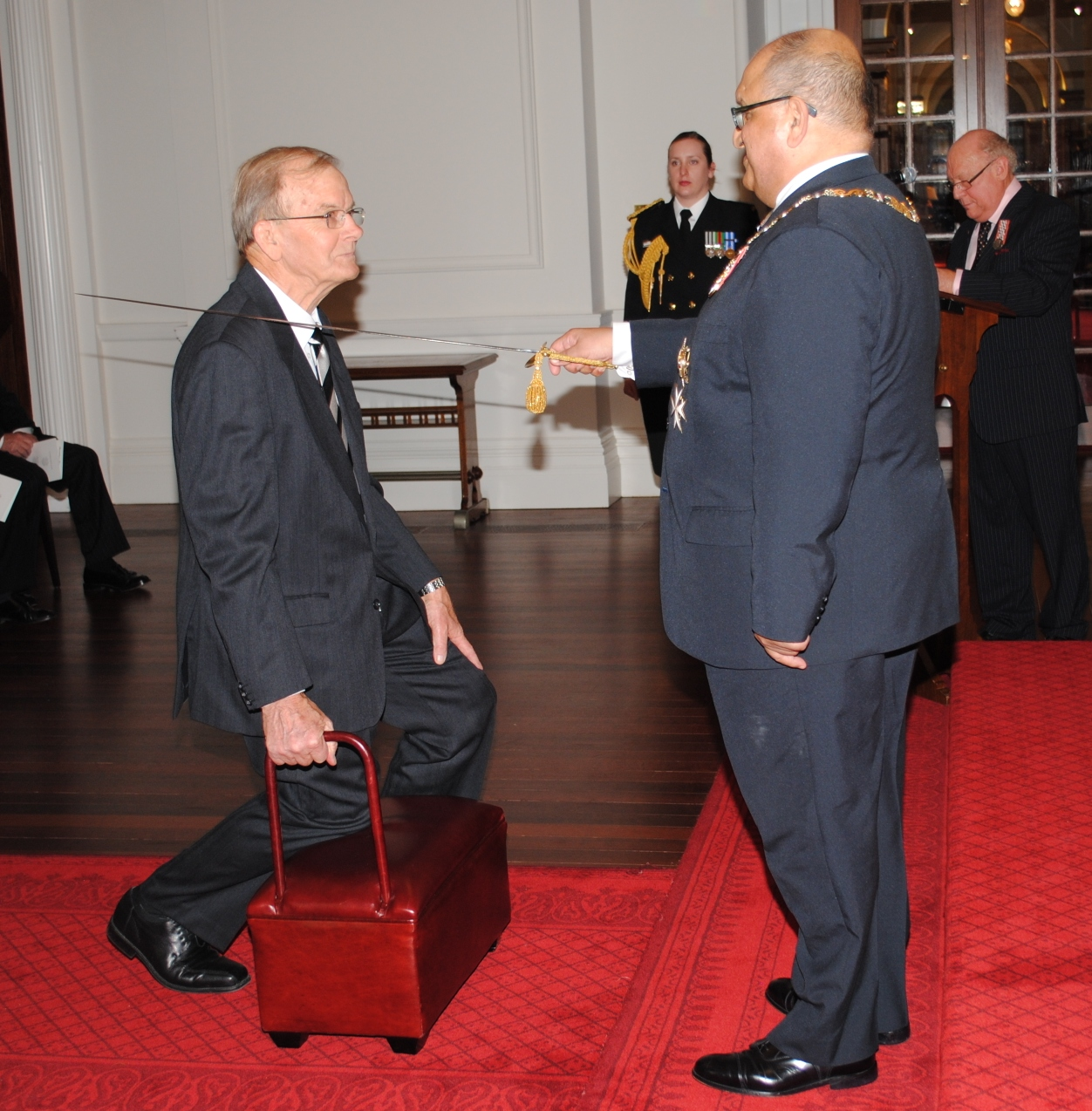
Graham's investiture as a Knight Companion of the New Zealand Order of Merit by the governor-general, Sir Anand Satyanand, at Government House, Wellington on 4 August 2011

In the 1994 Queen's Birthday Honours, Graham was appointed a Commander of the Order of the British Empire, for services to education. He managed the New Zealand cricket team from 1997 to 1999, and was appointed Chancellor of the University of Auckland in 1999 until retiring from the position in 2004. In the business world, Mr Graham held a number of directorships including The University Bookshop Ltd where he was Chair, IT distributor Renaissance Corporation, and transportation company Owens Group Ltd. Graham was also a director of the Auckland-based private education provider, Academic Colleges Group.

In 1999, Graham was named "New Zealander of the Year" by North & South magazine, the cover article of the January 2000 edition running under the heading, "John Graham, the man who set standards". The break-out quote described him as:

"All Black captain, for 21 years headmaster of Auckland Grammar School, rugby coach, company director, businessman, commissioner of the troubled Nga Tapawae College, manager of the New Zealand cricket team. Renaissance man and Chancellor of the University of Auckland."

Graham was elected president of the New Zealand Rugby Football Union in 2005, and received an Honorary Doctorate from the University of Auckland the same year.

In the 2011 Queen's Birthday Honours, Graham was appointed a Knight Companion of the New Zealand Order of Merit, for services to education and sports.

Sporting positions
Preceded by Wilson Whineray	All Blacks Captain; 1964–1965	Succeeded by Brian Lochore
Awards
Preceded by Tana Umaga	Leadership Award; 2007	Succeeded by Susie Simcock
