= 1971 World Netball Tournament =

International netball tournament hosted by Jamaica

Tournament details
- Host country: Jamaica
- City: Kingston
- Venue: National Stadium
- Dates: 31 December 1970– 12 January 1971
- Teams: 9

Final positions
- Champions: Australia (2nd title)
- Runners-up: New Zealand
- Third place: England

Tournament statistics
- Matches played: 36

The 1971 World Netball Tournament was the third Netball World Cup. It was organised by the International Federation of Women's Basketball and Netball Associations. It featured nine teams playing a series of netball test matches at the National Stadium in Kingston, Jamaica. With a team coached by Wilma Ritchie and captained by Gaye Walsh, Australia won the tournament after winning all eight of their matches. Once again, it was a battle between Australia and New Zealand to become champions. A 48–42 victory on the final day saw Australia regain the trophy. England finished in third place.

== Teams, head coaches and captains ==
Team	Head coach	Captain
Australia	Wilma Ritchie	Gaye Walsh
Bahamas		Winnifred Russell
England	Mary French	Anna Miles
Jamaica	Jo Wigman	Vilma McDonald
New Zealand	Taini Jamison	Joan Harnett
Northern Ireland	Doreen Dutton	Jill Finlay ??
Scotland	Lena Fraser	Marie Fairie
Trinidad and Tobago	Lystra Lewis	Enid Browne
Wales	Wendy White	Anne Lucas

== Milestones ==
- Trinidad and Tobago were appearing in their third consecutive Netball World Cup and four of their players were making their third appearance at the tournament. Janet Bailey, Enid Browne, Theresa McLawrence and Jean Pierre all previously played in 1963 and 1967. New Zealand's Joan Harnett, and Jamaica's Avis Collins were also making their third Netball World Cup appearance.

== Match officials ==
Umpires included

Umpire	Association
Fay Bevan	Australia
Lystra Lewis	Trinidad and Tobago
Maureen Milner	Wales
Leila Robinson	Jamaica
Margaret Thompson	England

== Matches ==
=== Round 1 ===
Wednesday, 30 December 1970	Jamaica	44–18	Scotland

Thursday, 31 December 1970	New Zealand	90–12	Northern Ireland
	Frances Wiringi 62/80 (78%); Joan Harnett 28/34 (82%)

Thursday, 31 December 1970	England	88–7	Bahamas

Thursday, 31 December 1970	Trinidad and Tobago	45–19	Wales

=== Round 2 ===
Friday, 1 January 1971	Australia	47–21	Jamaica

Friday, 1 January 1971	New Zealand	61–17	Scotland
	Sandra Norman 45/65 (69%); Joan Harnett 16/23 (70%)

Friday, 1 January 1971	Wales	57–11	Bahamas

Friday, 1 January 1971	England	61–27	Trinidad and Tobago

=== Round 3 ===
Saturday, 2 January 1971	Australia	70–9	Northern Ireland

Saturday, 2 January 1971	New Zealand	108–10	Bahamas
	Frances Wiringi 75/90 (83%); Joan Harnett 33/37 (89%)

Saturday, 2 January 1971	England	44–30	Jamaica

Saturday, 2 January 1971	Scotland	41–37	Wales

=== Round 4 ===
Monday, 4 January 1971	Australia	96–4	Bahamas
	Margaret Gollan 55/71 (77%); Ricky Pyatt 41/62 (66%)

Monday, 4 January 1971	Trinidad and Tobago	45–18	Scotland

Monday, 4 January 1971	Jamaica	70–17	Northern Ireland

=== Round 5 ===
Tuesday, 5 January 1971	New Zealand	83–21	Wales
	Frances Wiringi 67/83 (81%); Joan Harnett 16/23 (70%)		Lesley Owen 15/30 (50%); Lynne Windsor 6/20 (30%)

Tuesday, 5 January 1971	Australia	43–27	Trinidad and Tobago

Tuesday, 5 January 1971	England	94–13	Northern Ireland
	Judy Heath 78/95 (82%) ?? 16

=== Round 6 ===
Wednesday, 6 January 1971	Scotland	40–15	Bahamas

Wednesday, 6 January 1971	Trinidad and Tobago	34–34	Jamaica

Wednesday, 6 January 1971	New Zealand	42–40	England
	Frances Wiringi 29/47 (62%); Joan Harnett 13/35 (37%)		Judy Heath 33/42 (79%); Pat Watson 7/13 (54%)

=== Round 7 ===
Thursday, 7 January 1971	Australia	71–16	Scotland

Thursday, 7 January 1971	Jamaica	55–33	Wales

Thursday, 7 January 1971	Northern Ireland	49–28	Bahamas

=== Round 8 ===
Friday, 8 January 1971	New Zealand	47–33	Trinidad and Tobago

Friday, 8 January 1971	England	76–10	Scotland

Friday, 8 January 1971	Australia	87–8	Wales

=== Round 9 ===
Saturday, 9 January 1971	Wales	34–30	Northern Ireland

Saturday, 9 January 1971	New Zealand	52–32	Jamaica
	Sandra Norman 30/53 (57%); Joan Harnett 22/39 (56%)

Saturday, 9 January 1971	Trinidad and Tobago	73–24	Bahamas

Saturday, 9 January 1971	Australia	38–37	England
	Margaret Gollan 24/46 (52%); Elsma Merillo 14/25 (56%)		Judy Heath 33/34 (97%) ?? 4

=== Round 10 ===
Monday, 11 January 1971	England	72–12	Wales

Monday, 11 January 1971	Jamaica	61–15	Bahamas

Monday, 11 January 1971	Scotland	46–27	Northern Ireland

=== Round 11 ===
Tuesday, 12 January 1971	Trinidad and Tobago	66–14	Northern Ireland

Tuesday, 12 January 1971	Australia	48–42	New Zealand
	Margaret Gollan 31/50 (62%); Elsma Merillo 17/28 (61%)		Frances Wiringi; Joan Harnett	Umpires: Leila Robinson (Jamaica)

== Final table ==
Pos	Team	P	W	D	L	GF	GA	GD	Pts
1st place, gold medalist(s)	Australia	8	8	0	0	500	164	+336	16
2nd place, silver medalist(s)	New Zealand	8	7	0	1	525	222	+303	14
3rd place, bronze medalist(s)	England	8	6	0	2	512	179	+333	12
4	Jamaica	8	4	1	3	367	260	+107	9
5	Trinidad and Tobago	8	4	1	3	350	260	+90	9
6	Scotland	8	3	0	5	206	376	-164	6
7	Wales	8	2	0	6	221	424	-203	4
8	Northern Ireland	8	1	0	7	171	442	-271	2
9	Bahamas	8	0	0	8	114	572	-458	0

== Medallists ==
Gold	Silver	Bronze
Australia; Coach: Wilma Shakespear	New Zealand; Coach: Taini Jamison	England; Coach: Mary French
Terese Delaney; Margaret Gollan; Stella Gollan; Elsma Merillo; Ricky Pyatt; Noela Routley; Cheryl Sidebottom; Annette Simper; Anne Walker; Gaye Walsh (c)	Joan Harnett (c); Nancy King; Shirley Langrope; Lorraine Mair; Olwyn McKay; Sandra Norman; Coral Palmer; Tilly Vercoe; Brenda Walker; Frances Wiringi	Judi Day; Sally Dewhurst; Pat Dudgeon; Judy Heath; Cathy Hickey; Elizabeth Kelly; Anne Miles (c); Carol Percy; Rita Rees; Linda Scovell; Eunice Smith; Pat Watson
