= ACG Strathallan =

Location
- Hayfield Way, Karaka, New Zealand

Information
- Type: Private (infant centre, preschool, primary school and secondary school)
- Motto: "Pride in Achievement"
- Established: 2001
- Ministry of Education Institution no.: 441
- Principal: Danny O'Connor
- Enrolment: 1,263
- Socio-economic decile: 10Z
- Website: www.strathallan.acgedu.com

ACG Strathallan is an independent co-educational school located on the Hingaia Peninsula in Karaka, New Zealand, close to the Auckland Southern Motorway. It is part of ACG Education (formerly known as Academic Colleges Group) whose New Zealand schools are members of Independent Schools of New Zealand (ISNZ).

The campus opened in February 2001. Its facility provides education through the ACG Strathallan Preschool Centre (for children aged three months to five years), ACG Strathallan School for Years 1 to 6, and ACG Strathallan College for Years 7 to 13 offering the University of Cambridge International Examinations (CIE). The school is a member of the Association of Cambridge Schools in New Zealand and is also a registered Cambridge International Fellowship Centre.

The school is currently owned and operated by Inspired Education Group, an international provider of for-profit schools.

== School leadership ==
Danny O'Connor is Strathallan’s current executive principal. He was appointed in Term 3 of 2017 to replace Robin Kirkham who had been the school Principal since 2010. Robin was appointed in Term 2 of 2010 to replace Clarence van der Wel, Strathallan’s foundation executive principal, who left to take up a full-time position with Academic Colleges Group as deputy chief executive. He is now the Director of Schools. The executive principal oversees the preschool centre, primary school and college. The college is also run by two deputy principals and an assistant principal. The primary school is run by a principal and two deans, and the preschool centre is run by the preschool manager.

The college employs six deans, and as well as administrative and support staff, the school employs 50–60 teachers.

== Houses ==
The school has four house clusters; Batten House (formerly Blue House, renamed after Jean Batten), McLaren House (formerly Red House, renamed after Bruce McLaren), Angus House (formerly Yellow House, renamed after Rita Angus) and Wilkins House (formerly Green House, renamed after Maurice Wilkins.
