= Brenda Rowberry =

New Zealand netball player

Brenda Rowberry is a former netball player in New Zealand. She played for her country on 12 occasions, including in the 1971 Netball World Championships. She is the mother of Anna Stanley, who played netball for the Silver Ferns 92 times.

== Early life ==
Brenda Rowberry (née Walker) was born on 3 December 1946. She went to the University of Otago School of Physical Education (OUSPE) in Dunedin, where she met her husband, Jerry Rowberry, who would go on to teach Physical Education at Christ's College, Canterbury. They both graduated in 1969. While at university, Rowberry competed in athletics in shot put, discus and javelin events. She took part in the New Zealand University Games in athletics and represented the New Zealand universities in competition with Australian universities.

== Netball career ==
Rowberry played netball for Canterbury. She was first selected for the Silver Ferns, the national team, in June 1969, becoming the 48th woman to play for the team, and was on the team until 1971. She played mainly in the Goal Defence position, usually in partnership with Tilly Hirst. Rowberry was a strong player, helped by her athletic training, and was one of the few netball players of the time who did weight training. She took part in the 1971 World Netball Championships, which were held in Kingston, Jamaica, with New Zealand finishing second.

== Later career ==
Rowberry taught Physical Education for 16 years at Linwood High School (now Linwood College) in Christchurch and then transferred to Rangi Ruru Girls' School in Christchurch. She also coached netball, often at the Sacred Hearts College Old Girls' Club. A junior-grade netball competition between schools in the Canterbury region is known as the Brenda Rowberry Cup. In 2018 she and her husband were both given a Service Award by the New Zealand Secondary Schools Athletic Association.

== Family ==
Rowberry and her husband have four daughters. Their second daughter, Anna, played for the Silver Ferns on 92 occasions. They were the second mother and daughter to play for the Silver Ferns, one year after Belinda Charteris, daughter of Judy Blair, first played for the team.
