= ACG Parnell College =

ACG Parnell

Location
- 2 Titoki Street / 39 George Street / 9 Davis Crescent / 3 Broadway; Parnell; Auckland 1023; New Zealand; 36.8632°S 174.7788°E

Information
- Type: Private co-educational composite (Years 1–13) school
- Established: 1998
- Ministry of Education Institution no.: 2085
- Principal: Damian Watson
- Enrolment: 1,963 (July 2026)
- Socio-economic decile: 10Z
- Website: www.parnellcollege.acgedu.com

ACG Parnell is an independent co-educational facility and is part of ACG Schools, with its New Zealand branches being members of the Independent Schools of New Zealand (ISNZ). It is situated in the suburb of Parnell in Auckland, New Zealand. The college offers the Cambridge Assessment International Education (CAIE). Additionally, it is affiliated with the Association of Cambridge Schools in New Zealand. ACG Parnell College consists four campuses: the Early Learning School on 110 Park Road, Primary School Campuses on 39 George Street, Middle School Campus on 2 Titoki Street (which serves as the Main ACG Parnell College building), and a Senior Campus at 9 Davis Crescent.

The school is currently owned and operated by Inspired Education Group, an international provider of for-profit schools.

== History ==
ACG Parnell (formerly ACG Junior College, then ACG Parnell College) was founded in 1998 and originally provided education for students in Years 7 to 10. In 2007 the college was redeveloped, renamed and expanded to offer places at Years 1 to 13.

In 2019 ACG Parnell College opened its new expansion of the college, named ACG Senior Campus. The campus is located on 9 Davis Crescent, Newmarket. The campus offers Cambridge International Examinations. The new Senior Campus serves Year 11, 12 and 13 only. In July 2020, an Early Learning School was opened.

== School leadership ==
Mr Larne Edmeades was the school's former Principal, appointed in 2005. Edmeades worked with staff to establish and develop the new ACG campus and left the college at the end of 2016, leaving Mr Ed Coup as the Acting Principal. In early June 2017, Mr Russell Brooke became the Principal and left the school on 1 March 2020, leaving Mr Damian Watson as the current Principal.

The Principal is in charge of the primary school and college. At ACG Parnell College, the Senior Leadership Team consists of the Principal, two Deputy Principals, an Associate Principal and an Assistant Principal (Pastoral).

The school employs approximately 100 teachers and more than 20 administrative staff.

== Curriculum ==
ACG Parnell College offers Cambridge Assessment International Education (CAIE) for Year 11-13. From 2019, due to the merge with ACG Senior College, ACG Parnell College also offered the International Baccalaureate Diploma Programme (IBDP). The International Baccalaureate Diploma Programme (IBDP) was no longer available from 2022 and the school's last IB cohort (Year 13) graduated in December 2023.

Advanced Maths is available for Years 8, 9, and 10. Advanced Science is available for Year 10. Students taking Advanced Maths and Science in Year 10 will sit the Cambridge IGCSE Exams in November (IGCSE Exams are normally taken in Year 11).

All Year 5 students learn Spanish and all Year 6 students learn French, or to have extra English support. From Year 7, students can choose to take either Spanish or Chinese (Mandarin), and in Year 9, students may pick from an additional choice of French. Language is compulsory up to and including Year 10.

== Demographics ==
Last visited by Education Review Office (ERO) on 29 November 2019.

The current school roll is 1878 with students in Years 1 to 13, with a maximum of 28 students in each class. There are approximately 45% girls and 55% boys at the school. The ethnic composition was 13% New Zealand European, 70% Asian and 17% other ethnic groups (the prioritised ethnicity method has been used to handle people with multiple ethnicities).

== Notable alumni ==
- Jennie, member of K-pop girl group Blackpink
