= ACG Schools =

New Zealand-based education company

- Formerly: ACG Education
- Type: Private
- Traded as: ACG
- Industry: Education
- Founded: 14 November 1994; 32 years ago in Auckland, New Zealand
- Founders: Sir John Graham; Dawn Jones
- Headquarters: Level 2/18 Normanby Road, Mount Eden, Auckland, New Zealand
- Area served: Australia, New Zealand, Indonesia, and Vietnam
- Key people: Glenn Andrew (CEO)
- Brands: ACG
- Owner: Inspired Education Group
- Website: ACG Website

ACG Schools (formerly known as ACG Education) is a New Zealand–based private education company that operates schools and preschools in New Zealand and Asia. Incorporated as a New Zealand Limited Liability Company in 1994 it established its first school in 1994; and now ACG Schools delivers education to over 4,700 students in three countries through its 10 campuses located in 4 cities. It is New Zealand's largest independent private schools group. It was acquired by Inspired Education Group in 2019 for an undisclosed sum.

== History ==
Sir John Graham and Dawn Jones established Senior College of New Zealand, New Zealand's first school for senior students, in 1995. This was the founding school of the ACG group, which now comprises independent schools and vocational colleges around New Zealand.

In February 2013, Waterman Capital took a 24% shareholding in ACG, and executive director of Waterman Capital Matt Riley joined the Board. Waterman was among the shareholders who agreed to sell ACG to Pacific Equity Partners.

In May 2015, the National Business released a statement that ACG had appointed UBS and Macquarie to run the sale process. On 17 September 2015, Pacific Equity Partners announced they had agreed to acquire ACG for an undisclosed sum.

In April 2017, ACG Education announced their purchase of English language school, The Campbell Institute. On 1 July 2017 ACG Education purchased Intueri Education Group's seven New Zealand vocational colleges.

== Schools ==
=== New Zealand Independent Schools ===
ACG has four independent schools in New Zealand. Three are in Auckland—ACG Parnell College, ACG Strathallan, and ACG Sunderland and one, ACG Tauranga, is in Tauranga. The schools are secular and co-ed and teach Cambridge International Examinations.

ACG also has one preschool centre in Queenstown, Zig Zag Zoo.

In 2018 ACG Senior College was closed and set to merge with ACG Parnell College. In 2019 ACG Parnell College opened its Senior Campus for year 12 and 13 students enrolled in the college.

=== International Schools ===
- Australia International School Vietnam
- ACG School Jakarta

== Awards ==
Award	Awarded by	Year	Notes
LTM Star High School	The Language Travel Magazine Awards	2011	
Exporter of the Year Award – Consultants and Services Category	Air NZ Cargo Awards	2011	
ST Star High School	Study Travel Star Awards	2011	

== See also ==
- For-profit education
- Wentworth College
- Kristin School
