= List of Netball World Cup medallists =

Netball World Cup medallists

The following is a list of medal winners at the Netball World Cup.

== 1963 ==
Gold	Silver	Bronze
Australia; Coach: Lorna McConchie	New Zealand; Coach: Dixie Cockerton	England; Coach: Ellen Marsh
Joyce Brown (c); Margaret Caldow; Valerie Eaton; Corrin Fleming; Annette Foley; Jeanette McIver; June Noseda; Wilma Ritchie; Ingrid Tough; Madeleine Wilson (vc)	Lesley Baker; Judy Blair; Pamela Edmonds (c); Rebecca Faulkner; Joan Martin; Colleen McMaster; Betty McNamara; Lois Muir (vc); Elva Simpson; Mirth Te Moananui	Kathleen Bays; Betty Burke; Annette Cairncross; Margaret Eve; Blanche Fidler; Jean Heath; Josephine Higgins (c); Valerie Hindmarsh; Judith Iddon; Patricia Spratt; Anne Stephenson (vc); Pat Wells

== 1967 ==
Gold	Silver	Bronze
New Zealand; Coach: Taini Jamison	Australia; Coach: Margaret Pewtress	South Africa; Coach:
Judy Blair (c); Ann Boelee; Margaret Gardiner; Pam Hamilton; Joan Harnett; Billie Irwin; Sandra James; Elizabeth Rowley; Mirth Solomon; Tilly Vercoe	Chris Burton; Lynette Davey (c); Stella Gollan; Elsma Harris; Maureen Kirsanovs; Heather McLean; Ellen O'Shannassy; Glenyse Suiter; Gaye Switch; Carole Ann White	Alet Charnley; Heloise Ferreira; Margaret Grant; Elbie Joubert; Marina Klusmann; Maudie Laubscher; Tobianna Louw; Doreen Otto (c); Ellie Roberts; Marlene Wagner

== 1971 ==
Gold	Silver	Bronze
Australia; Coach: Wilma Shakespear	New Zealand; Coach: Taini Jamison	England; Coach: Mary French
Terese Delaney; Margaret Gollan; Stella Gollan; Elsma Merillo; Ricky Pyatt; Noela Routley; Cheryl Sidebottom; Annette Simper; Anne Walker; Gaye Walsh (c)	Joan Harnett (c); Nancy King; Shirley Langrope; Lorraine Mair; Olwyn McKay; Sandra Norman; Coral Palmer; Tilly Vercoe; Brenda Walker; Frances Webster	Judi Day; Sally Dewhurst; Pat Dudgeon; Judy Heath; Cathy Hickey; Elizabeth Kelly; Anne Miles (c); Carol Percy; Rita Rees; Linda Scovell; Eunice Smith

== 1975 ==
Gold	Silver	Bronze
Australia; Coach: Joyce Brown	England; Coach: Mary French	New Zealand; Coach: Lois Muir
Chris Burton; Margaret Caldow (c); Gail Dorrington; Margaret Gollan; Sharon Hayes; Maryanne Kruyer; Norma Plummer; Pam Redmond; Cheryl Stevenson; Betty Taylor	Linda Allison; Pat Cane; Lesley Darby; Madeleine Dwan; Cathy Hickey; Lynne Macdonald; Christine Maylor; Anne Miles (c); Colette Reeder; Marie Stewart; Patricia Watson	Maxine Blomquist; Beth Carnie; Frances Granger; Lyn Parker; Shirley Langrope (c); Millie Munro; Christine Pietzner; Georgie Salter; Anne Taylor; Yvonne Willering

== 1979 ==
Gold	Silver	Bronze
Australia; Coach: Wilma Shakespear	New Zealand; Coach: Lois Muir	Trinidad and Tobago; Coach: Lystra Lewis
Sharon Burton; Margaret Caldow (c); Betty Carroll; Gail Dorrington; Julie Francou; Terese Kennedy; Pam Redmond; Anne Sargeant; Gaye Teede; Yvonne Waters	Maxine Blomquist; Ruth Fathers; Margaret Forsyth; Lyn Parker (c); Janice Henderson; Margharet Kamana; Geane Katae; Leigh Mills; Millie Munro; Christine Pietzner; Lynn Proudlove; Yvonne Willering	Sherril Peters (c); Althea Luces; Jennifer Williams; Jean Pierre; Peggy Castanada; Cyrenia Charles; Ingrid Blackman; Angela Burke Browne; Veryl A Kretschmar; Heather Charleau; Marcia Simsoy Frank; Jennifer Nurse

Notes

- ^1 Australia, New Zealand and Trinidad and Tobago were actually declared the joint winners. The tournament had no tie-break criteria. For the purposes of this table, goal average was used to decide the order of teams.

== 1983 ==
Gold	Silver	Bronze
Australia; Coach: Joyce Brown	New Zealand; Coach: Lois Muir	Trinidad and Tobago
Diane Cleveland; Julie Francou (c); Chris Harris; Sue Hawkins; Dianne McDonald; Jill McIntosh; Kav Partington; Anne Sargeant; Jane Searle; Karan Smith	Rita Fatialofa; Tracey Fear; Margaret Forsyth; Leigh Gibbs; Margharet Matenga; Rhonda Meads; Lyn Parker (c); Lynn Proudlove; Waimarama Taumaunu; Yvonne Willering	Naomi Babb; Jeanne Bailey; Sharon Blake; Peggy Castanada; Heather Charleau; Jennifer Frank; Marcia Frank; Maria Lewis; Bridget Mitchell; Grace Parkinson; Sherril Peters; Hazel Taylor

== 1987 ==
Gold	Silver	Bronze
New Zealand; Coach: Lois Muir	Trinidad and Tobago	Australia; Coach: Wilma Shakespear
Tracy Eyrl; Rita Fatialofa; Tracey Fear; Margaret Forsyth; Leigh Gibbs (c); Annette Heffernan; Sandra Mallet; Margharet Matenga; Angela Pule; Joan Solia; Waimarama Taumaunu; Julie Townsend	Bridget Adams; Jeanne Bailey; Sherry Ann Blackman; Sharon Castanada; Heather Charleau; Jennifer Frank; Hyacinth Hart; Cheryl Herbert; Annette Hutchinson; Muriel Mitchell; Erica Outram; Hazel Taylor	Diane Atkinson; Lisa Beehag; Keeley Devery; Marcia Ella; Chris Harris; Sally Ironmonger; Roselee Jencke; Michelle Jones; Sue Kenny; Janelle Peterson; Anne Sargeant (c); Vicki Wilson

Notes

- ^1 Australia and Trinidad and Tobago were actually declared the joint runners up. The tournament had no tie-break criteria. For the purposes of this table, goal scored was used to decide the order of teams.

== 1991 ==
Gold	Silver	Bronze
Australia; Coach: Joyce Brown	New Zealand; Coach: Lyn Parker	Jamaica; Coach: Maureen Hall
Carissa Dalwood; Keeley Devery; Michelle Fielke (c); Sharon Finnan; Roselee Jencke; Jennifer Kennett; Sue Kenny; Simone McKinnis; Shelley O'Donnell; Catriona Wagg; Vicki Wilson	Julie Carter; Tanya Cox; Robin Dillimore; Sandra Edge; Tracy Eyrl-Shortland; Joan Hodson; Leonie Leaver; Ana Noovao; Waimarama Taumaunu (c); Carron Topping; Sheryl Waite; Louisa Wall	Charmaine Aldridge; Valerie Blake; Karen Clarke; Connie Francis; Janet Francis; Karlene Hamilton; Janet Johnson (c); Marva Lindsay; Patricia McDonald; Marjorie Patterson; Oberon Pitterson; Sharon Taylor

== 1995 ==
Gold	Silver	Bronze
Australia; Coach: Jill McIntosh	South Africa; Coach: Marlene Wagner	New Zealand; Coach: Leigh Gibbs
Jenny Borlase; Shelley O'Donnell; Carissa Dalwood; Kath Harby; Natalie Avellino; Liz Ellis; Vicki Wilson; Sarah Sutter; Nicole Cusack; Marianne Murphy; Michelle Fielke (c); Simone McKinnis	Debbie Hamman (c); Irene van Dyk; Benita van Zyl; Elize Kotze; Rese Hugo; Dominique Harverson; Annie Kloppers; Tessa Halgryn; Estelle Rossouw; Laurie Keevy; Rene Odendaal; Johrina Basson	Belinda Blair; Julie Dawson; Sandra Edge (c); Sharon Gold; Carron Jerram; Debbie Matoe; Bernice Mene; Lesley Nicol; Anna Rowberry; Tracy Eyrl-Shortland; Elisa Taringa; Noeline Taurua-Barnett

== 1999 ==
Gold	Silver	Bronze
Australia; Coach: Jill McIntosh	New Zealand; Coach: Yvonne Willering	England; Coach: Mary Beardwood
Vicki Wilson (c); Jenny Borlase; Carissa Dalwood; Jacqui Delaney; Liz Ellis; Sharon Finnan; Kathryn Harby; Janine Ilitch; Sharelle McMahon; Shelley O'Donnell; Rebecca Sanders; Peta Squire	Belinda Colling (c); Donna Loffhagen; Adine Harper; Teresa Tairi; Anna Rowberry; Sonya Hardcastle; Julie Seymour; Lesley Nicol; Belinda Charteris; Lorna Suafoa; Linda Vagana; Bernice Mene	Joanne Zinzan (c); Amanda Newton; Olivia Murphy; Tracey Neville (vc); Alex Astle; Karen Aspinall; Naomi Siddall; Sonia Mkoloma; Hellen Manufor; Helen Lonsdale; Lyn Carpenter; Lisa Stanley

== 2003 ==
Gold	Silver	Bronze
New Zealand; Coach: Ruth Aitken	Australia; Coach: Jill McIntosh	Jamaica; Coach: Maureen Hall
Sheryl Clarke; Belinda Colling; Tania Dalton; Vilimaina Davu; Leana du Plooy; Temepara George; Lesley Nicol; Anna Rowberry (c); Anna Scarlett; Jodi Te Huna; Irene van Dyk; Adine Wilson	Alison Broadbent; Natasha Chokljat; Catherine Cox; Liz Ellis (vc); Kathryn Harby-Williams (c); Janine Ilitch; Sharelle McMahon; Cynna Neele; Nicole Richardson; Rebecca Sanders; Peta Scholz; Eloise Southby	Nadine Bryan; Althea Byfield; Elaine Davis (vc); Kasey Evering; Simone Forbes; Connie Francis; Nichala Gibson; Georgia Gordon; Oberon Pitterson (c); Sharon Wiles; Carla Williams; Tiffany Wolfe

== 2007 ==
Gold	Silver	Bronze
Australia; Coach: Norma Plummer	New Zealand; Coach: Ruth Aitken	Jamaica; Coach: Connie Francis
Liz Ellis (c); Sharelle McMahon (vc); Bianca Chatfield; Catherine Cox; Mo'onia Gerrard; Selina Gilsenan; Natalie Medhurst; Lauren Nourse; Susan Pratley; Julie Prendergast; Laura von Bertouch; Natalie von Bertouch	Adine Wilson (c); Julie Seymour (vc); Maree Bowden; Leana de Bruin; Paula Griffin; Joline Henry; Laura Langman; Sheryl Scanlan; Jodi Te Huna; Maria Tutaia; Irene van Dyk; Casey Williams	Elaine Davis (c); Nicole Aiken; Romelda Aiken; Nadine Bryan; Althea Byfield; Kasey Evering; Simone Forbes; Nichala Gibson; Sasher-Gaye Henry; Christina Solmon; Paula Thompson; Sharon Wiles

== 2011 ==
Gold	Silver	Bronze
Australia; Coach: Norma Plummer	New Zealand; Coach: Ruth Aitken	England; Coach: Sue Hawkins
Caitlin Bassett; Erin Bell; Julie Corletto; Catherine Cox (vc); Susan Fuhrmann; Laura Geitz; Mo'onia Gerrard; Kimberlee Green; Sharni Layton; Natalie Medhurst; Chelsea Pitman; Natalie von Bertouch (c)	Leana de Bruin; Temepara George (vc); Katrina Grant; Paula Griffin; Joline Henry; Laura Langman; Liana Leota; Anna Scarlett; Anna Thompson; Maria Tutaia; Irene van Dyk; Casey Williams (c)	Karen Atkinson (cc); Eboni Beckford-Chambers; Louisa Brownfield; Jade Clarke; Pamela Cookey; Rachel Dunn; Stacey Francis; Tamsin Greenway; Serena Guthrie; Joanne Harten; Geva Mentor; Sonia Mkoloma (cc)

== 2015 ==
Gold	Silver	Bronze
Australia; Coach: Lisa Alexander	New Zealand; Coach: Waimarama Taumaunu	England; Coach: Tracey Neville
Caitlin Thwaites; Natalie Medhurst; Erin Bell; Paige Hadley; Julie Corletto; Rebecca Bulley; Sharni Layton; Caitlin Bassett; Kimberlee Green; Kim Ravaillion; Renae Hallinan; Laura Geitz	Malia Paseka; Jodi Brown; Grace Rasmussen; Kayla Cullen; Leana de Bruin; Phoenix Karaka; Bailey Mes; Shannon Francois; Katrina Grant; Maria Tutaia; Laura Langman; Casey Kopua	Joanne Harten; Helen Housby; Tamsin Greenway; Jade Clarke; Serena Guthrie; Sonia Mkoloma; Eboni Beckford-Chambers; Pamela Cookey; Geva Mentor; Sara Bayman; Rachel Dunn; Stacey Francis

== 2019 ==
Gold	Silver	Bronze
New Zealand; Coach: Noeline Taurua	Australia; Coach: Lisa Alexander	England; Coach: Tracey Neville
Maria Folau; Laura Langman (c); Ameliaranne Ekenasio; Gina Crampton; Bailey Mes; Casey Kopua; Jane Watson; Shannon Saunders; Karin Burger; Phoenix Karaka; Katrina Rore; Te Paea Selby-Rickit	Caitlin Bassett (c); April Brandley; Kelsey Browne; Courtney Bruce; Paige Hadley; Sarah Klau; Jamie-Lee Price; Caitlin Thwaites; Gretel Tippett; Elizabeth Watson (vc); Jo Weston; Stephanie Wood	Helen Housby; Joanne Harten; Natalie Haythornthwaite; Rachel Dunn; Serena Guthrie (c); Jade Clarke (vc); Chelsea Pitman; Natalie Panagarry; Layla Guscoth; Eboni Usoro-Brown; Geva Mentor; Francesca Williams

== 2023 ==
Gold	Silver	Bronze
Australia; Coach: Stacey Marinkovich	England; Coach: Jess Thirlby	Jamaica; Coach: Connie Francis
Liz Watson (c); Sunday Aryang; Kiera Austin; Ash Brazill; Courtney Bruce; Sophie Garbin; Paige Hadley; Sarah Klau; Cara Koenen; Jamie-Lee Price; Jo Weston; Stephanie Wood	Natalie Metcalf (co-c); Layla Guscoth (co-c); Imogen Allison; Eleanor Cardwell; Jade Clarke; Funmi Fadoju; Helen Housby; Laura Malcolm; Geva Mentor; Chelsea Pitman; Olivia Tchine; Fran Williams	Romelda Aiken-George; Shanice Beckford; Kadie-Ann Dehaney; Nicole Dixon-Rochester; Jhaniele Fowler; Crystal Plummer; Rebekah Robinson; Shamera Sterling; Adean Thomas; Jodi-Ann Ward; Khadijah Williams; Latanya Wilson
