= 1975 World Netball Tournament squads =

Netball players at the 1975 World Netball Tournament

This is a list of netball players at the 1975 World Netball Tournament.

== Squads ==
=== A–N ===
Participating teams and rosters
Australia	England	Fiji	Jamaica	New Zealand	Northern Ireland
Christine Burton (vc); Margaret Caldow (c); Gail Dorrington; Margaret Gollan; Sharon Hayes; Maryanne Kruyer; Norma Plummer; Pam Redmond; Cheryl Stevenson; Betty Taylor	Linda Allison; Pat Cane; Lesley Darby; Madeleine Dwan; Cathy Hickey (vc); Lynne Macdonald; Christine Maylor; Anne Miles (c); Colette Reeder; Maria Stewart; Patricia Watson	Julie Barratt; Rufina Bogisa; Elizabeth Freeman; Sera Heritage; Veniana Labalaba; Viki Marseu; Luisa Nansen; Dorothy Shankar; Elizabeth Shankar; Mere Rogica; Arieta Rokowada; Aliti Vularewa	Babagene Barrett; Brenda Brown; Pauline Burton; Joy Charles; Molly DaCosta (vc); Janet Johnson; Dorothy Lotry; Vilma McDonald; Sonia Nissen (c); Marlene Moodie; Sonia Sewell	Maxine Blomquist; Lynne Burney; Beth Carnie; Frances Granger; Deborah Fisher; Lyn Parker (vc); Shirley Langrope (c); Millie Munro; Christine Pietzner; Georgie Salter; Anne Taylor; Yvonne Willering	Lorreta Coyle; Elizabeth Donegan; Jill Finlay; Ann Jeffrey; Valerie Lyttle; June McGregor; Anne McIvor; Barbara Millar; Anne O'Doherty; Sheelagh O'Prey; Regina Osborne; June Wightman (c)
Head Coach: Joyce Brown	Head Coach: Mary French	Head Coach: Rosalie Patton	Head Coach: Jo Wigman	Head Coach: Lois Muir	Head Coach: Maureen Mawhinney
Manager: Yvette Auckett		Manager: Iliana Nasiki Waqanaceva		Manager: Doreen Hes	

=== O–Z ===
Participating teams and rosters
Papua New Guinea	Scotland	Singapore	Trinidad and Tobago	Wales
Annie Age; Hoge Baeua; Kari Dadi; Rebe Gabe; C. Hard; Elizabeth Pidik; Moi Poro; Lautoc Roy; Vietu Rumery; Kari Simoi	Elizabeth Church (Hutchison); Jane Elliot (Lavery); Marie Fairie (c); Jane Hughes; Joan Hughes; Marie McDade; Kathleen McGettrick; Liz McPheely (Wilson); Marian O'Sullivan (McConnochie); Yvonne Sharratt (McCallum) (vc); Helen Speirs (Whiteford); Anna Telfer (Livingstone)	Belinda Ang; Sylvelin Heng; Elsie Ho; Lim Sok Hoon; Ong Kay; Yap Hui Kim; Winnie Tan; Marian Tay; Rosalind Tay; Tan Chin Sien; Lee Bee Wah	Naomi Babb; Janet Bailey (vc); Enid Browne; Angela Burke; Peggy Castanada; Cyrenia Charles; Angela Drayton; Veronica McDonald; Sandra Pascal; Sherril Peters; Jean Pierre (c); Althea Thomas; Jennifer Williams	Jane Bradshaw; Carol Charrington; Elizabeth Daley; Margaret Evans; Barbara Godwin; Denise Hughes; Barbara Jarosz; Christine Lewis; Lesley Owen; Jennifer Sealey (c); Andrea Williams; Christine Williams (c)
Head Coach: Amy Dobbie	Head Coach: Lena Fraser	Head Coach: Cynthia Naidu	Head Coach: Lystra Lewis	Head Coach: Wendy White
Manager: Grace Usae	Manager:	Manager: Tan Hoay Djin; Assistant coach: Swee Maye Lin	Manager:	Manager: Anne Roberts
