= Ann Rankin =

New Zealand netball player

Personal information
- Full name: (Née: Boelee)
- Born: 1 December 1940 (age 85)
- Height: 1.70 m (5 ft 7 in)

Netball career
- Playing position: C
Years	National team	Caps
1967	New Zealand	6
Medal record
Representing New Zealand
World Netball Tournament
Gold medal – first place	1967 Perth	Tournament

Ann Rankin is a former New Zealand netball international who played on six occasions for New Zealand, being part of the team that won the 1967 World Netball Tournament.

== Career ==
Rankin (née Boelee) was born on 1 December 1940. She played her early netball with Canterbury before being selected for the Silver Ferns, the national netball team, in 1967. Coached by Taini Jamison and with Judy Blair as captain, New Zealand won its first world cup at the 1967 World Netball Tournament. The team won all seven of its matches, with the first, against South Africa, being Rankin's debut as a Silver Fern. In the tournament, the gold medal was secured with a 40–34 victory over Australia, the main rivals. Rankin was the 38th person to have been selected for the team and she played in the centre (C) position.

The 1967 world championship team was inducted into the New Zealand Sports Hall of Fame in 1996.
