= Billie Irwin =

New Zealand netball player

Personal information
- Born: 10 May 1942
- Died: 4 May 2025 (aged 82)

Netball career
| Years | Club team | Apps |

Billie Irwin (1942–2025) was a former New Zealand netball international. She was a member of the New Zealand team at the 1967 World Netball Tournament, when New Zealand won the tournament for the first time.

== Netball career ==
Billie Irwin was born on 10 May 1942. She played netball for Rotorua, as one of a formidable defensive pairing with Tilly Vercoe, which was known as "Billie and Tilly". The coach of Rotorua was Taini Jamison and she picked the pair to be in the national team when she became its head coach. Beating Australia 40–34 in its final match, New Zealand won the 1967 World Netball Tournament, its first win in the world championships. Irwin and Vercoe came to be known as "The Black Wall", because of their defence and the colours worn by the team.

The 1967 World Netball Tournament team was inducted into the New Zealand Sports Hall of Fame in 1996.

== Death ==
Irwin died on 4 May 2025.
