= Anne Clark (netball) =

Australian netball administrator

Anne Clark BEM

President of the New South Wales Women's Basketball Association
- In office 1950–1979

President of the All Australia Netball Association
- Incumbent
- Assumed office 1955, 1960, 1966, 1972, 1978

Personal details
- Born: Anne Evelyn Clark; 16 August 1903 Waterloo, New South Wales
- Died: 12 June 1983 (aged 79) Singapore
- Awards: British Empire Medal

Anne Evelyn Clark BEM was an Australian netball administrator, umpire and coach. Between 1950 and 1979 she served as President of the New South Wales Women's Basketball Association. Between 1955 and 1978, she also served five terms as President of the All Australia Netball Association. Clark umpired at the 1967 and 1975 World Netball Tournament. In 1975 she was awarded the British Empire Medal and in 2009 was inducted into the Australian Netball Hall of Fame. Clark died on 12 June 1983 in Singapore while attending the 1983 World Netball Tournament. She was cremated in Sydney.

== Early life, family and employment ==
Clark was born on 16 August 1903 in Waterloo, Sydney. She was the third of five children. Her parents were George Cornelius Clark, a sewerage labourer, and his wife Martha (née Doidge). They were both originally from Victoria. Clark attended Redfern Superior Public School until she was 14. She lived with her parents in Waterloo until the late 1930s. Between 1919 and 1963, she worked in the personnel department of a W.D. & H.O. Wills cigarette factory. Clark participated in a range of sports and served as president of the company's sports club for twelve years. In 1941, during World War II she briefly enlisted in the Women's Auxiliary Australian Air Force but she was discharged on compassionate grounds after her mother died. After her retirement, she lived on the North Shore.

== Netball career ==
=== Netball NSW ===
After breaking her ankle during her first season playing netball, Clark decided to concentrate on umpiring and coaching. In 1924, she joined the Sydney City Girls' Amateur Sports Association. When this organisation changed its name to the New South Wales Women's Basketball Association, she became a vice-president. Between 1950 and 1979 she served as President of the NSWWBA. During her time as president, she campaigned to establish district associations throughout the state. She also served as manager, coach and selector for NSW teams in the Australian National Netball Championships. She encouraged the association to acquire its own headquarters which were subsequently named in her honour. Between 1980 and 2014, the association's headquarters were based at the Anne Clark Centre in Lidcombe. It was officially opened on 11 October 1980. In December 2014, Netball New South Wales moved to its current home at Netball Central, Sydney Olympic Park.

=== Netball Australia ===
Between 1955 and 1978, Clark served five terms (1955, 1960, 1966, 1972 and 1978) as President of the All Australia Netball Association.

=== Umpire ===
In 1931, Clark was awarded her all All Australian Umpire Badge. In 1938 she umpired the first netball Test between Australia and New Zealand. She also umpired during the 1948 series between Australia and New Zealand, during Australia's 1956 tour of England, Scotland and Ceylon and during the 1967 and 1975 World Netball Tournaments. Clarke also helped with the development of netball in Papua New Guinea, making four umpiring tours there. She also umpired at the 1966 and 1969 South Pacific Games. In 1972, aged 69, Clark was still umpiring senior matches in the Australian National Netball Championships.

== Anne Clark Service Awards ==
In 1976, the Anne Clark Service Award was introduced in her honour. The award recognises individuals who have given at least ten years of outstanding service to netball in New South Wales.

== Honours ==
=== Individual awards ===
Year	Award
1931	All Australian Umpire Badge
1964	All Australian Service Award
1968	Netball NSW Life Member
1975	British Empire Medal
19??	Netball NSW Hall of Fame
2009	Australian Netball Hall of Fame

== Reading ==
- Dunbar, Judy, 1929-1989: 60 Years of Netball in New South Wales, Netball New South Wales, Sydney, 1989
- Hyland, Deirdre, "Little Anne" : a biography of Anne Clarke, B.E.M., N.S.W. Netball Association, Sydney, 1987.
