= Margaret Filippini =

New Zealand netball player (1946–2003)

Personal information
- Full name: Margaret Faye Filippini (Née: Gardiner)
- Born: 1 August 1946
- Died: 16 August 2003 (aged 57) Rotorua, New Zealand
- Occupation: Schoolteacher
- Height: 1.70 m (5 ft 7 in)
- School: Southland Girls' High School

Netball career
- Playing positions: GS, GA
Years	National team	Caps
1967	New Zealand	1
Medal record
Representing New Zealand
World Netball Tournament
Gold medal – first place	1967 Perth	Tournament

Margaret Faye Filippini (née Gardiner; 1 August 1946 – 16 August 2003) was a former New Zealand netball international. She was a member of the New Zealand team at the 1967 World Netball Tournament, when New Zealand won the tournament for the first time.

== Early life ==
Born Margaret Faye Gardiner on 1 August 1946, Filippini was the daughter of John Robert and Fannie Carnegy Gardiner. She was educated at Southland Girls' High School, and was the goal attack in the school's netball team when they won the South Island schools netball tournament at Timaru in 1963. She went on to become a schoolteacher, following in the footsteps of her father who was a school headmaster.

== Netball career ==
=== Domestic ===
Gardiner played representative netball for Southland at the national championships in 1962, and after the tournament was named as a trialist for the New Zealand team to compete at the 1963 World Netball Tournament. At the South Island tournament in August 1963, she was described as being a "resourceful forward" in Southland's win over Otago, and later that month at the conclusion of the New Zealand championships she was named in the South Island team for the annual inter-island match. Having moved to Otago, she again made the South Island team in 1964; her play at goal attack in the inter-island match "proved much too skilful for the individualistic tactics of the North team", and she gave "capable support" to goal shooter Joan Martin. In 1965, Gardiner was captain of the Otago representative team at the national championships and once again gained selection for the South Island team. Back playing for Southland in 1966, she was one of 21 players named as trialists for the national team to travel to the 1967 World Netball Tournament.

Gardiner again represented Southland at the New Zealand championships in 1968.

=== International ===
After trials in March 1967, Gardiner was selected for the New Zealand national netball team that travelled to Australia and competed in that year's world championships in Perth. At the tournament, Gardiner struggled to break into the first-choice team for New Zealand—with Joan Harnett and Mirth Solomon preferred in the circle—and only played in one match, against Singapore. She did, however, appear in pre-tournament tour games against Northern Tasmania and Western Australia.

The 1967 world championship team was inducted into the New Zealand Sports Hall of Fame in 1996.

== Later life and death ==
Gardiner married Douglas James Filippini, and they had one child. They later separated, and Douglas Filippini, a lawyer, was convicted of fraud and sentenced to nine months in jail in 1979, and struck off as a barrister and solicitor the following year.

Filippini died at her home in Rotorua on 16 August 2003.
