= Robati =

Robati may refer to:

- Elisa Robati, New Zealand netball player and coach
- Pride Petterson-Robati, Cook Islands rugby league footballer
- Pupuke Robati (1925-2009), Prime Minister of the Cook Islands
- TC Robati, New Zealand rugby league footballer
- Robati, Iran, a village in Razavi Khorasan Province
- Robati Gharbatha, a village in Razavi Khorasan Province
- Robati Shahzadeh, a village in Razavi Khorasan Province
