= Mirth Solomon =

New Zealand netball player (1939–2023)

Personal information
- Full name: Mirth Solomon (née Te Moananui)
- Born: 22 April 1939 Paeroa, New Zealand
- Died: 30 October 2023 (aged 84)
- Occupation: Schoolteacher
- Height: 1.73 m (5 ft 8 in)
- Spouse: Roger Solomon (m. 1964; died 2002)
- Children: 2
- School: Paeroa District High School; Queen Victoria School

Netball career
- Playing position: GS
Years	National team	Caps
1963–1967	New Zealand	9
Medal record
Representing New Zealand
World Netball Tournament
Gold medal – first place	1967 Perth	Tournament
Silver medal – second place	1963 Eastbourne	Tournament

Mirth Solomon (née Te Moananui; 22 April 1939 – 30 October 2023) was a New Zealand netball international. She competed for New Zealand in the 1963 and 1967 World Netball Tournaments, winning a silver and gold medal. After retiring, she played an important role with Netball Rotorua, retiring in 2016 after 15 years as its president. She was inducted into the Māori Sports Hall of Fame in 2003.

== Early life and family ==
Solomon was born Mirth Te Moananui on 22 April 1939 in Paeroa, one of 11 children of Alma Thwaites and Eruini Taharua Te Moananui. Of Māori descent, her iwi (tribal) affiliation is to Tainui. After attending Paeroa District High School, where she participated in a wide range of sports, she was sent in 1956 to Auckland to board at Queen Victoria School, an Anglican school for Māori girls that closed in 2001. In 1958, she went on to study at Auckland Teachers' Training College, obtaining teaching qualifications. Her first teaching job was at the Pukekohe Māori School and this was followed by schools in Pukehina and Mamaku. She married Roger Solomon, a rugby coach, in 1964 and they had two daughters.

== Netball career ==
Solomon represented Auckland at under-21 level in 1959. She was selected for the Auckland 'A' team in 1960 before moving to the Rotorua 'A' team. She took part in selection trials for the national team in 1962 and was selected at goal shooter for the team in 1963, travelling by ship to England to take part in the 1963 World Netball Tournament, which were held in Eastbourne. New Zealand won a silver medal, losing to Australia by one goal in their final match. In the 1967 World Netball Tournament, she was a member of the team that won the gold medal. Solomon, who had given birth not long before the event, was the tournament's top scorer. She became known for leading the team in a victory haka, a Māori ceremonial dance.

After retiring from competition, Solomon continued to be involved with netball in the Rotorua area. In 2001, she succeeded Taini Jamison, who had been her coach for the 1967 World Netball Tournament, as president of Netball Rotorua, relinquishing the position in 2016. She also became a senior-level umpire. In 2003, she was inducted into the Māori Sports Hall of Fame. The 1967 world championship team was inducted into the New Zealand Sports Hall of Fame in 1996.

== Later career ==
Solomon continued to teach, at Rotorua Girls' High School in 1965, where she taught physical education and geography, and then Sunset Intermediate School in Rotorua from 1966 to 1968. In 1969, Kaitao Intermediate School was established in Rotorua and she became a founding member of staff, retiring as deputy principal in 2005. Her husband, Roger, died in 2002.

Solomon died on 30 October 2023, at the age of 84.
