= Sheila Morrow =

Welsh field hockey player (born 1947)

Sheila Morrow OBE (born 1947) is the president of Great Britain Hockey since 2017. During her field hockey career, Morrow played for the Wales women's national field hockey team and Great Britain women's national field hockey team between the 1960s and 1980s. After playing in over 100 matches, Morrow umpired field hockey matches before becoming an official for the International Hockey Federation. While with the FIH from 2004 to 2017, Morrow was a judge in the women's field hockey events at the 2008 Summer Olympics and 2012 Summer Olympics. Before starting her executive position with Great Britain Hockey, Morrow worked at the Sports Council for Wales and Sport England between the 1980s to 2000s. Morrow was inducted into the Welsh Sports Hall of Fame in 1990 and became an Officer of the British Empire at the 2019 Queen's Birthday Honours.

== Biography ==
In 1947, Morrow was born in Bangor, Gwynedd. Morrow started her field hockey career with the Wales women's national field hockey team in 1967. After becoming a high school gym teacher in Cardiff, Wales the following year, Morrow simultaneously taught gym and played field hockey until 1983. As a player, Morrow appeared in five world championships during her 112 matches with Wales and captained the team from 1982 to 1984. On the Great Britain women's national field hockey team from 1978 to 1984, Morrow played in 24 matches and was the team's captain in 1981 and 1982.

Outside of her playing career, Morrow started umpiring field hockey matches in 1987 and appeared in 30 matches. From 2004 to 2017, Morrow appeared in multiple International Hockey Federation competitions as an official. While with the FIH, Morrow judged at the women's events during the 2008 Summer Olympics and 2012 Summer Olympics. Morrow also worked at the 2004 Women's Hockey Champions Trophy and 2010 Women's Hockey World Cup as a technical officer. In executive positions, Morrow joined the development department for the Sports Council for Wales in 1983 before being becoming in charge of services for Sport England in 1991. Morrow remained in her position with Sport England until 2004. In 2017, Morrow was named the president of Great Britain Hockey.

== Awards and honours ==
In 1990, Morrow was inducted into the Welsh Sports Hall of Fame. For awards, Morrow was named an Officer of the British Empire at the 2019 Queen's Birthday Honours.
