= Tilly Hirst =

New Zealand netball player (1941–2021)

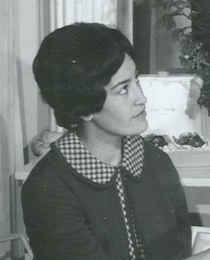
- Vercoe in 1965

Personal information
- Full name: Tilly Titihuia Rangimatau Hirst (née: Vercoe)
- Born: 17 September 1941 New Zealand
- Died: 4 June 2021 (aged 79)
- Height: 5 ft 9 in (175 cm)

Netball career
- Playing positions: GD, WD, GK
Years	National team	Caps
1967–71	New Zealand	19
Medal record
Representing New Zealand
World Netball Tournament
Gold medal – first place	1967 Perth	Team
Silver medal – second place	1971 Kingston	Team

Tilly Titihuia Rangimatau Hirst (née Vercoe; 17 September 1941 – 4 June 2021) was a New Zealand netball international. She was a member of the New Zealand team that won the 1967 World Netball Tournament.

== Early life ==
Hirst was born Tilly Titihuia Rangimatau Vercoe on 17 September 1941, the daughter of Ruhina and Raharuhi Vercoe. Of Māori descent, she was affiliated with Ngāti Pikiao, Ngāti Kea Ngāti Tuarā, and Ngāti Manawa. She was educated at Rotorua Girls' High School from 1955 to 1958.

== Netball career ==
At 1.75 metres (5 ft 9 in) in height, Vercoe was regarded as being a tall netballer in her day, and was known as a dynamic defender, playing as a goal keeper, goal defence or wing defence. She represented the Rotorua provincial team between 1960 and 1972, winning the North Island provincial championships every year from 1962 to 1967, except 1963, and was a member of the North Island team from 1963 to 1966, 1968 to 1970 and in 1972.

Vercoe was first selected to play for New Zealand at the 1967 World Netball Tournament, and was also named as the team's vice-captain, with Joan Harnett as captain. At that tournament, New Zealand won all seven of their matches, and were crowned world champions. In 1969, Vercoe toured Australia with the New Zealand netball team, with the two-test series being shared 1–1. She retired as a player after the 1971 World Netball Tournament, at which New Zealand lost just one match, against Australia 48–42, to finish as runners-up. Over her career, Vercoe played 19 international games for New Zealand.

In 1996, the 1967 World Netball Tournament team was inducted into the New Zealand Sports Hall of Fame. In 2018, Hirst was inducted into the Rotorua Boys' High School Hall of Fame, which includes people who attended the school when it was the co-educational Rotorua High School.

== Later life and death ==
After retiring from netball, Hirst worked at the Rotorua police station, undertaking clerical duties. She was married to Peter Hirst, who died in 2013. The couple were active members of the Rotorua Baháʼí community, with Peter Hirst serving as the group's secretary. Tilly Hirst died on 4 June 2021, aged 79.
