= 1975 World Netball Tournament =

International netball tournament hosted by New Zealand

Tournament details
- Host country: New Zealand
- City: Auckland
- Venue: Windmill Road Courts
- Dates: 22 August–4 September 1975
- Teams: 11

Final positions
- Champions: Australia (3rd title)
- Runners-up: England
- Third place: New Zealand

Tournament statistics
- Matches played: 55

The 1975 World Netball Tournament was the fourth Netball World Cup tournament. It was organised by the International Federation of Women's Basketball and Netball Associations. It featured eleven teams playing a series of netball test matches in Auckland in August and September 1975. With a team coached by Joyce Brown and captained by Margaret Caldow, Australia won the tournament after winning nine of their ten matches. While the first three tournaments had been dominated by Australia and New Zealand, a strong England side made 1975 the closest tournament so far. In Round 9, England defeated New Zealand 39–38, a result which saw them eventually finish as silver medallists. It was the first time England had beaten New Zealand in a Netball World Cup. In Round 10, Australia effectively secured the title with a 41–36 win over England. They confirmed it in Round 11 with a 34 all draw against New Zealand.

== Teams, head coaches and captains ==
Team	Head coach	Captain
Australia	Joyce Brown	Margaret Caldow
England	Mary French	Anna Miles
Fiji	Rosalie Patton	
Jamaica	Jo Wigman	Sonia Nissen
Kenya	^{(Note 1)}	
New Zealand	Lois Muir	Shirley Langrope
Northern Ireland	Maureen Mawhinney	June Wightman
Papua New Guinea	Amy Dobbie	
Scotland	Lena Fraser	Marie Fairie
Singapore	Cynthia Naidu	
Trinidad and Tobago	Lystra Lewis	Jean Pierre
Wales	Wendy White	Jennifer Sealey; Christine Williams

== Match officials ==
Umpire	Association
Fay Bevan	Australia
Anne Clark	Papua New Guinea ^{(Note 2)}
Joyce Haynes	England
Dawn Jones	New Zealand
Kathleen Leonard	Northern Ireland
Swee Maye Lin	Singapore
Maureen Milner	Wales
Leila Robinson	Jamaica
Judith F. Russell	Fiji ^{(Note 3)}
Anne Stoddart	Scotland

== Matches ==
=== Round 1 ===
Friday, 22 August	New Zealand	28–9	World 7 ^{(Note 4)}	Court 1
14:00	Beth Carnie 21; Anne Taylor 7		Janet Johnson 5 Chris Maylor 4

Friday, 22 August	Jamaica	41–36	Scotland	Court 2
14:05	Marlene Moodie 29; Babagene Barrett 7		Jane Elliot 22; Jane Hughes 14

Friday, 22 August	England	67–12	Singapore	Court 3
14:05	Judi Heath 56; Pat Cane 11		Ong Kay 8 Lee Bee Wah 14

Friday, 22 August	Fiji	38–35	Northern Ireland	Court 1
15:30	Mere Rogica 21/42 (50%); Elizabeth Freeman 17		Anne O'Doherty 19; Anne McIvor 16

Friday, 22 August	Trinidad and Tobago	48–36	Wales	Court 2
15:35	Jean Pierre 33/47 (70%); Veronica McDonald 15/22 (68%)		Lesley Owen 23; Christine Lewis 13

Friday, 22 August	Australia	86–12	Papua New Guinea	Court 3
15:35	Margaret Caldow 44; Sharon Hayes 42		Elizabeth Pidik 7 Lautoc Roy 5

=== Round 2 ===
Saturday, 23 August	Wales	53–27	Fiji	Court 1
13:00	Christine Lewis 31; Lesley Owen 22		Elizabeth Freeman 16; Luisa Nansen 11

Saturday, 23 August	Trinidad and Tobago	64–22	Northern Ireland	Court 2
13:15	Cyrenia Charles 37; Jean Pierre 27		Anne O'Doherty 13; Anne McIvor 9

Saturday, 23 August	New Zealand	58–23	Jamaica	Court 1
14:30	Frances Granger 38; Beth Carnie 20		Marlene Moodie 18; Sonia Sewell 4 Babagene Barrett 1

Saturday, 23 August	England	114–16	Papua New Guinea	Court 2
14:45	Christine Maylor 77; Judi Heath 37/48 (77%)		Moi Poro 10; Elizabeth Pidik 6

Saturday, 23 August	Australia	65–10	Singapore	Court 3
14:45	Margaret Caldow 38; Margaret Gollan 27		Ong Kay 9 ?? 1

=== Round 3 ===
Monday, 25 August	Scotland	53–35	Singapore	Court 2
13:15

Monday, 25 August	Jamaica	38–31	Wales	Court 3
13:15

Monday, 25 August	Australia	45–37	Trinidad and Tobago	Court 1
14:30

Monday, 25 August	Fiji	50–38	Papua New Guinea	Court 2
14:45

Monday, 25 August	New Zealand	80–11	Northern Ireland	Court 3
14:45

=== Round 4 ===
Tuesday, 26 August	Trinidad and Tobago	55–32	Scotland	Court 1
13:00	Jean Pierre 32; Cyrenia Charles 23		Anna Telfer 20; J. Hughes 12

Tuesday, 26 August	Australia	66–20	Northern Ireland	Court 2
13:15	Margaret Caldow 33; Margaret Gollan 33		Anne McIvor 12; Valerie Lyttle 8

Tuesday, 26 August	New Zealand	96–25	Fiji	Court 3
13:15	Beth Carnie 67; Anne Taylor 29		Luisa Nansen 18; Rufina Bogisa 7

Tuesday, 26 August	England	59–15	Jamaica	Court 2
14:45	Judi Heath 45; Patricia Watson 14		Marlene Moodie 9 Babagene Barrett 6

Tuesday, 26 August	Wales	61–14	Papua New Guinea	Court 3
14:45	Lesley Owen 38; Andrea Williams 23		Lautoc Roy 10; Elizabeth Pidik 4

=== Round 5 ===
Wednesday, 27 August	Northern Ireland	36–20	Singapore	Court 1
13:00	Valerie Lyttle 24; Anne McIvor 12		Ong Kay 16; Sylvelin Heng 4

Wednesday, 27 August	New Zealand	88–16	Wales	Court 2
13:15	Beth Carnie 51; Frances Granger 37		Lesley Owen 12; Christine Lewis 4

Wednesday, 27 August	Jamaica	52–24	Papua New Guinea	Court 3
13:15	Marlene Moodie 31; Sonia Sewell 13; Janet Johnson 8		Moi Poro 14; C. Hard 10

Wednesday, 27 August	England	39–37	Trinidad and Tobago	Court 1
14:30	Judi Heath 36; Pat Cane 3		Jean Pierre 24; Cyrenia Charles 13

Wednesday, 27 August	Australia	65–24	Scotland	Court 3
14:45	Sharon Hayes 34; Margaret Gollan 31		Jane Elliot 15; J. Hughes 9

=== Round 6 ===
Thursday, 28 August	England	56–28	Wales	Court 1
13:00	Judi Heath 35; Patricia Watson 21		Christine Lewis 22; Lesley Owen 6

Thursday, 28 August	New Zealand	64–17	Singapore	Court 3
13:15	Frances Granger 37; Anne Taylor 23; Maxine Blomquist 4		Ong Kay 14; Sylvelin Heng 3

Thursday, 28 August	Australia	62–32	Jamaica	Court 1
14:30	Margaret Caldow 44; Sharon Hayes 42		Marlene Moodie 16; Babagene Barrett 16

Thursday, 28 August	Scotland	49–47	Fiji	Court 2
14:45	Jane Elliot 26; J. Hughes 23		Luisa Nansen 32; Elizabeth Freeman 15

Thursday, 28 August	Trinidad and Tobago	82–17	Papua New Guinea	Court 3
14:45	Veronica McDonald 49; Peggy Castanada 33		Elizabeth Pidik 11; Lautoc Roy 6

=== Round 7 ===
Friday, 29 August	Northern Ireland	40–30	Papua New Guinea	Court 1
13:00

Friday, 29 August	Australia	65–20	Fiji	Court 2
13:15

Friday, 29 August	England	61–24	Scotland	Court 3
13:15

Friday, 29 August	New Zealand	49–33	Trinidad and Tobago	Court 1
14:30

Friday, 29 August	Jamaica	56–31	Singapore	Court 3
14:45

=== Round 8 ===
Monday, 1 September	Trinidad and Tobago	53–50	Jamaica	Court 1
13:00	Cyrenia Charles 25; Jean Pierre 23		Marlene Moodie 33; Babagene Barrett 17

Monday, 1 September	Wales	53–22	Singapore	Court 2
13:15	Andrea Williams 29; Christine Lewis 24		Ong Kay 21; Sylvelin Heng 1

Monday, 1 September	Scotland	56–33	Northern Ireland	Court 3
13:15	Jane Elliot 30; J. Hughes 26		Anne McIvor 20; Valerie Lyttle 13

Monday, 1 September	New Zealand	103–13	Papua New Guinea	Court 2
14:45	Beth Carnie 65/96 (68%); Anne Taylor 38/62 (61%)		Lautoc Roy 8 Moi Poro 7

Monday, 1 September	England	82–23	Fiji	Court 3
14:45	Christine Maylor 57; Patricia Watson 25		Mere Rogica 13; Elizabeth Freeman 10

=== Round 9 ===
Tuesday, 2 September	Scotland	60–38	Papua New Guinea	Court 1
13:00	Anna Telfer 31; J. Hughes 29		Lautoc Roy 27; C. Hard 11

Tuesday, 2 September	Fiji	62–39	Singapore	Court 2
13:15	Luisa Nansen 35; Elizabeth Freeman 17		Ong Kay 31; Sylvelin Heng 8

Tuesday, 2 September	Australia	67–14	Wales	Court 3
13:15	Margaret Caldow 44; Sharon Hayes 42		Christine Lewis 9 Andrea Williams 5

Tuesday, 2 September	New Zealand	38–39	England	Court 1
14:30	Beth Carnie 24; Frances Granger 14		Judi Heath 31; Patricia Watson 8

Tuesday, 2 September	Jamaica	60–27	Northern Ireland	Court 2
14:45	Marlene Moodie 40; Babagene Barrett 20		Anne O'Doherty 18; Valerie Lyttle 9

=== Round 10 ===
Wednesday, 3 September	Singapore	45–35	Papua New Guinea	Court 1
13:00	Ong Kay 39; Sylvelin Heng 6		Lautoc Roy 22; Elizabeth Pidik 13

Wednesday, 3 September	New Zealand	81–35	Scotland	Court 2
13:15	Beth Carnie 48; Frances Granger 33		Jane Hughes 19; Jane Elliot 16

Wednesday, 3 September	Trinidad and Tobago	76–18	Fiji	Court 3
13:15	Jean Pierre 41; Veronica McDonald 35		Mere Rogica 13; Elizabeth Freeman 5

Wednesday, 3 September	Australia	41–36	England	Court 1
14:30	Margaret Caldow 26; Sharon Hayes 15		Judi Heath 23; Patricia Watson 13

Wednesday, 3 September	Wales	35–26	Northern Ireland	Court 2
14:45	Christine Lewis 20; Lesley Owen 15		Anne O'Doherty 15; Anne McIvor 11

=== Round 11 ===
Thursday, 4 September	Jamaica	60–20	Fiji	Court 1
9:30	Babagene Barrett 35; Marlene Moodie 25		Luisa Nansen 21; Elizabeth Freeman 9

Thursday, 4 September	England	71–21	Northern Ireland	Court 2
9:45	Christine Maylor 59; Pat Cane 12		Anne O'Doherty 12; Anne McIvor 9

Thursday, 4 September	Scotland	37–37	Wales	Court 1
11:00	J. Hughes 22; Jane Elliot 15		Christine Lewis 25; Andrea Williams 12

Thursday, 4 September	Trinidad and Tobago	59–17	Singapore	Court 2
11:15	Cyrenia Charles 34; Peggy Castanada 25		Ong Kay 15; Sylvelin Heng 2

Thursday, 4 September	New Zealand	34–34	Australia	Court 1
14:00	Beth Carnie 19; Frances Granger 15		Sharon Hayes 19; Margaret Caldow 15	Umpires: Miss Haynes (England); Leila Robinson (Jamaica)

== Final table ==
Pos	Team	P	W	D	L	GF	GA	GD	Pts
1st place, gold medalist(s)	Australia	10	9	1	0	596	239	+357	19
2nd place, silver medalist(s)	England	10	9	0	1	624	255	+369	18
3rd place, bronze medalist(s)	New Zealand	10	8	1	1	691	248	+444	17
4	Trinidad and Tobago	10	7	0	3	544	335	+209	14
5	Jamaica	10	6	0	4	427	401	+26	12
6	Wales	10	4	1	5	366	423	-57	9
7	Scotland	10	4	1	5	406	493	-87	9
8	Fiji	10	3	0	7	330	593	-263	6
9	Northern Ireland	10	2	0	8	271	520	-249	4
10	Singapore	10	1	0	9	238	540	-302	2
11	Papua New Guinea	10	0	0	10	239	693	-454	0

== Medallists ==
Gold	Silver	Bronze
Australia; Coach: Joyce Brown	England; Coach: Mary French	New Zealand; Coach: Lois Muir
Chris Burton; Margaret Caldow (c); Gail Dorrington; Margaret Gollan; Sharon Hayes; Maryanne Kruyer; Norma Plummer; Pam Redmond; Cheryl Stevenson; Betty Taylor	Linda Allison; Pat Cane; Lesley Darby; Madeleine Dwan; Cathy Hickey; Lynne Macdonald; Christine Maylor; Anne Miles (c); Colette Reeder; Maria Stewart; Patricia Watson	Maxine Blomquist; Beth Carnie; Frances Granger; Lyn Parker (vc); Shirley Langrope (c); Millie Munro; Christine Pietzner; Georgie Salter; Anne Taylor; Yvonne Willering

== Notes ==
- ^1 Kenya were included in the tournament programme. However they withdrew before the tournament started.
- ^2 Anne Clark was an Australian umpire representing Papua New Guinea.
- ^3 Judith F. Russell was a New Zealand umpire representing Fiji.
- ^4 In Round 1, Kenya were replaced by an invitational team, a World 7, that featured squad players from other competing teams. These included Jamaica's Janet Johnson and England's Christine Maylor.
