= Barry College =

- Type: Further Education College
- Students: 10,000
- Location: Barry, Wales
- Campus: Colcot Road, Barry
- Website: barry.ac.uk

Barry College was a Further Education college in Barry, Wales which merged with Coleg Glan Hafren in September 2011 to form the new Cardiff and Vale College. The college admits approximately 10,000 students per year. It is partnered with the University of South Wales. Barry College offered many courses, including courses in: Languages; Hairdressing and Beauty; Electrical Engerneering; and Computing courses. There is also an aircraft engineering course located near Cardiff International Airport which offers BTEC qualifications in the subject.

It was announced in 2010 that Barry College would be merging with Coleg Glan Hafren to form the new Cardiff and Vale College. This was a result of the Welsh Assembly Government encouraging colleges in Wales to collaborate in order to maximise benefits for students.

In September 2011, Barry College merged with Coleg Glan Hafren to form Cardiff and Vale College (Welsh: Coleg Caerdydd a'r Fro) which is now one of the largest colleges in Wales.

== People associated with Barry College ==
- Flora Forster
- Ivette Rodriguez, Puerto Rican actress and singer, graduated from Barry College.
- Wendy White, Welsh netball player, coach, administrator
