= 1967 World Netball Tournament =

International netball tournament hosted by Australia

Tournament details
- Host country: Australia
- City: Perth
- Venue: Matthews Netball Centre
- Dates: 14–26 August 1967
- Teams: 8

Final positions
- Champions: New Zealand (1st title)
- Runners-up: Australia
- Third place: South Africa

Tournament statistics
- Matches played: 28
- Top scorer(s): Mirth Solomon

The 1967 World Netball Tournament was the second Netball World Cup. It featured eight teams playing a series of netball test matches at the Matthews Netball Centre in Perth, Western Australia in August 1967. With a team coached by Taini Jamison and captained by Judy Blair, New Zealand won the tournament after winning all seven of their matches. Joan Harnett emerged as the star for New Zealand and was named player of the tournament. Mirth Solomon, who was the tournament's highest goal scorer, led the team in a victory haka. The key victory came in Round 7 against the reigning champions, Australia, with a 40–34 win ensuring New Zealand won the gold. Arguably, the toughest challenge New Zealand faced during the tournament was against eventual bronze medallists South Africa. In 1996, the 1967 New Zealand team was inducted into the New Zealand Sports Hall of Fame.

== Teams, head coaches and captains ==
Team	Head coach	Captain
Australia	Margaret Pewtress	Lynette Moroney Davey
England	Mary French	Marion Lofthouse
Jamaica	Jo Wigman	Avis Collins
New Zealand	Taini Jamison	Judy Blair
Scotland	Katie Pie/Pye	Moira Ord
Singapore	Tan Hoay Djin/Ong Siong Ngo ??	Cynthia Naidu
South Africa		Doreen Otto
Trinidad and Tobago	Lystra Lewis	Enid Browne

== Match officials ==
Umpires included

Umpire	Association
Fay Bevan	Australia
Anne Clark	Australia
Joyce Haynes	England
Lystra Lewis	Trinidad and Tobago
Maureen Milner	Wales
Leila Robinson	Jamaica

== Matches ==
=== Round 1 ===
Monday, 14 August	Australia	60–13	Scotland

Monday, 14 August	New Zealand	41–39	South Africa

Tuesday, 15 August	England	37–2	Singapore

Tuesday, 15 August	Trinidad and Tobago	30–23	Jamaica

=== Round 2 ===
Thursday, 17 August	Australia	35–29	South Africa
	Carole Ann White 25; Heather McLean 10		Marina Klusmann 18; Maudie Laubscher 11

Thursday, 17 August	New Zealand	76–14	Scotland
	Mirth Solomon 54; Joan Harnett 22		E. Gavin 7 N. Cameron 7

Friday, 18 August	England	32–29	Trinidad and Tobago

Friday, 18 August	Jamaica	53–8	Singapore

=== Round 3 ===
Saturday, 19 August	Australia	40–33	Jamaica

Saturday, 19 August	New Zealand	50–24	England

Saturday, 19 August	Scotland	40–26	Singapore

Saturday, 19 August	South Africa	35–32	Trinidad and Tobago

=== Round 4 ===
Tuesday, 22 August	New Zealand	51–20	Jamaica
	Mirth Solomon 34; Joan Harnett 17		H. Edmondson 15; E. Fraser 5

Tuesday, 22 August	Trinidad and Tobago	73–9	Singapore
	J. Moore 43; J. Francis 30		Lee Meng 8 Hp Poh Chun 1

Tuesday, 22 August	Australia	31–22	England
	Carole Ann White 27; Heather McLean 4		Pat Green 12; Joyce Wheeler 10

Tuesday, 22 August	South Africa	50–17	Scotland
	Elbie Joubert 37; Maudie Laubscher 13		E. Gavin 11; A. Davidson 6

=== Round 5 ===
Wednesday, 23 August	England	57–13	Scotland
	Judy Day 33; Joyce Wheeler 24		N. Cameron 12; A. Davidson 1

Wednesday, 23 August	South Africa	26–19	Jamaica
	Marina Klusmann 19; Maudie Laubscher 7		H. Edmondson 7 E. Fraser 6 F. Dalhouse 6

Wednesday, 23 August	Australia	54–17	Singapore
	Elsma Harris 30; Heather McLean 24		Lee Meng 12; Hung Keng 5

Wednesday, 23 August	New Zealand	53–28	Trinidad and Tobago
	Mirth Solomon 31; Joan Harnett 22		J. Moore 15; J. Francis 13

=== Round 6 ===
Friday, 25 August	Australia	33–22	Trinidad and Tobago

Friday, 25 August	South Africa	30–29	England

Friday, 25 August	New Zealand	76–5	Singapore

Friday, 25 August	Jamaica	59–23	Scotland

=== Round 7 ===
Saturday, 26 August	England	48–26	Jamaica

Saturday, 26 August	South Africa	68–10	Singapore

Saturday, 26 August	Trinidad and Tobago	48–23	Scotland

Saturday, 26 August	New Zealand	40–34	Australia
	Mirth Solomon 27; Joan Harnett 13		Carole Ann White 27; Heather McLean 7

== Final table ==
Pos	Team	P	W	L	GF	GA	GD	Pts
1st place, gold medalist(s)	New Zealand	7	7	0	387	164		14
2nd place, silver medalist(s)	Australia	7	6	1	287	176		12
3rd place, bronze medalist(s)	South Africa	7	5	2	277	183		10
4	England	7	4	3	249	181		8
5	Trinidad and Tobago	7	3	4	262	208		6
6	Jamaica	7	2	5	224	226		4
7	Scotland	7	1	6	214	376		2
8	Singapore	7	0	7	77	398		0

== Medallists ==
Gold	Silver	Bronze
New Zealand; Coach: Taini Jamison	Australia; Coach: Margaret Pewtress	South Africa; Coach:
Judy Blair (c); Ann Boelee; Margaret Gardiner; Pam Hamilton; Joan Harnett; Billie Irwin; Sandra James; Elizabeth Rowley; Mirth Solomon; Tilly Vercoe	Chris Burton; Lynette Davey (c); Stella Gollan; Elsma Harris; Maureen Kirsanovs; Heather McLean; Ellen O'Shannassy; Glenyse Suiter; Gaye Switch; Carole Ann White	Alet Charnley; Heloise Ferreira; Margaret Grant; Elbie Joubert; Marina Klusmann; Maudie Laubscher; Tobianna Louw; Doreen Otto (c); Ellie Roberts; Marlene Wagner
