= Welsh Sports Hall of Fame =

Welsh charitable organisation

Coordinates: 51°28′41.73″N 3°10′57.29″W

The Welsh Sports Hall of Fame (WSHOF) is a charitable organisation created to commemorate the sporting achievements and preserve the artefacts of Welsh athletes. It was established in 1980 from the memorabilia collection of Welsh radio commentator G. V. Wynne-Jones. Since 1990, inductees to the exclusive "Roll of Honour" have been chosen annually by a trustees committee comprising representatives from athletics, media, universities and museums. The organisation has also given awards to individuals for outstanding contribution to Welsh sport. In 2018 an extra award was added to commemorate the former chairman, Rhodri Morgan. The first 'Rhodri' was awarded to the City of Cardiff for their outstanding service and commitment to sporting excellence.

== The WSHOF Roll of Honour citation ==
"Inclusion in the Roll of Honour is for those people who, by their achievement and by their example and conduct, in and beyond the sporting arena, have brought distinction to themselves and credit to Wales."

The Hall of Fame exhibition was on permanent exhibition at the Sports Council for Wales, South Glamorgan County Council, and the Museum of Welsh Life until 2009, when it moved to the Millennium Stadium in Cardiff.

The committee of trustees is chaired by Prof Laura McAllister CBE, who took over from the former First Minister, Rhodri Morgan, in 2018 . The WSHOF committee consists of Prof Laura McAllister (chair – appointed 2018), Jeff Andrews (secretary), Dave Cobner, Rob Cole, Carolyn Hitt, Peter Jackson, Dylan Jones, Nicky Piper, Dave Roberts, Clive Williams., Andrew Weeks, Phil Davies, Andrew Walker.

Lynn Davies CBE was appointed as President of the WSHOF in 2018.

== The WSHOF Roll of Honour inductees ==
(* indicates posthumous award)

=== 1990s ===
1990 THE ORIGINALS

- Billy Boston (rugby league)
- David Broome (equestrian)
- Lynn Davies (athletics)
- Jim Driscoll (boxing) *
- Ken Jones (rugby union)
- Sir Harry Llewellyn (equestrian)
- Billy Meredith (association football) *
- Sheila Morrow (field hockey)
- Jack Petersen (boxing)
- Kirsty Wade (athletics)

1991

- Jack Anthony (horse racing) *
- Cliff Jones (rugby union) *
- Cliff Morgan (rugby union)
- Dai Rees (golf) *

1992

- Gerald Davies (rugby union)
- Tanni Grey-Thompson (para athletics)
- George Latham (association football) *
- Ray Reardon (snooker)
- Irene Steer (swimming) *
- Jim Sullivan (rugby league) *
- Eddie Thomas (boxing)
- Jimmy Wilde (boxing) *

1993

- John Charles (association football)
- Paul Radmilovic (water polo) *

1994

- Valerie Davies (swimming)
- Maurice Turnbull (cricket) *
- Freddie Welsh (boxing) *
- J. P. R. Williams (rugby union)

1995

- Jim Alford (athletics)
- Ivor Allchurch (association football)
- Hugh Edwards (rowing) *
- Fulke Walwyn (horse racing) *

1996

- Janet Ackland (bowls)
- Richard Meade (equestrian)
- Howard Winstone (boxing)

1997

- Tommy Farr (boxing) *
- Trevor Ford (association football)
- Chris Hallam (para athletics)
- Fred Keenor (association football) *
- Bleddyn Williams (rugby union)

1998

- Johnnie Clay (cricket) *
- John Disley (athletics)
- Gareth Edwards (rugby union)
- Cliff Jones (association football)
- Lewis Jones (rugby union / league)
- Geoff Lewis (horse racing)
- Jimmy Michael (cycling) *
- Jimmy Murphy (association football) *
- Vicki Thomas (golf)
- Freddie Williams (speedway)

1999

- Horace Blew (association football) *
- Ann Ellis (field hockey)
- Carwyn James (rugby union) *
- Barry John (rugby union)
- Colin Jones (boxing)

=== 2000s ===
2000

- Sir Charles Evans (mountaineering) *
- Teresa John (para athletics)
- Jonathan Jones (powerboating)
- Gus Risman (rugby league) *
- Dick Rees (equestrian) *
- David Watkins (rugby union / league)

2001

- Ronnie Burgess (association football)
- Mervyn Davies (rugby union)
- Nancy Evans (table tennis) *
- Roy Evans (table tennis) *
- Ian Rush (association football)
- David Winters (para athletics)
- Martyn Woodroffe (swimming)

2002

- Audrey Bates (squash/lacrosse) *
- Mal Evans (bowls)
- Steve Jones (athletics)
- Gwyn Nicholls (rugby union) *
- Berwyn Price (athletics)
- Dave Thomas (golf)

2003

- Jonathan Davies (rugby union / league)
- Willie Davies (rugby league / union) *
- John Dawes (rugby union)
- Mark Hughes (association football)
- Nick Whitehead (athletics)

2004

- Trevor Foster (rugby league)
- Terry Griffiths (snooker)
- Bryn Jones (association football) *
- Tony Lewis (cricket)
- Ivor Powell (association football)
- Arthur Whitford (gymnastics) *

2005

- John Gwilliam (rugby union)
- Colin Jackson (athletics)
- Tom Richards (athletics) *
- Steve Robinson (boxing)
- John Toshack (association football)

2006

- Brian Huggett (golf)
- Don Shepherd (cricket)
- Jack Matthews (rugby union)
- Alf Sherwood (association football) *
- Allan Watkins (cricket)

2007

- Arthur Gould (rugby union) *
- Helen Weston (netball)
- Phil Bennett (rugby union)
- Joe Calzaghe (boxing)

2008

- Billy Trew (rugby union) *

2009

- J. J. Williams (rugby union)
- David Roberts (para swimming)
- Clive Sullivan (rugby league) *

=== 2010s ===
2010

- Ian Woosnam (golf)
- Alan Petherbridge (judo)
- Jack Kelsey (association football) *

2011

There were no new entries in 2011.

2012

- Bryn Meredith (rugby union)
- Non Evans (judo / rugby union / wrestling / weightlifting)
- Albert Gladstone (rowing) *
- Cecil Griffiths (athletics) *
- David Jacobs (athletics) *
- John Ainsworth-Davis (athletics) *

2013

- Nicole Cooke (cycling)
- John Harris (para athletics)
- Ron Jones (athletics)
- David Morgan (weightlifting)
- Clive Rowlands (rugby union)

2014

- David Davies (swimming)
- Bob Morgan (diving)
- Denis Reardon (boxing)*
- John Burns (weightlifting)
- Clive Thomas (association football)
- Reg Thomas (athletics)

2015

- Jeff Jones (cricket)
- Simon Jones (cricket)
- Wilf Wooller (cricket / rugby union)
- Steve Barry (athletics)
- Frankie Jones (gymnastics)

2016

- Tom James (rowing)
- Alan Jones (cricket)
- Neville Southall (association football)
- Gary Speed (association football) *

2017

- Christian Malcolm (athletics)
- Graham Price (rugby union)
- Peter Walker (cricket)
- Terry Yorath (association football)

2018

- Roy Francis (rugby league) *
- Becky James (cycling)
- Lynne Thomas (cricket / field hockey)
- Kelly Morgan (badminton)
- Jayne Ludlow (association football)

2019

- Wendy White (netball) *
- Ryan Giggs (association football)
- Michaela Breeze (weightlifting)
- Jazz Carlin (swimming)
- Steve Fenwick (rugby union)

=== 2020s ===
2022

- Helen Jenkins (triathlon)
- Robert Weale (bowles)
- Kevin Ratcliffe (association football)
- Maurice Richards (rugby union / league)
- Georgia Davies (swimming)
- Mike Davies (tennis) *
- Ted Peterson (baseball) *

2023

- John Devereux (rugby)
- Suzy Drane (netball)
- Helen Ward (association football)
- Leah Wilkinson (field hockey)

2025

- Dai Llewellin
- Tori James
- Matthew Maynard
- Charles Bruce *
- Geoff Bruce
- Joe Erskine
- Gomer Lloyd
- Laura Deas
- Victoria Thornley
- Dai Greene

2026

- Allan Martin
- Terry Cobner
- Giorgio Chinaglia *
- Parry Thomas *
- Lord Swansea *
- David Phelps

== The Lord Brooks Award for Outstanding Services to Welsh Sport ==
This award was formerly called the WSH0F Special Award for Outstanding Services to Welsh Sport.

2001 Lord Brooks (boxing / WSHOF)	2002 Ceri O'Donnell (field hockey)	2015 Dave Cobner (student sport)
2016 Laura McAllister (football / Sport Wales)	2016 Geoff Bray (WSHOF)	2019 Steve Williams (Whitchurch HS)

== The Rhodri Morgan Memorial Award ('The Rhodri') ==
2018

City of Cardiff

2019

Whitchurch HS

== The Peter Corrigan Welsh Sports Media Award ==
This award was formerly called the WSHoF Welsh Sports Journalist of the Year.

1990 Peter Corrigan (Observer)	1998 David Facey (The Sun)	2006 Paul Abbandonato (Western Mail)	2015 Dot Davies (BBC Wales)
1991 Ken Jones (Independent)	1999 Geoff Nicholson (Independent)	2007 John Hopkins (The Times)	2016 Riath Al-Samarrai (Daily Mail)
1992 Bob Humphrys (BBC Wales)	2000 Brian Madley (The People)	2008 James Lawton (News of World)	2017 Mark Orders (Swansea Evening Post)
1993 Paul Rees (SW Echo)	2001 Michael Boon (Western Mail)	2009 Robin Davey (South Wales Argus)	2018 Stephen Bale (Sunday Times)
1994 Stephen Jones (Sunday Times)	2002 Eddie Butler (The Observer)	2010 Hamish Stuart & Steve Pope (Sporting Wales)	2019 David Davies (Press Association)
1995 Huw Llywelyn-Davies (BBC Wales)	2003 Graham Thomas (BBC Wales)	2012 Carolyn Hitt (Western Mail)	
1996 Peter Jackson (Daily Mail)	2004 Jamie Corrigan (Wales on Sunday)	2013 Rob Phillips (BBC Wales)	
1997 Ron Jones (BBC 5 Live)	2005 Gerald Davies (The Times)	2014 Chris Wathan (Media Wales)	
