= Real Estate Authority =

Entity in New Zealand responsible for the regulation of the real estate industry

- Te Mana Papawhenua

Agency overview
- Formed: September 16, 2008; 18 years ago
- Superseding agency: Real Estate Licensing Board
- Jurisdiction: New Zealand
- Headquarters: 95 Customhouse Quay, Wellington, New Zealand
- Employees: 48 (2019/20)
- Minister responsible: Paul Goldsmith, Minister of Justice
- Agency executives: Belinda Moffat, Chief Executive and Registrar; Denese Bates, Chairperson
- Website: Website

The Real Estate Authority (REA), formerly the Real Estate Agents Authority (REAA), is the New Zealand Crown entity responsible for the regulation of the New Zealand real estate industry as well as the agents within it.

The purpose of REA is to promote and protect the interests of consumers with respect to property transactions, and to promote confidence in real estate agency work. The organisation's strategic goal is to see empowered consumers working with trusted real estate professionals.

The agency was established in 2008 under the Real Estate Agents Act, 2008. It became functional on 17 November 2009. The Crown entity falls under the jurisdiction of the Ministry of Justice.

== History ==
The Real Estate Agents Authority (REAA), now the Real Estate Authority (REA) was established in 2009, after the enactment of the Real Estate Agents Act in 2008. The organisation took control of, and maintained, the roles of the now-defunct Real Estate Agents Licensing Board

In February 2018, the organisation's operating name was changed from Real Estate Agents Authority to the Real Estate Authority. Also in February 2018, the REA launched settled.govt.nz, an independent and comprehensive government website for property buyers and sellers.

In 2011, REAA increased the operating levy from $494 per annum to $690 per annum, excluding GST.

In the period of 2011-2012, REAA introduced a continuing education programme whereby all licensee's are required to complete 20 hours of education, of which 10 hours are prescribed by directly by REA. In 2012, 11 licensees had their licences cancelled on the basis of non-completion of the 20 hours of education. The continuing education programme was replaced with a continuing professional development (CPD) programme in 2019.

During 2012-2013, REAA found 124 complaints were consistent with unsatisfactory conduct, down from 152 in the 2011-2012 financial period, and a further 16 determinations of serious misconduct, up from 14 in the previous financial period.

In the aftermath of the 2016 Kaikōura earthquake, the REAA temporarily moved its headquarters from Level 2, 10 Brandon Street, Wellington to Level 3, 3 The Terrace, Wellington. According to the 2016-2017 Annual Report, the reasoning for the headquarters relocation was due to Deloitte House, its former headquarters, being deemed unsafe. In the days following the decision, REAA instructed its workers to work from home until a suitable building is found for the interim headquarters. An interim headquarters was located on 5 December 2017, the current headquarters at 3 The Terrace, Wellington. REA then relocated to more permanent premises at 95 Customhouse Quay, Wellington.

In June 2020, REA announced the appointment of Belinda Moffat as its new Chief Executive, replacing Kevin Lampen-Smith who left in May.

== Partners ==
According to the 2011-2012 Annual Report, REA, as a constituent department of the Ministry of Justice, undertakes its duties alongside, and with the help of, a multitude of Government Agencies. As a part of REA's monitoring and enforcing roles, they deal directly with the New Zealand Police, the Commerce Commission, the Serious Fraud Office, the Department of Internal Affairs, the Financial Markets Authority, and the Ministry of Business, Innovation and Employment (MBIE).

According to the 2012-2013 Annual report, other relationships include,

- In relation to guidance and policy, REA relies on information and the advice from, Real Estate Advisory Groups, the New Zealand Law Society, the Home Owners and Buyers Association of New Zealand, Consumer NZ, the New Zealand Citizens Advice Bureau, and Community Law New Zealand.
- In relation to helping with the licensing process, REA relies on the Police and MBIE to ensure only "fit and proper" people are licensed.
- In relation to ensuring licensees are compliant with New Zealand regulation and legislation of the real estate industry, REA maintains relationships with, the Real Estate Institute of New Zealand (REINZ), the Royal Institution of Chartered Surveyors, and Industry representatives.
- In relation to the detection and monitoring of licensees, REA maintains relationships with the MBIE, the Commerce Commission, the Financial Markets Authority, and Inland Revenue.
- In relation to taking action against those who do not comply with REA's rules and regulations, REA maintains relationships with, Complaints Assessment Committees, the Real Estate Agents Disciplinary Tribunal, the District and High Courts, and the Ministry of Justice.

== Roles and Powers ==
Primary Role
REA is tasked with promoting and protecting the interests of consumers within the real estate industry and is tasked with promoting public confidence in real estate agency work. REA is tasked with maintaining a publicly-accessible register of licensees.

REA is responsible for 15 primary objectives.

The responsibilities, according to the Real Estate Agents Act of 2008, of the Real Estate Authority are to,

- Administer the licensing regime for agents, branch managers, and salespeople, including the granting and renewal of licence applications.
- Appoint a Registrar of the register of licensees.
- Ensure that the register of licensees is established, kept, and maintained.
- Develop practice rules for the Minister's approval and maintain these rules for licensees, including ethical responsibilities.
- Set fees and levies.
- Appoint Complaints Assessment Committees and maintain a panel of persons suitable to serve as members of Complaints Assessment Committees.
- Develop consumer information on matters relating to real estate transactions, including approved guides on agency agreements and sale and purchase agreements.
- Develop and provide consumer information on matters relating to the provision of real estate services, including providing the public with information on how to make a complaint.
- Set professional standards for agents.
- Investigate and initiate proceedings in relation to offences under this Act and any other enactment.
- Investigate of its own motion any act, omission, allegation, practice, or other matter which indicates or appears to indicate unsatisfactory conduct or misconduct on the part of a licensee.
- Provide procedures for the lodging of complaints.
- Receive complaints relating to the conduct of licensees.
- Carry out any other function that the Minister may direct REA to perform in accordance with section 112 of the Crown Entities Act 2004.
- Carry out any other functions that may be conferred on REA by this Act or any other enactment.

Additional Role(s)

- REA is tasked with presenting its Annual Report to the House of Representatives, pursuant to the provisions of the Crown Entities Act of 2004.

=== Legislative Instruments ===
- Real Estate Agents (Audit) Regulations (2009)
- Real Estate Agents (Complaints and Discipline) Regulations (2009)
- Real Estate Agents (Duties of Licensees) Regulations (2009)
- Real Estate Agents (Licensing) Regulations (2009)
- Real Estate Agents (Exemptions) Regulations 2017
- Real Estate Agents (Professional Conduct and Client Care) Rules 2012
- Real Estate Agents (Continuing education Practice Rules) Notice 2011
- Real Estate Agents (Fees and Levies) Notice 2016

Details about the regulations can be found on the REA website.

Form Number	Section	Purpose of Form	Notes
1	38	Application by an individual for an agent's licence.	
2	38	Application by a company for an agent's licence.	
3	38	Application for a branch manager's licence.	
4	38	Application for a salesperson's licence.	
5	38	Declaration in support of an application by an individual for an agent's, branch manager's, or salesperson's licence.	
6	38	Declaration of support of an application by a company for an agents licence.	
7	52	Application for renewal of an agent's licence issued to an individual, a branch manager's licence, or a salesperson's licence.	
8	52	Application for renewal of an agent's licence issued to a company.	
9	62	Application for temporary licence to carry on business as an agent.	
10	43(2)	Evidence of issue or renewal of licence.	

=== Complaints Assessment Committee ===
A Complaints Assessment Committee is a three-member executive committee tasked with making impartial decisions based on complaints, referred to them by REA in regards to the behavior of licensees. The membership of the Committees are drawn from a panel maintained by REA. People are appointed to the panel based on their personal attributes and their knowledge and experience of matters likely to come before a Committee, including knowledge and experience of the real estate industry, the law and consumer affairs. Every Committee must include a lawyer of at least 7 years’ legal experience.

According to the 2010-2011 Annual Report, "The Authority must refer every complaint to a CAC and when directed by a CAC it must carry out further investigations. This includes all costs associated with investigations and any procedural costs.". The cost of managing the work of the CAC's, in the 2010-2011 period, amounted to $2,612,000.

== Finances ==
REA receives no funding from the New Zealand Government and relies on fees and levies collected from licensed real estate agents. The financial situation of REA has been described as stable in relation to the stability of the number of licensees.

The initial funding of REA consisted of capital funding and an interest free loan, to the values of $2,078,000 and $6,307,000 respectively, with a total value of $8,385,000. The loan, from the Crown, must be paid in full by 30 April 2016. In the period 2009-2010, REA made a $4,683,000 deficit; however, maintained $7,105,000 in cash on hand.

The net surplus of REA, for the financial period of 2010-2011, was $237,000; however, maintained $2,876,000 in cash and cash equivalents. REA's investments totaled $4,700,000 in term deposits.

The total revenue of REA, for the 2011-2012 financial period, was approximately $10,014,000; however, total comprehensive revenue was $1,015,000. Cash and Cash equivalents stood at $5,590,000.

The total revenue, for the 2012-2013 financial period, was $10,418,000; however, total comprehensive income totaled 15.75% of total revenue, at $1,418,000. Cash and cash equivalents stood at $6,376,000.

According to the Annual Report, of the 2013-2014 financial period, the Total Revenue of REA was $10,754,000, and the Comprehensive Income was $1,616,000. The asset base of REA stood at $10,443,000, with Cash and Cash equivalents at $2,111,000 and other investments accounting for $8,107,000.

In the financial period for 2016-2017, the Total Revenue of REA was $11,888,000 and the Comprehensive Revenue amounted to $1,439,000. In the same period, Cash and Cash equivalents amounted to $1,578,000, whilst Total Assets were valued at $10,232,000.

== Operating Statistics ==
- Renewal applications are applications made throughout the given financial period where an existing licensee has applied for a renewal of their license.
- New applications are license applications from an entity/person who does not already have a license.
- Voluntary Suspensions are licensees of whom have voluntarily suspended their licenses, ultimately ending their license.
- Complaints received are the number of complaints received within the given period.

Period	Renewal Applications	New Applications	Voluntary Suspensions	Complaints Received	Notes
2009-2010	15,030	1,827	1,333	456	
2010-2011	11,812	1,281	2,662	598	
2011-2012	12,628	1,111	3,584	749	
2012-2013	11,555	1,624	3,132	778	
2013-2014	11,983	1,901	3,203	685	
2014-2015	12,374	1,921	3,213	627	
2015-2016	12,970	2,204	3,999	564	
2016-2017	13,529	3,286	2,279	477	
Total	101,881	15,155	23,405	4,934	

== Management ==
=== Ministers Responsible ===
Colour key
(for political parties)

Labour National

No.	Name	Portrait	Term of Office		Prime Minister
1	Annette King		31 October 2007	19 November 2008	Clark
2	Simon Power		19 November 2008	12 December 2011	Key
3	Judith Collins		12 December 2011	30 August 2014	Key
4	Amy Adams		30 August 2014	25 October 2017	Key
4	Amy Adams		30 August 2014	25 October 2017	English
5	Andrew Little		26 October 2017	16 October 2020	Ardern
6	William Sio		17 October 2020	Incumbent	Ardern

=== Chief Executives ===
Executive	Appointment	End	Notes
Janet Mazenier	1 January 2009	30 June 2010	
Kieth Manch	4 November 2010	12 December 2011	
Kevin Lampen-Smith	12 December 2011	13 May 2020	
Belinda Moffat	8 September 2020	Incumbent	

=== Board of directors ===
All members of the Board of Directors are directly appointed by the Minister of Justice. The Board is responsible for the overall governance of the organisation. The composition of the Board consists of experts in the legal, real estate, risk management, finance, and consumer rights sectors.

The Board can have up to seven members, of which two must be either licensees or former licensees.

The current Board of Directors, according to the REA website, is:

- Denese Bates, QC - Chairperson
- Marion Eades
- Elizabeth Nidd
- Anthony Stack
- Latham Lockwood
- Vern Walsh, JP

== Notable cases ==
- On 3 March 2010, REAA, acting on the advice of an appointed CAC, censured North Shore-based Real Estate Agent Tip Spooner, then working for Milford's Prestige Real Estate International, for sending an elderly woman a business card and a valuation on her property not long after her husband's death. This act was deemed as a breach of REAA's Code of Professional Conduct and Client Care. This case was also the first censuring undertaken by REAA.
- On 27 April 2010, REAA, acting on the advice of an appointed CAC, found Auckland-based Real Estate Agent Lawrence Lalit Naidu, then working for Sega Realty, guilty of unsatisfactory conduct after charging a client over $5,000 more than what was previously agreed to. Due to the offence occurring prior to the enactment of the Real Estate Agents Act in 2008, the offence was punishable under the previous real estate governing act, the Real Estates Agents Act, 1976.
- On 20 August 2010, REAA ruled that North Shore-based Real Estate Agent Darryn Laskey, who was New Zealand's 4th best salesman at the time, was guilty of "unsatisfactory conduct in his response to emails he felt attacked him". The CAC appointed to determine the case found that some comments made by the agent amounted to personal abuse, and that verdict led to the guilty ruling.
