= Gaye Teede =

Australian netball player and coach

Personal information
- Full name: Gaye Teede (née: Switch)
- Born: 15 April 1946 (age 80) Midland, Western Australia

Netball career
- Playing positions: C, WA
| Years | National team | Caps |
| 1966–1979 | Australia | 17 |
Coaching career
- Years: Team
- 1986–1988: Australia U21
- 1990–1998: Australian Institute of Sport
- 1990: Australia
- 1999–2002: Perth Orioles
Medal record
Representing Australia
World Netball Tournament
| Silver medal – second place | 1967 Perth | Team |
| Gold medal – first place | 1971 Kingston | Team |
| Gold medal – first place | 1979 Port of Spain | Team |

Gaye Teede (born 15 April 1946), also known as Gaye Switch or Gaye Walsh, is a former Australia netball international and a former Australia head coach. As a player, she represented Australia at the 1967, 1971 and 1979 World Netball Tournaments, winning one silver and two gold medals. She captained Australia as they won the gold medal in 1971 and was subsequently named the Western Australian Sports Star of the Year. She was head coach when the Australia U21 team won the 1988 World Youth Netball Championships. In 1990, Teede coached the senior Australia team for five tests. Between 1990 and 1998 Teede served as head coach at the Australian Institute of Sport. In 1989 she was inducted into the Western Australian Hall of Champions and in 2009 she was inducted into the Australian Netball Hall of Fame.

== Playing career ==
=== Western Australia ===
In 1961, as Gaye Switch, Teede represented Western Australia at under-16 level. In 1963 she made her debut for the senior Western Australia team. In 1969, in Adelaide, she was a member the senior Western Australia team that won the Australian National Netball Championships outright for the first time.

=== Australia ===
Between 1966 and 1979, Teede made 17 test appearances for Australia. She represented Australia at the 1967 and 1971 World Netball Tournament, winning silver and gold respectively. She also captained Australia at the latter tournament and was subsequently named the Western Australian Sports Star of the Year. Teede then took a seven year break from international netball to start a family. On her return she represented Australia at the 1979 World Netball Tournament, serving as vice captain. The tournament saw Australia, New Zealand and Trinidad and Tobago declared joint winners. A serious knee injury at the 1979 tournament ended Teede's playing career.

| Tournaments | Place |
|---|---|
| 1967 World Netball Tournament | 2nd place, silver medalist(s) |
| 1971 World Netball Tournament | 1st place, gold medalist(s) |
| 1979 World Netball Tournament | 1st place, gold medalist(s) |

== Coaching career ==
=== Australian Institute of Sport ===
Between 1982 and 1990 Teede served as an assistant coach to Wilma Shakespear at the Australian Institute of Sport. In 1990 she replaced Shakespear as the program's head coach and remained in the position until 1998.

=== Australia ===
Between 1986 and 1988, Teede served as head coach of the Australia U21 team. She was head coach when Australia won the 1988 World Youth Netball Championships. In 1990, Teede coached the senior Australia team in five Tests with an 80% winning record.

=== Perth Orioles ===
Between 1999 and 2002, Teede served as head coach of Perth Orioles in the Commonwealth Bank Trophy.

== Honours ==
=== Player ===
Australia

- World Netball Tournament
  - Winners: 1971, 1979
  - Runners up: 1967

Western Australia

- Australian National Netball Championships
  - Winners: 1969

=== Individual ===
- Western Australian Sports Star of the Year
  - Winner: 1971
- Western Australian Hall of Champions
  - Winner: 1989
- Australian Netball Hall of Fame
  - Inducted: 2009

=== Head coach ===
Australia U21

- World Youth Netball Championships
  - Winners: 1988
