= Pam Marsden =

New Zealand netball player

Personal information
- Full name: née: Hamilton
- Born: 5 June 1941 (age 85)
- Height: 1.71 m (5 ft 7 in)

Netball career
- Playing positions: GD, WD
Years	National team	Caps
1967-69	New Zealand	8
Medal record
Representing New Zealand
World Netball Tournament
Gold medal – first place	1967 Perth	Tournament

Pam Marsden is a former New Zealand netball international. She was a member of the New Zealand team at the 1967 World Netball Tournament, when New Zealand won the tournament for the first time.

== Netball career ==
Marsden (née Hamilton) was born on 5 June 1941. She played basketball for Auckland before being selected for the Silver Ferns, the national netball team, to play in the 1967 World Netball Tournament. She played in the goal keeper (GK) and goal defence (GD) positions. Her first game for her country was against South Africa on 14 August 1967. New Zealand won the championships, beating Australia 40–34 in the deciding match. Marsden also played for the Silver Ferns in 1969, playing for her country for a total of eight occasions.

The 1967 World Netball Tournament team was inducted into the New Zealand Sports Hall of Fame in 1996.
