= Wendy White (netball) =

Welsh netball player, coach, umpire, administrator and author (1940-2016)

Wendy White BEM
Personal information
- Full name: Wendy Bartlett White
- Born: May 1940 Barry, Wales
- Died: 15 August 2016 (aged 76)
- School: Barry College

Netball career
- Playing position: WD
Years	National team	Caps
1963	Wales	7
Coaching career
- Years: Team
- 1968–1980: Wales

Wendy White BEM (May 1940–15 August 2016) is a former Welsh netball player, coach, umpire, administrator and author. As a player she represented Wales at the 1963 World Netball Tournament. Between 1968 and 1980, she served as Wales head coach, including at the 1971, 1975 and 1979 World Netball Tournaments. White subsequently served as an administrator with several netball governing bodies and clubs, most notably with Wales Netball, serving in various roles, including President. She was serving as President when she died in August 2016. In the 2013 New Year Honours list she was awarded the British Empire Medal for services to netball in Wales. In 2017, Wales Netball introduced the Wendy White Trophy Series in her honour. The series has seen Wales host various national teams including New Zealand, Samoa and South Africa. In 2019, White became the second netball player to be inducted into the Welsh Sports Hall of Fame.

== Early life, education and academic career ==
White was born in Barry, Vale of Glamorgan. She moved to Caldicot with her family at the age of 15, but she returned to the town of her birth to train as a teacher of Physical Education at Barry College. She later became a Senior Lecturer in Human Movement Studies at Cardiff Metropolitan University.

== Playing career ==
=== Wales ===
White represented Wales at the 1963 World Netball Tournament. She earned all seven of her international caps at this tournament. Playing at Wing Defence, she made her senior debut on 5 August 1963. During the tournament she played against Scotland, Australia, the West Indies, South Africa, Jamaica, New Zealand and Northern Ireland.

== Coaching career ==
=== Wales ===
Between 1968 and 1980, White served as Wales head coach, including at the 1971, 1975 and 1979 World Netball Tournaments. As well as coaching the senior national team, she also coached the under-21 team (1969–1971, 1980–1987) and the schoolgirls team (1969–1971). Even after stepping down as a coach she continued to serve as a selector for various Wales teams. White was head coach when Wales achieved some respectable results against England. In 1977 they drew 41–41 and in 1978 they drew 24–24. In 1980, Wales defeated England 33–29 in Plymouth. This was the first time Wales had defeated England.

== Administrator ==
Between 1987 and 1991, White worked for the All Australia Netball Association and the Queensland Netball Association. On her return home in 1991, she became the first Technical Director for Wales Netball. In this role, she developed the first coaching and umpiring awards schemes for Wales. She subsequently served Wales Netball in various roles including President, Vice-President, Honorary Chair, General Secretary, Umpiring Secretary and Coaching Secretary. In 2000, when Wales hosted the World Youth Netball Championships, she was an influential member of the organising committee. Between 1997 and 1999, she served as an Executive Committee member of the International Federation of Netball Associations. She represented Wales at the members council in 1983 and at congress in 2003, 2009 and 2011 and was also involved with the Federation of European Netball Associations. She also served as a member of the Sports Council for Wales. She was serving as President of Wales Netball when she died in August 2016. White was also noted for her efforts to preserve the history of the Wales national netball team. She meticulously maintained index cards for the majority of players, effectively establishing a database of senior and youth players. As well as serving as an administrator at national and international level, she was involved on a more local level. She was Honorary Secretary for the Glamorgan and South Wales Netball Associations. She was also a founder member, Secretary and Coach of the Barrians Netball Club, Chair of the Dinas Netball Club and President of the Cardiff & District Netball Association. In the 2013 New Year Honours list, White was awarded the British Empire Medal for services to netball in Wales.

== Umpire and author ==
White also served an international umpire and published two education books on umpiring. She co-wrote Netball Umpires in Control (1992) with Shirley Winton. She also published Play by the Rules (1994).

== Legacy ==
=== Wendy White Trophy Series ===
In February 2017, Wales Netball introduced the Wendy White Trophy Series in her honour. The inaugural series saw Wales host New Zealand. Since then the series has featured Samoa and South Africa. In 2022, the series saw Wales host Gibraltar, the Isle of Man and the Republic of Ireland.

=== Welsh Sports Hall of Fame ===
In June 2019, White was posthumously inducted into the Welsh Sports Hall of Fame. She was the second netball player to be inducted.

== Honours ==
Individual Awards

Year	Award
2009	Europe Netball Service Award
2013	British Empire Medal
2019	Welsh Sports Hall of Fame
