= Elizabeth Rowley (netball) =

New Zealand netball player

Personal information
- Full name: Elizabeth Olive Rowley
- Born: 6 May 1949 (age 77)
- Height: 1.75 m (5 ft 9 in)

Netball career
- Playing positions: C, WA, WD
Years	National team	Caps
1967–1969	New Zealand	1
Medal record
Representing New Zealand
World Netball Tournament
Gold medal – first place	1967 Perth	Tournament

Elizabeth Olive Rowley (born 6 May 1949) is a former New Zealand netball international. She was a member of the New Zealand team at the 1967 World Netball Tournament, when New Zealand won the tournament for the first time.

== Early life ==
Rowley was born on 6 May 1949, the daughter of Helen Fay Rowley (née Scott) and Rewi Thomas Graham Rowley who farmed in the Clifden area of Southland.

== Netball career ==
Rowley first played representative netball for Southland when she was 16 years old.

After the 1966 national championships, Rowley was one of 21 players named as trialists for the national team to travel to the 1967 World Netball Tournament. She was duly selected after the trials held in March 1967, and was the youngest member of the squad. At the tournament, Rowley only played in one match, in the mid-court against Singapore.

The 1967 world championship team was inducted into the New Zealand Sports Hall of Fame in 1996.

Rowley moved to Christchurch in 1967 to study to become a dental nurse, and played for the Hagley club. The following year, she was selected to be a Canterbury representative player. Rowley graduated from the School for Dental Nurses in February 1969, and she returned to Southland.

In June 1969, Rowley was a surprise selection in the national squad chosen to play two tests against the touring Australian team. She had initially been omitted from the trials, but was included as she had been a member of the 1967 team to Australia, although her play on that tour was described as being "extremely disappointing". Subsequently, she did not appear in either of the two tests.

== Later life ==
In 1971, Rowley married Timothy Colin Story, who farmed Venlaw Station, east of Edendale, in partnership with his brother. She later lived in Coromandel, and Queenstown. She participated in the 1988 Golden Oldies World Netball Festival in Brisbane, playing in a team alongside Robyn Broughton and Elva Simpson.
