= Millie Munro =

New Zealand netball player

Personal information
- Full name: Marilyn Margaret (Millie) Munro
- Born: 4 September 1951 (age 75) Wellington, New Zealand
- Height: 1.79 m (5 ft 10 in)
- School: Wellington High School

Netball career
- Playing positions: GK, WD
Years	Club team	Apps
1971–1985	Wellington	
Years	National team	Caps
1974–1982	New Zealand	41
Medal record
Representing New Zealand
World Netball Tournament
Bronze medal – third place	1975 Auckland	Tournament
Gold medal – first place	1979 Port of Spain	Tournament

Millie Munro (born 1951) is a former netball player for the Silver Ferns, the New Zealand national netball team, who played for her country on 41 occasions, including at the 1975 and 1979 world championships.

== Early life ==
Marilyn Margaret (Millie) Munro was born on 4 September 1951. Learning sewing from her mother, and making her own clothes, she then studied design at the Wellington High School. She began her working life as a machinist at a clothing factory, playing netball in her spare time. In 1980, together with a friend, she set up a garment-producing company, originally working from home before moving into premises in Wellington and working with New Zealand designers.

== Netball career ==
Munro played netball at school and with the Wellington High School Old Girls team. She was selected for the Wellington Under-20 team in 1969 and 1970 and played in the Wellington senior side from 1971 to 1985. She was first selected for the national team in 1974, making her debut against Singapore in October of that year and forming a defensive pairing with Yvonne Willering. After touring to England she became part of the New Zealand team competing in the 1975 World Netball Tournament, which were held in Auckland, New Zealand. The team finished third. She played for the Silver Ferns in the 1979 World Netball Tournament. At that time there were no finals and the top ten teams played a Round-robin tournament that resulted in New Zealand, Australia and the hosts sharing the gold medal. The game against Trinidad and Tobago was controversial as Willering knocked over the local star Jean Pierre and the spectators became very aggressive. After the championships, Munro continued to play for the Silver Ferns until 1982.
