= Rangi Royal =

New Zealand soldier, sportsman and Māori welfare administrator (1896–1965)

Rangi Royal OBE MC
- Royal, c. 1956
- Born: Te Rangiātaahua Kiniwē Royal; 23 August 1896; Muhunoa, near Ōhau, New Zealand
- Died: 8 July 1965 (aged 68); Rotorua, New Zealand
- Resting place: Muruika Soldiers' Cemetery, Ōhinemutu
- Spouse: Te Puhi-o-Rākaiora Taiaroa
- Children: 5
- Military career
- Allegiance: New Zealand
- Branch: New Zealand Military Forces
- Service years: 1917–1919; 1939–1944
- Rank: Major
- Commands: B Company, 28th (Māori) Battalion
- Conflicts: World War I World War II: Battle of Greece; Battle of Crete; Libyan campaign
- Awards: Officer of the Order of the British Empire; Military Cross and Bar
- Other work: Controller of Māori Welfare (1946–1956)

Te Rangiātaahua Kiniwē Royal OBE MC (23 August 1896 – 8 July 1965), commonly known as Rangi Royal, was a New Zealand soldier, sportsman, land officer and Māori welfare administrator. He served with the New Zealand (Māori) Pioneer Battalion in the First World War and commanded B Company of the 28th (Māori) Battalion in the Second World War, receiving the Military Cross for his leadership on Crete and a bar to it in Libya. As the first controller of Māori welfare after the war, he set up the welfare division of the Department of Māori Affairs and did much of the groundwork for the founding of the Māori Women's Welfare League.

== Early life ==
Royal was born on 23 August 1896 at Muhunoa, near Ōhau in Horowhenua, the seventh of ten children of Te Kiniwē Roera Te Ahukaramū and Kēriata Hūnia Te Weu Tukukino. He was named after Te Rangiātaahua, an ancestor of his Ngāti Raukawa hapū, Ngāti Kikopiri, and through his great-grandfather Tukukino Te Ahiatāewa he also identified with Ngāti Tamaterā of Hauraki. He attended Ōtaki School, where he met his future wife, and then moved to Hauraki, attending Thames and Paeroa high schools. In 1912 he became the country's first Māori scoutmaster.

A strong sportsman, he represented Auckland at rugby as a five-eighth before the First World War. In 1916 he joined the Native Department at Rotorua.

== First World War ==
Royal enlisted in 1917 and embarked with the 25th Reinforcements of the Māori Reinforcements, serving with the New Zealand (Māori) Pioneer Battalion in France. He rose through the non-commissioned ranks to company sergeant major in December 1917 and was later commissioned, being discharged in May 1919 with the rank of lieutenant. After the armistice he played rugby for the Pioneer Battalion team in France and England.

== Between the wars ==
After his discharge Royal returned to the Native Department in Rotorua, where he worked as an interpreter and clerk to the Native Land Court and Māori Land Board, as a consolidation officer and as a farm supervisor, and took a leading part in the Māori land development scheme initiated by Āpirana Ngata. During the 1920s he took over responsibility for his family's land interests at Muhunoa and Kōmata from his uncle, Kerehi Roera Te Ahukaramū. He also worked with Ngata on organising the large tribal gatherings held at Rotorua.

He continued to play rugby, representing Rotorua and Bay of Plenty for several years, and was selected for the All Blacks in 1922 but was unable to play because of injury.

== Second World War ==
At the outbreak of the Second World War, Royal re-enlisted and was commissioned as a captain after completing an officers' course in November 1939. He was appointed to command B Company of the newly formed 28th (Māori) Battalion and was heavily involved in recruiting for the battalion. With Sergeant Major Frank Rennie, a Pākehā soldier who did not speak Māori, he helped establish discipline and organise training.

The battalion spent the second half of 1940 in England. A letter from Royal describing B Company's first Christmas overseas, with a hāngī and food sent from home, was published in the Bay of Plenty Beacon in March 1941.

Royal served with the battalion in Greece and on Crete. He was awarded the Military Cross for leading a bayonet charge against German troops near Suda Bay in May 1941, during the action at 42nd Street. Leading two companies of the battalion, he overran the advance of the I Battalion, 141st Gebirgsjäger Regiment, allowing the 5th New Zealand Brigade to withdraw. He then led a withdrawal of 24 miles (39 km), losing only two men killed and eight wounded.

During the first Libyan campaign in late 1941, Royal led his men in a night attack on Point 181 at Gazala. He was then given charge of organising the position against a counter-attack and was wounded the following day while holding its most forward post, spending some weeks in hospital. He received a bar to his Military Cross for this action. In 1942 he returned to New Zealand at the request of Āpirana Ngata to train reinforcements, including soldiers for a second Māori battalion that was never formed. He was discharged in 1944 with the rank of major and returned to the staff of the Department of Māori Affairs in Rotorua.

== Māori welfare ==
Royal was appointed chief welfare officer in 1944 and, in 1946, the first controller of Māori welfare, based in Wellington. In that role he was responsible for implementing the Maori Social and Economic Advancement Act 1945 and for laying the foundations of the welfare division of the Department of Māori Affairs. He was involved in many Māori development initiatives and laid much of the organisational groundwork for the establishment of the Māori Women's Welfare League in 1951, which began its work under the leadership of Whina Cooper with the support of Royal and his welfare staff.

In October 1953 he addressed nineteen meetings of Māori veterans of the First World War at which proposals for the Māori Soldiers' Fund and its scholarship scheme were discussed and approved. In 1955 he spent three months touring marae around the country to speak on the problem of excessive drinking. He retired from the public service in 1956 and moved to Rotorua.

== Other interests ==
Royal organised the first Māori cricket team to play in first-class matches and represented Rotorua and South Auckland at cricket; he also represented the district at rowing. He served on the Māori Advisory Board of the New Zealand Rugby Union and on the national executives of hockey, tennis and golf, and organised the Māori Lawn Tennis Association.

He had a strong interest in Māori tribal history, songs and genealogy, and was known as a leader of haka. He contributed material to Ngata's Ngā Mōteatea collection of songs and sat on the committee that revised the fifth edition of Williams's Dictionary of the Maori Language in the 1950s.

== Honours ==
Royal was awarded the Queen Elizabeth II Coronation Medal in 1953. In the 1964 New Year Honours, he was appointed an Officer of the Order of the British Empire for services to the Māori people.

== Personal life ==
In 1922 Royal married Irihapeti (Elizabeth) Te Puhi-o-Rākaiora Taiaroa, known as Puhi, a daughter of Hōri Kerei Taiaroa and Makereti Parata of Ngāi Tahu. They had three daughters and two sons; both sons served overseas during the Second World War, one in the air force and the other in the last reinforcement to the Māori Battalion.

Royal died suddenly at his home in Rotorua on 8 July 1965, aged 68, and was buried at Muruika Soldiers' Cemetery, Ōhinemutu.
