= Judy Blair =

American musician, singer, and composer

- Born: December 29, 1948 (age 77); East Texas, United States
- Genres: blues, rhythm & blues, jazz, boogie
- Occupations: Musician, songwriter
- Instruments: Vocals, piano, organ
- Years active: 1966–present

Judy Blair (born December 29, 1948) is an American musician, singer, piano and Hammond B3 organ player, a composer of jazz, blues, rhythm & blues and boogie music. She is a Hammond organ virtuoso whose musical career began in the United States in the 1960s and continues in France where she has lived since 1994. She has recorded four solo albums.

== Biography ==
=== Beginning ===
Judy Blair was born in East Texas to a family of Scottish Irish and Native American origins.

She learned to play piano by ear at a very early age and was already playing piano at the Baptist Church alongside her cousin by the time she was 6 years old.

At the age of 8 or 9, she began lessons with Mrs Louise Powell (who also played by ear and helped her to develop this ability as well as teaching her to read music).

When she was 11, she joined her first band, a group of young (13 years old) local jazz musicians, and together they won first prize at "The Battle of the Bands", a competition held in Shreveport, Louisiana.

Judy Blair began playing organ after becoming completely passionate after playing her cousin's Hammond. At that time, she was mostly listening to Blues and Rhythm & Blues artists (Aretha Franklin, Ray Charles, Otis Redding, Sam Cooke, Marvin Gaye to name a few) while hearing a lot of jazz at home because her father loved Louis Armstrong and jazz from the 1940s.

She began playing in nightclubs at the age of 16 (her parents chaperoned) and worked with a band, "Larry Stanley and The One Eyed Jacks."

=== American period ===
At the age of 17, Judy began doing some recording sessions at Robin Hood Brian's recording studio in Tyler, Texas, playing the Hammond B3.

There she recorded a single called "Old Laces" with the group The Glory Rhodes. Paul Varisco, a musician who had come to Brian's studio and attended this session, offered her a job in his band called Paul Varisco & The Milestones, a 9-piece R&B band from New Orleans including the late drummer "Big" Johnny Thomassie.

She left Texas in 1967 at age of 18 to join them.

In 1969, Judy and Johnny left the Milestones to join another R&B "pop" recording group called "Eternity's Children", who had a record on the charts named "Mrs. Bluebird".

This band had several "incarnations" and Judy replaced Mike MacClain who was called up to do his military service.

She stayed with the group 9 months before returning to Texas with Dino Vera, a drummer who she met in New Orleans during this time. They formed a band together called "Love Era" which toured Texas, California, New Mexico and Colorado with different formations (mostly 4-piece groups where Judy was played Hammond B3) from 1970 to 1984.

Judy Blair went to the Caribbean (St. Martin / St. Maarten) in 1986 where she stayed a couple of years working with a band called "Tropix".

She then returned to the States where she continued to make her living playing jazz, blues and R&B 6 nights a week in clubs. Her influences were Jimmy Smith, Jimmy McGriff, Richard "Groove" Holmes, Oscar Peterson without forgetting Ray Charles. She lived in Dallas, Los Angeles, and Carmel, California, Santa Fe, New Mexico among other places, living the life of a nomad, as it was easy at that time to have a "sit down" music gig and stay in a place for a month or two or longer.

=== French period ===
In 1994, Judy Blair moved to Southwest France, settling in the Quercy region near the city of Cahors in the Lot. As she was spending more time focusing on writing and composing music, she recorded and published 4 albums which all include some of her original material.

- In 1997, she recorded and produced an album in France called Les Couleurs du Noir et Blanc on which she plays solo piano and sings ballads and American Standards.
- In 1999, she recorded The Other Place in Dallas (Texas) in collaboration with her brother, Donny Blair (guitarist), Bruce Tate (bass) and Dino Vera (drums). Judy plays piano and Hammond B3 organ. This album also contains original compositions by Donny Blair.
- In 2000, she recorded Close Encounter in collaboration with Alvin Queen (drums) in New-York on which she sings and plays Hammond B3 and piano. This album also includes her brother Donny Blair (guitar), Houston Person (tenor saxophone), and Reggie Johnson (bass).
- In 2005, Judy returned to Dallas, Texas to record her 4th album, Sunshine on which she sings and plays piano and Hammond B3 along with her brother Donny Blair (guitar), Abdu Salim (tenor saxophone), Christian " Ton Ton " Salut (drums) and guest artist Lucky Peterson (vocals, piano, Hammond B3 on 2 of the songs). All the songs on this album were written by Judy and one was co-written by Lucky Peterson.

Blair performs at numerous concerts as a solo artist as well as with different musical formations, especially in France (3 times at Jazz in Marciac in 1995, 1998 and 2006, twice at Cahors Blues Festival in 1996 and 2009, in Aiguillon, Montauban, Mirepoix, Le Touquet, Villeneuve-sur-Lot Jazz & Blues Festival, Rion International Piano Festival, Monsegur 24 Hour Swing, Enghien les Bains, Toulouse, Souillac, Vaison la Romaine) as well as in other countries.

In Spain at the Autumn Jazz Festival in Castilla with Alvin Queen (drums) and Reggie Johnson (bass), also in Leon, Valladolid, Reus, Palencia. In Tunisia at Tabarka Jazz Festival in 2006 (with Abdu Salim on sax and Christian Salut on drums). In Sicily in 2007 (Catania and Syracuse) with Sarah Morrow (trombone) and Julie Saurey (drums). She was in a travel film for Japanese TV with Dino Vera (drums).

Blair helps organize charity concerts near and dear to her heart such as: SOS Katrina in 2005 in Cahors and SOS Haïti in February 2010 where she invited her friend Gary Brooker, singer, keyboard player and founder / leader of the group Procol Harum. She was invited by Gary to play in Woking, England alongside himself, Eric Clapton & band which included Andy Fairweather Low and Dave Bronze in 2009 & 2011 (New Year's Eve).

Blair and Brooker played two concerts, August 2010 and 2011 at Abbaye Nouvelle in S.W. France (Lot).

She played two evenings of Blues & Rock as a member of the band "Gary Brooker and Friends" Gary (vocals, keyboard), Andy Fairweather Low (guitar and vocals), Dave Bronze (bass) and Paul Beavis (drums) at Le Vigan in August 2013.

She played in duo (vocals, piano) with the late Serge Oustiakine (bass) at Albas Jazz in the Lot earlier in 2013 (June). On Valentine's Day (February 14, 2014) she played a solo concert in Lherm (in the Lot).

On May 7, 2014, she teamed up with François Bréant (composer, keyboard player, vocalist & producer) to play for charity again for the Rotary Club of Cahors. This concert was dedicated to music from the sixties and all benefits went to medical research for children's kidney disease.

== Personal life ==
She is the sister of jazz guitarist Donny Blair.

Blair is married to Jack Lestrade, a French American watercolor artist

== Discography ==
- Les Couleurs du Noir et Blanc (1997)
- The Other Place (1999)
- Close Encounter (2000)
- Sunshine (2005)
