= Terese Delaney =

Australian basketball and netball player

Terese Delany
No. 8 – Opals
- League: NSW Basketball League

Career highlights
- NSW Hall of Champions (for Netball) (1979)

Terese Delany (m. Kennedy) is a retired Australian women's basketball and netball player.

== Biography ==
Delany played for the Australia women's national basketball team at the 1967 FIBA World Championship for Women, hosted by Czechoslovakia. Delaney retired from representative basketball in 1968. She then turned her attention to netball and was named vice-captain of Australia’s triumphant team at the 1971 World Netball Championships. In 1979, Delany became the first netballer to be inducted into the NSW Hall of Champions.
