= Christine Pietzner =

New Zealand netball player

Personal information
- Full name: (Née: Cottrell)
- Born: 16 November 1949 (age 76)
- Height: 1.64 m (5 ft 5 in)

Netball career
- Playing positions: C, WA, WD
Years	National team	Caps
1974-79	New Zealand	21
Medal record
Representing New Zealand
World Netball Tournament
Bronze medal – third place	1975 Auckland	Tournament
Gold medal – first place	1979 Trinidad	Tournament

Christine Pietzner was a New Zealand netball player who played for her country on 21 occasions.

== Netball career ==
Christine Pietzner (née Cottrell) was born on 16 November 1949. Her brother was Wayne Cottrell, a rugby union player who played for the All Blacks. Her son, Jason, also became a rugby union player, playing over 300 times for the team in Lincoln, New Zealand.

Pietzner played netball for the Canterbury region. She was selected to play for the Silver Ferns, the New Zealand national netball team, in 1974 and made her debut on 15 October 1974 against Singapore, en route to a tour of England, where New Zealand were unbeaten. She was selected for the Silver Ferns team to take part in the 1975 World Netball Tournament with New Zealand finishing in third place. She was also in the team for the 1979 World Netball Tournament. In her career, Pietzner played in the Wing attack (WA), Wing defence (WD) and Centre (C) positions.
