= Joan Harnett =

New Zealand netball player and real estate agent (born 1943)

Joan Harnett ONZM
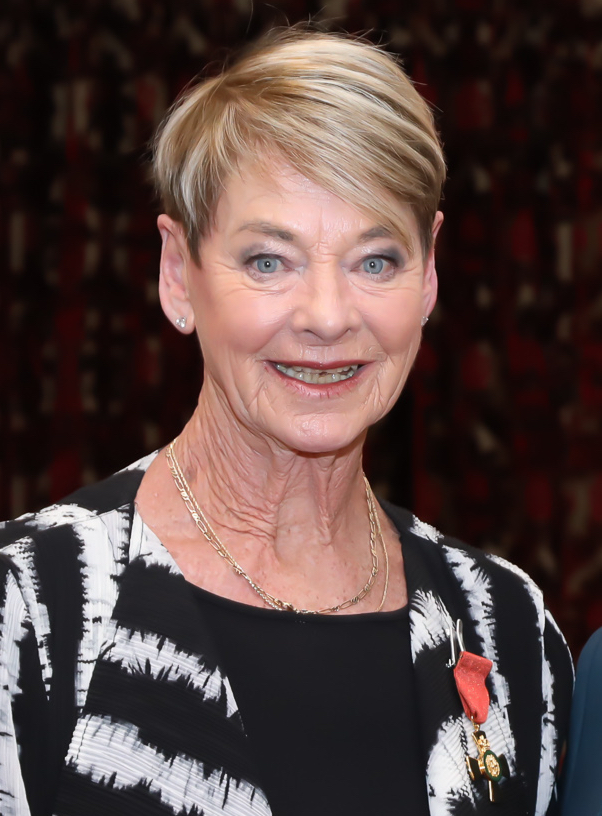

Personal information
- Full name: Joan Frances Harnett-Kindley (Née: Martin)
- Born: 24 February 1943 (age 83) New Zealand
- Occupations: Bank worker; Real estate agent
- Children: 1

Netball career
- Playing positions: GA, GS, WA
Years	Club team	Apps
1960–1974	Canterbury	
Years	National team	Caps
1963–1971	New Zealand	116
Medal record
Representing New Zealand
World Netball Tournament
Gold medal – first place	1967 Perth	Tournament
Silver medal – second place	1963 Eastbourne	Tournament
Silver medal – second place	1971 Kingston	Tournament

Joan Frances Harnett-Kindley ONZM (née Martin; born 24 February 1943) is a former New Zealand netball international. She began playing for Canterbury's Sacred Hart team in 1960 and was first selected to play for the New Zealand national netball team in 1963. Harnett played in the 1963, 1967 and 1971 World Netball Tournaments and was named player of the tournament of the 1967 competition that New Zealand won. She stopped playing internationally in 1971 and retired three years later. Harnett played in 116 international matches and was captain for 45 of them. took up a career in the real estate industry from 1972 to about 2007, serving as a member of various committees and was an inaugural member of the Real Estate Authority. Harnett is an inductee of the New Zealand Sports Hall of Fame and was named a Sporting Legend of Canterbury in 2007.

== Early life and career ==
Harnett was born on 24 February 1943. Growing up in New Zealand, Harnett spent some of her childhood in Dunedin. She also lived in Blenheim and Christchurch during her youth. Her mother was a hockey player for Southland and also played basketball. Harnett played basketball until she was 12 years old. Other sports that Harnett played in school included tennis and netball. Upon finishing school, she began playing netball for the Sacred Hart team (now known as Hearts) in Canterbury in 1960 and was selected for the 1963 New Zealand national netball team trials. Harnett was part of the New Zealand squad that contested the 1963 World Netball Tournament in England, where the team finished runners-up to Australia by a single goal. For the 1967 World Netball Tournament, she and the rest of the New Zealand team trained for ten days in Christchurch. At the time, Harnett was working in a bank and practised shooting at break times. She recalls taking unpaid leave to frequently do fundraising for the squad. New Zealand went on to win the competition and Harnett's performance throughout meant she was voted player of the tournament.

She was named captain of the New Zealand side for the 1971 World Netball Tournament. The team went on to finish runners-up behind Australia for the second time. Harnett stopped playing for the national team in 1971, and retired outright in 1974. She said she retired because she did not want to fail and had "always been an achiever. I've always liked to succeed." She had played for the New Zealand national team 26 times in World Championship competition and earned 116 caps overall; a total of 45 caps were when Harnett was captain. Harnett went on to coach the Canterbury team for two years after the regular coach Cath Brown became unwell, finishing first and second in the provincial tournament. She wrote a column for the national newspaper Truth as she was coaching; Harnett enjoyed writing a column because she liked voicing her views on issues important to her. In 1996, she declined an offer to coach the Dunedin University side that had been demoted from the A to the B grade because she no longer wanted to coach.

In 1972, Harnett began a career in the real estate industry and at first assigned appointments around her netball matches. She went on to establish Joan Harnett Real Estate fifteen years later. In 1995, Harnett left the business and moved to Dunedin. She was the first female to be awarded both the Fellowship and Life Membership to the Real Estate Institute of New Zealand in 2003. She was a member of the Canterbury-Westland District Real Estate Executive Committee, the Canterbury-Westland and Otago District Committee presidents and was an inaugural member of the Real Estate Authority. Harnett was a judge to determine the Master Builders House of the Year and is a patron of the New Zealand Masters Games. She is a member of the Board of Governors of the New Zealand Sports Hall of Fame. By 2007, Harnett had left the real estate industry.

== Personal life ==
She was married for seven years to sportsperson Joe Harnett and had a son with him. She remarried in 1995 to former boxer and tennis player Don Kindley.

== Profile ==
Harnett played variously in the wing attack, goal attack and goal shooter positions. During her netball career, she received press attention for her photogenic appearance, and had less focus on her achievements. The media variously described her as "a long legged beauty", "the male's ideal sportswomen" and "the essence of femininity". Harnett is, however, credited with changing the perception of netball in New Zealand, during a time when women's sport received little coverage from the nation's media. According to Bridget Tunnicliffe of Radio New Zealand, Harnett "redefined the scope and skill of the shooting positions, with her ability to read the game and instinctive play".

== Honours and awards ==
Harnett has been twice inducted into the New Zealand Sports Hall of Fame: first in 1990 as an individual; and then in 1996 as a member of the New Zealand netball team that won the 1967 world championship. A panel of experts named Harnett the goal attack in their "Dream Team" as part of the 75th Anniversary of Netball New Zealand in 1999, and was voted New Zealand's Netball Player of the Century in June 2000. She was one of two first sportspeople to be named to the Sporting Legends of Canterbury at the Sport Canterbury Winter Awards in late 2007.

In the 2020 Queen's Birthday Honours, Harnett was appointed an Officer of the New Zealand Order of Merit, for services to netball and the real estate industry.

In 2024, Harnett was an inaugural inductee to the Netball New Zealand Hall of Fame.
