= Wales Netball =

Governing body for netball in Wales

- Pêl-rwyd Cymru
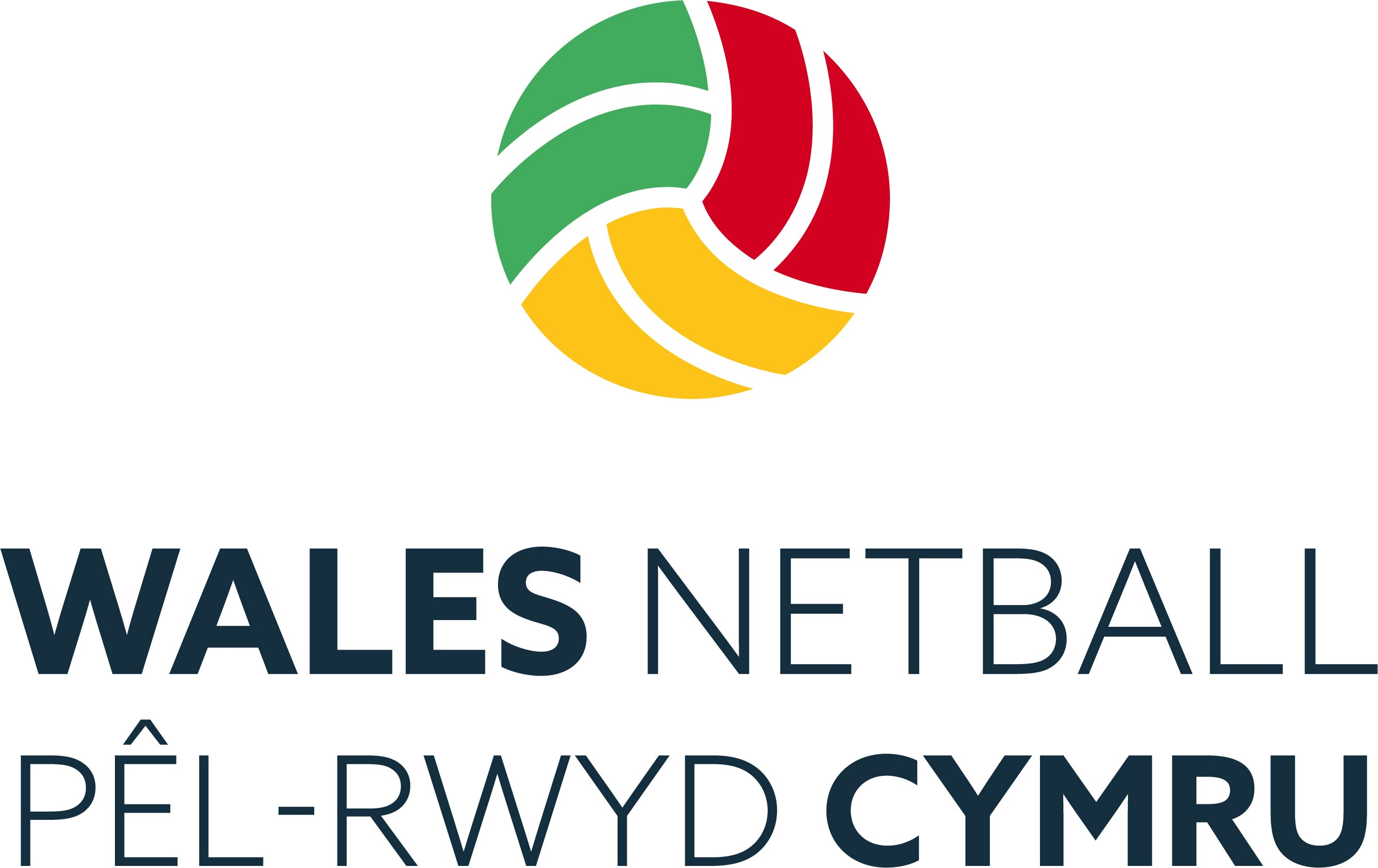
- Sport: Netball
- Jurisdiction: Wales
- Founded: 1945
- Affiliation: World Netball
- Regional affiliation: Europe Netball
- Headquarters: Sport Wales National Centre
- Location: Sophia Gardens; Cardiff
- Chairperson: Catherine Hares
- CEO: Sarah Boswell

Official website
- www.walesnetball.com

Wales Netball (Welsh: Pêl-rwyd Cymru) is the main governing body for netball in Wales. It was originally founded in 1945 as the Welsh Netball Association (Welsh: Cymdeithas Pêl-rwyd Cymru). In 2021, it adopted its current name. It is affiliated to both World Netball and Europe Netball. Wales Netball were founding members of both these governing bodies. It is responsible for organising and administering the Wales national netball team and the Netball Super League team, Cardiff Dragons, as well as local leagues and other competitions. Since 2009, its headquarters have been based at the Sport Wales National Centre.

== History ==
Season	Key events
1943 to 1945	The exact date when the Welsh Netball Association was founded is not known. Sometime between 1943 and 1945, a group PE teachers, including Marion Morton of the Mary Datchelor School, which was evacuated to Llanelli for the duration of World War II, and Beatrice Williams from Carmarthenshire, formed a small committee to organise netball matches. This committee later became the Wales Netball Association. Morton became the first Honorary Secretary and Beatrice Williams and became the first Chair
1945	In 1981, in the absence of the early records, the executive committee of the WNA agreed to recognise 1945 as the association's year of foundation.
May 1949	The Wales national netball team made their Test debut on 7 May 1949 with a 14–13 win against Scotland. The match was played at the General Electric Company ground on Preston Road, Wembley during the 1949 England Scotland Wales Netball Series. Wales also played England for the first time on the same day, losing 25–3.
1960	The WNA was one of the eight founder members of the International Federation of Women's Netball and Basketball Associations, now known as World Netball
1989	The WNA was a founder member of the Federation of European Netball Associations, now known as Europe Netball
1992	The WNA became a limited company and forms its first board of directors.
2005	Celtic Dragons, later to become Cardiff Dragons, become founder members of the new Netball Super League.
2009	The WNA offices moved to the Sport Wales National Centre. They were previously based at Cathedral Road, Cardiff.
August 2021	The WNA changes its name to Wales Netball
September 2025	In 2025, Wales Netball introduced a new long-term strategic plan titled Ymladd 2030, designed to guide the organisation’s development over the decade. The plan follows a period of organisational challenge and sets out priorities including high-performance development, restructuring of operational functions, and strengthening athlete, coach and official pathways.

== Board members ==
=== Presidents ===
Years	
1940s	Annie Rogers
20xx–2016	Wendy White
2017–2021	Merle Hamilton
2021–2025	Sheila Cooksley

=== Chairs ===
Years	
1940s	Beatrice Williams
2010–2024	Catherine Lewis
2024–	Catherine Hares

== CEOs ==
Years	
20xx–2014	Mike Fatkin
2014	Mike Watson
2015	Alun Davies
2015–2021	Sarah Jones
2021–2024	Vicki Sutton
2025–	Sarah Boswell
