= Netball in Papua New Guinea =

Overview of the ball sport in Papua New Guinea

- Country: Papua New Guinea
- Governing body: Papua New Guinea Netball Federation
- National team: Papua New Guinea
- Registered players: 10,000

Papua New Guinea Netball Federation was created in the 1960s. There are over 10,000 registered netball players in the country. A large support base for the sport exists around Port Moresby.

England's record against Papua New Guinea in international matched between 1949 and 1976 was one win and zero losses. England beat Papua New Guinea 114–16 at the World Tournament in 1975.

At Gay Games VI, a transgender netball from Papua New Guinea competed.

Some of the top performances for the Papua New Guinea national netball team include:

- 2008 Nations Cup: First

As of January 2011, the women's national team was ranked number seventeen in the world.

== Bibliography ==
- All England Netball Association (1976). Golden jubilee : 1926 - 1976. All England Netball Association. OCLC 39500756.
- Lal, Brij Vilash; Fortune, Kate (2000). The Pacific islands : an encyclopedia. University of Hawai'i press. ISBN 0-8248-2265-X. OCLC 468583962.
- International Federation of Netball Associations (21 January 2011a). "Current World Rankings". Archived from the original on 19 May 2011.
- Netball Papua New Guinea. "Netball PNG Profile". Archived from the original on 25 September 2017.
- Netball Papua New Guinea (2008). "2008 Nations Cup".
- Symons, Carol; Hemphill, Dennis (November 2006). "Netball and transgender participation". In Caudwell, Jayne (ed.). Sport, sexualities and queer/theory. Routledge Critical Studies in Sport. Routledge. pp. 122–124. ISBN 0-415-36761-1.
