= Frances Granger =

New Zealand netball player and coach (1945–2026)

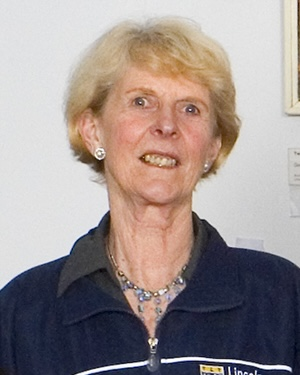
- Granger in 2010

Personal information
- Full name: Frances Granger (née Rawstorn)
- Born: 17 December 1945
- Died: 29 April 2026 (aged 80) Rangiora, New Zealand
- Height: 1.75 m (5 ft 9 in)

Netball career
- Playing positions: GS, GA
Years	National team	Caps
1974–1975	New Zealand	12
Medal record
Representing New Zealand
World Netball Tournament
Bronze medal – third place	1975 Auckland	Tournament

Frances Granger (née Rawstorn; 17 December 1945 – 29 April 2026) was a New Zealand netball player and coach. She played 12 times for her country in the goal attack and goal shooter positions, and went on to coach the game in places as diverse as Botswana, Fiji and Wales, as well as in New Zealand.

== Early life and family ==
Granger was born Frances Rawstorn on 17 December 1945, the daughter of Frank and Nancy Rawstorn. She was educated in Timaru, and went on to marry Jack Granger, a police officer; the couple had two children.

== Netball career ==
=== Playing ===
Granger initially played netball for South Canterbury but transferred to Canterbury in 1973, following her husband's transfer to undertake training. Playing for Canterbury she moved from the goal attack (GA) position to wing attack (WA), but returned to goal attack when she moved back to South Canterbury. She made her debut for the New Zealand national netball team, against Singapore in October 1974, while en route to a tour of England in which the team was undefeated. It was a new experience for Granger, as the games were played indoors, whereas in New Zealand they were played outdoors. The following year, she was a member of the New Zealand team that finished third at the 1975 World Netball Tournament. Although that tournament was the end of her national career, she played for South Canterbury and Canterbury for 20 years in total, winning several trophies and being selected on five occasions to play for the South Island against the North Island.

=== Coaching ===
Granger coached the Canterbury representative team, and the Lincoln University team. She also assisted Margaret Foster when the latter was coach of the Canterbury Flames in the National Bank Cup during the mid 2000s. Among other appointments, Granger coached at Rangi Ruru Girls' School and the Rangiora High School. In 2001, Granger coached the netball team of Fiji, in the year they won the South Pacific Mini Games. In 2003, she went to Wales to spend three months as the national team's shooting coach. In 2012, she spent three months as a volunteer coach in Botswana, following this with a period of seven months in 2014.

== Other sports ==
Between 1965 and 1973, Granger represented Canterbury at the New Zealand Athletics Championships, achieving best results of third in the discus throw and javelin throw. For this, and her netball achievements, she was named South Canterbury Sportsperson of the Year in 1972, the first woman to receive the award.

== Death ==
Granger died in Rangiora on 29 April 2026, at the age of 80, having been predeceased by her husband, Jack Granger.
