= Beth Huntington =

New Zealand netball player

Personal information
- Full name: Beth Mavis Huntingdon (Née: Carnie)
- Born: 15 July 1945 (age 81)
- Height: 1.79 m (5 ft 10 in)

Netball career
- Playing positions: GS, GA
Years	National team	Caps
1974-75	New Zealand	13
Medal record
Representing New Zealand
World Netball Tournament
Bronze medal – third place	1975 Auckland	Tournament

Beth Huntington was a New Zealand netball player who represented her country on 13 occasions.

== Netball career ==
Beth Mavis Huntingdon (née Carnie) was born on 15 July 1945. She made her debut for the Silver Ferns, the New Zealand national netball team, on 15 October 1974 against Singapore, en route to a tour of England, where New Zealand remained unbeaten. Playing as a goal shoot (GS), she was known for her idiosyncratic shooting style. She was selected for the Silver Ferns team to take part in the 1975 World Netball Tournament, with New Zealand finishing in third place.

After retiring from playing Huntington continued her involvement with netball as a coach and was made a Life Member of Northern Suburbs Netball in Wellington.
