= Anne Taylor (netball player) =

New Zealand netball player

Personal information
- Full name: Née: Downey
- Born: 23 October 1953 (age 72) Matamata, New Zealand
- Height: 1.80 m (5 ft 11 in)
- Spouse: Phil Taylor

Netball career
- Playing positions: GA, GS, WA
Years	National team	Caps
1975	New Zealand	3
Medal record
Representing New Zealand
World Netball Tournament
Bronze medal – third place	1975 Auckland	Tournament

Anne Taylor (née Downey; born 23 October 1953) is a former netball player who represented New Zealand on three occasions, including in the 1975 World Netball Tournament.

== Early life ==
Anne Taylor attended Matamata College in Matamata in the Waikato region of New Zealand's North Island and then obtained a diploma in teaching of commerce and physical education from the Auckland Teachers' College, later known as the Auckland College of Education and now part of the University of Auckland.

== Netball career ==
Taylor had two elder sisters, Claire and Faye, who were both netball players, and she followed in their footsteps. She played for the Arahi netball team in Auckland at the age of 16 and then joined the Auckland team. While playing for Auckland she was selected for the North Island team to play the South Island. She was then chosen in 1974 for the New Zealand Under-24 team, which toured England and Australia and was the first New Zealand team to be coached by Dame Lois Muir. Taylor played in the Goal Shooter (GS), Goal attack (GA) and Wing attack (WA) positions.

Taylor was selected for the New Zealand national netball team, known as the Silver Ferns, for the 1975 World Netball Tournament, making her debut against Fiji on 26 August, and playing in two other matches. New Zealand came third in the tournament.

== Later life ==
In 1974, Taylor returned to Matamata College, as a teacher of accounting and physical education. Married to Phil Taylor, she left the school in 1978 to have four children, returning to the College in 1985. Her two daughters went to the same school and played for its netball team, which Taylor coached for a number of years.
