= Elisa Robati =

New Zealand netball player and coach

Personal information
- Full name: (Née: Taringa)
- Born: 21 July 1973 (age 52)
- Occupation: Netball coach
- Height: 1.79 m (5 ft 10 in)

Netball career
- Playing positions: GA, GS
Years	National team	Caps
1995	New Zealand	6
Medal record
Representing New Zealand
Netball World Cup
Bronze medal – third place	1995 Birmingham, UK	Tournament

Elisa Robati is a former netball player who played on six occasions for the New Zealand national netball team. She presently coaches netball in Queensland, Australia.

== Netball career ==
Elisa Robati (née Taringa) was born on 21 July 1973. She played for the Bay of Plenty. Playing as a Goal shooter (GS) and Goal attack (GA), she was selected for the Young Internationals of New Zealand and then for the Under-21 team. In 1994, she was chosen for the national team, known as the Silver Ferns, playing her first game on 1 March 1995 against South Africa. In 1995 she was a member of the Silver Ferns team in the 1995 World Netball Championships, held in Birmingham, England, when New Zealand finished third. After 1995 her career as a player came to an end as a result of injury.

Robati moved to Queensland in Australia and coached club teams and schools. Since 2012 she has been Head netball coach at the Trinity Anglican School in Cairns. She has coached the Peninsula (North Queensland) Under-19s team in the Queensland School Sports State Championships. She is also the coach of the North Cairns Tigers.
