= Taini Jamison =

New Zealand netball coach and administrator (1928–2023)

Taini Jamison OBE
Personal information
- Full name: Taini Maremare Jamison (née: Royal)
- Born: 23 February 1928 Rotorua, New Zealand
- Died: 28 April 2023 (aged 95) Rotorua, New Zealand
- Occupation: Schoolteacher
- Spouse: Tom Jamison (m. 1953; died 1953)
- Children: 1
- Relative: Rangi Royal (father)
- School: Rotorua High School; Wellington Girls' College
- University: Wellington Teachers' Training College

Netball career
Coaching career
- Years: Team
- Rotorua
- 1967–1971: New Zealand

Taini Maremare Jamison OBE (née Royal; 23 February 1928 – 28 April 2023) was a New Zealand netball coach and administrator. She coached the New Zealand national netball team to its first world title at the 1967 World Netball Tournament. The Taini Jamison Trophy, contested between New Zealand and visiting international teams other than Australia, is named in her honour.

== Early life and family ==
Jamison was born Taini Maremare Royal in Rotorua on 23 February 1928. Her father, Te Rangiātaahua Kiniwē Royal, was of Ngāti Raukawa and Ngāti Tamaterā descent, and her mother, Irihapeti Te Puhi-o-Rākaiora Taiaroa, was from Ngāi Tahu. Her father worked for the Māori Land Court and was often away from home carrying out surveys. The family briefly moved to Ruatoki in the eastern Bay of Plenty because of his job. He served with the Māori Battalion in World War II, was badly wounded and was awarded the Military Cross. Jamison studied at Rotorua High and Grammar School, but when her father was posted to Wellington after the war she moved to Wellington Girls' College, later studying at Wellington Teachers' Training College. In Wellington, she joined the Ngāti Pōneke Young Māori Club, which was much in demand to perform at government functions. She recalled performing for the famous British singer Gracie Fields, when Fields was touring the South Pacific in 1945.

After qualifying as a teacher, she had several different postings. When based in Horohoro, near Rotorua, she met her husband, Tom Jamison, who was coaching the local basketball team. Three months after they married, he died after an accident on the basketball court. She was already pregnant and her son was named after her husband. She did not remarry. Jamison spent eight years teaching in Horohoro before moving to Malfroy Primary School in Rotorua, where she stayed until reaching retirement age.

== Netball career ==
Jamison's interest in netball began at a young age. She progressed to being a member of the Rotorua representative team, which won the national championships, and she was selected for the North Island team on three occasions. She retired from competition in 1959, after which she spent a decade coaching the Rotorua team. She also competed in tennis tournaments.

In 1967, Jamison coached the New Zealand national netball team that won the 1967 World Netball Tournament. Four years later, she coached the New Zealand team to the runners-up position in the 1971 World Netball Tournament, when the team was away from home for almost four months. She was the first Māori coach of the New Zealand netball team, and is its most successful coach, having a percentage win rate of 90 per cent. Jamison was involved for nearly all of her adult life with Netball Rotorua and was its president from 1981 to 2001.

== Death and legacy ==
Jamison died in Rotorua on 28 April 2023, aged 95.

In 2008, the Taini Jamison Trophy, named in Jamison's honour, was established. It is contested when any netballing nation or nations, other than Australia, play the Silver Ferns in New Zealand.

== Awards and honours ==
In 1972, Jamison was awarded the Netball New Zealand Service Award. In 1990, she received the New Zealand 1990 Commemoration Medal. In the 1994 New Year Honours, she was appointed an Officer of the Order of the British Empire, for services to netball. In 1996, the New Zealand netball team coached by Jamison that won the 1967 world championship was inducted into the New Zealand Sports Hall of Fame. As an individual, Jamison was inducted into the Māori Sports Hall of Fame in 2006, and in 2010, she was made a life member of Netball New Zealand.

In 2024, Jamison was an inaugural inductee to the Netball New Zealand Hall of Fame.
