= Rotorua Girls' High School =

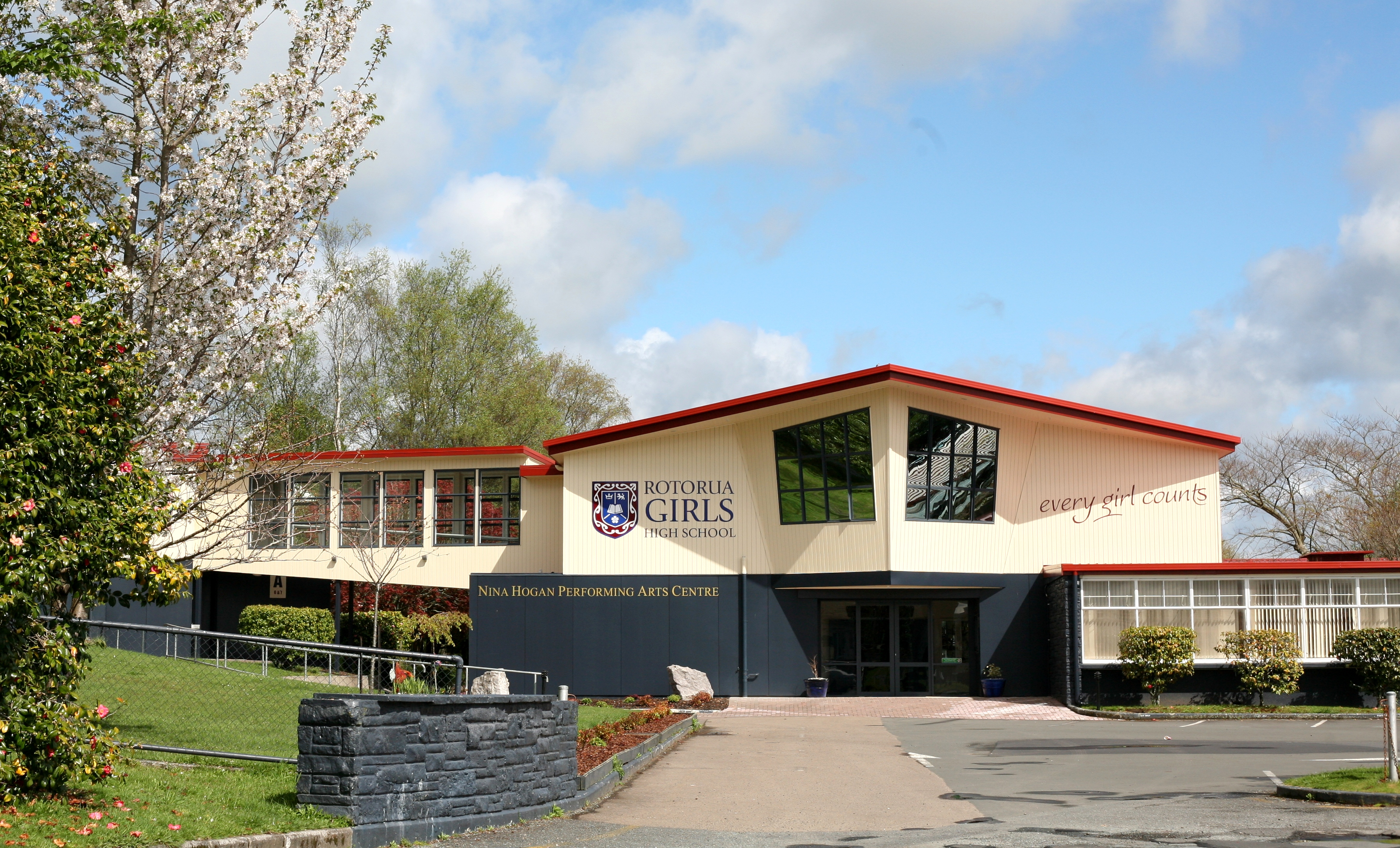

Location
- 251 Old Taupo Road; Hillcrest; Rotorua 3015; New Zealand; 38.1479°S 176.2374°E

Information
- Type: State Single sex girls secondary (Year 9–13)
- Motto: Crafting future leaders
- Established: 1959
- Ministry of Education Institution no.: 153
- Principal: Sarah Davis
- Enrolment: 642 (July 2026)
- Socio-economic decile: 3G
- Website: http://www.rghs.school.nz

Rotorua Girls' High School is a state school educating girls from Year 9 to Year 13, located in Rotorua, New Zealand.

== History ==
Rotorua Girls' High School was formed in 1959 after Rotorua High School, founded in 1927, was divided into Rotorua Boys' High School and Rotorua Girls'. Rotorua Boys' kept the original site, and the Rotorua Girls' was given a new site further down Old Taupo Road.

== Enrolment ==
As of July 2026, Rotorua Girls' High School has roll of 642 students, of which 464 (72.3%) identify as Māori.

As of 2026, the school has an Equity Index of 522, placing it amongst schools whose students have the most socioeconomic barriers to achievement (roughly equivalent to deciles 1 and 2 under the former socio-economic decile system).

== Houses ==
The three houses of Rotorua Girls' High School are named after Maori women.

- Taini – Purple
- Makereti – Pink
- Witarina – Orange

These have returned to former houses as of 2020.

- Rangiuru – Green
- Karenga – Blue
- Rukuwai – Yellow
- Hinemoa – Red

== Principals ==
- Nina Hogan 1959–1967
- Sheila Peacocke 1967–1984
- Alison Thomson 1985–1997
- Annette Joyce 1997–2013
- Ally Gibbons 2013–2018
- Sarah Davis 2019–present

== Notable alumnae ==
- Claire Charters, academic
- Natalie Delamere, rugby union player
- Tania Tapsell, New Zealand politician
- Georgia Cubbon, radio announcer (notably for Radio Hauraki and The Sound)
