= Yvonne Willering =

Dutch-born New Zealand netball coach and former player

Yvonne Willering CNZM
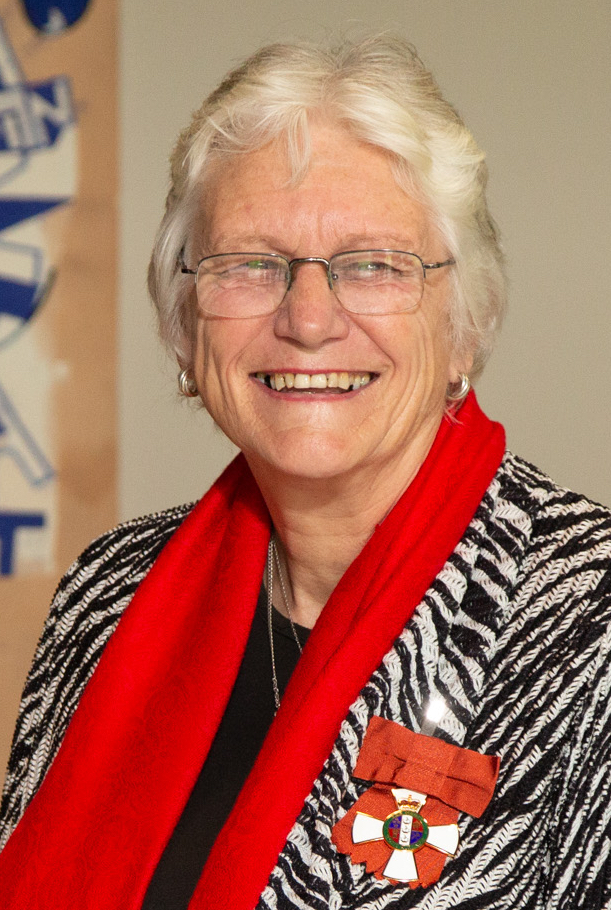
- Willering in 2019

Personal information
- Full name: Yvonne Mignon Willering
- Born: 15 January 1950 (age 76) The Netherlands
- Occupation: Professional netball coach

Netball career
Years	National team	Caps
1974–1983	New Zealand national team	57
Coaching career
- Years: Team
- 1997–2001: New Zealand national team
- 2002–2003: Fiji national team
Medal record
Representing New Zealand
World Netball Tournament
Gold medal – first place	1979 Port of Spain	Tournament
Silver medal – second place	1983 Singapore	Tournament
Bronze medal – third place	1975 Auckland	Tournament

Yvonne Mignon Willering CNZM (born 15 January 1950) is a Dutch-born New Zealand netball coach and former representative netball player. Willering played for the New Zealand national netball team – the Silver Ferns – from 1974 to 1983. She was coach of the Silver Ferns from 1997 to 2001, and coach of the Fijian national team from 2002 to 2003.

In the 2002 Queen's Birthday and Golden Jubilee Honours, Willering was appointed an Officer of the New Zealand Order of Merit, for services to netball. In the 2019 Queen's Birthday Honours, she was elevated to Companion of the New Zealand Order of Merit, also for services to netball.

In 2024, she became the co-coach and mentor for Game on, but departs partway through the final tournament for former rival, Norma Palmer's 80th birthday.

On 18 October 2026, Willering was inducted into the Netball New Zealand Hall of Fame.
