= Weymouth, New Zealand =

Suburb of Auckland

Weymouth
- Suburb
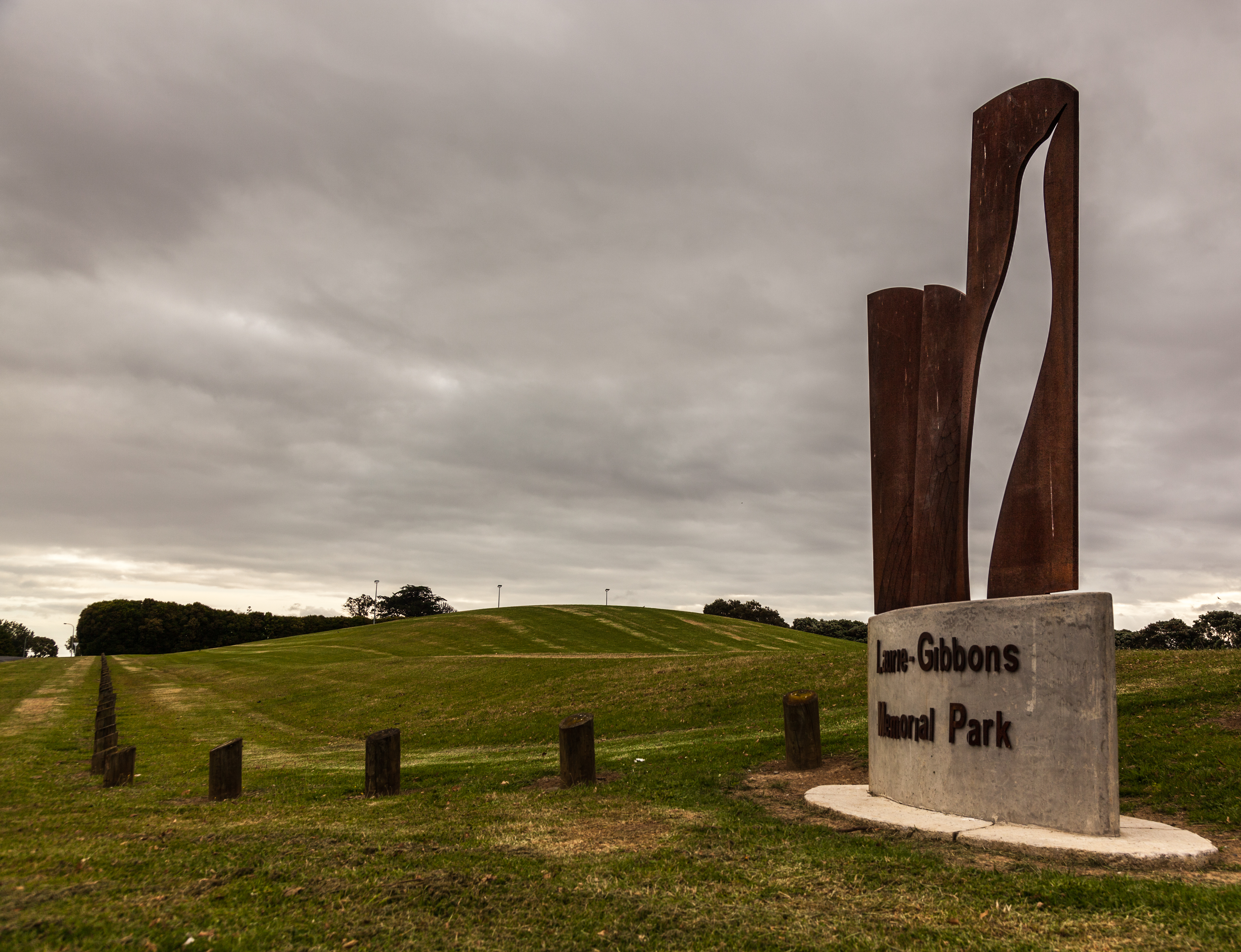
- Laurie Gibbons Memorial Park
- Interactive map of Weymouth
- Coordinates: 37°02′30″S 174°51′55″E
- Country: New Zealand
- City: Auckland
- Local authority: Auckland Council
- Electoral ward: Manurewa-Papakura ward
- Local board: Manurewa Local Board

Area
  - Land: 283 ha (700 acres)

Population (June 2025)
  - Total: 12,910
  - Density: 4,560/km^{2} (11,800/sq mi)

	Clendon Park	Manurewa
(Manukau Harbour)	Weymouth	Conifer Grove
	(Pahurehure Inlet); Karaka	Wattle Downs

Weymouth, also known as Weymouth by the sea, is a southern suburb of Auckland, New Zealand. It is located adjacent to Clendon Park and Manurewa, some 25 kilometres (16 mi) southeast of Auckland city centre, and is sited on a peninsula between the southeastern shore of the Manukau Harbour and that Harbour's Pahurehure Inlet.

Weymouth is connected to the Auckland Southern Motorway via Mahia Road, an arterial route which cuts across the suburb's northeastern corner.

== History ==
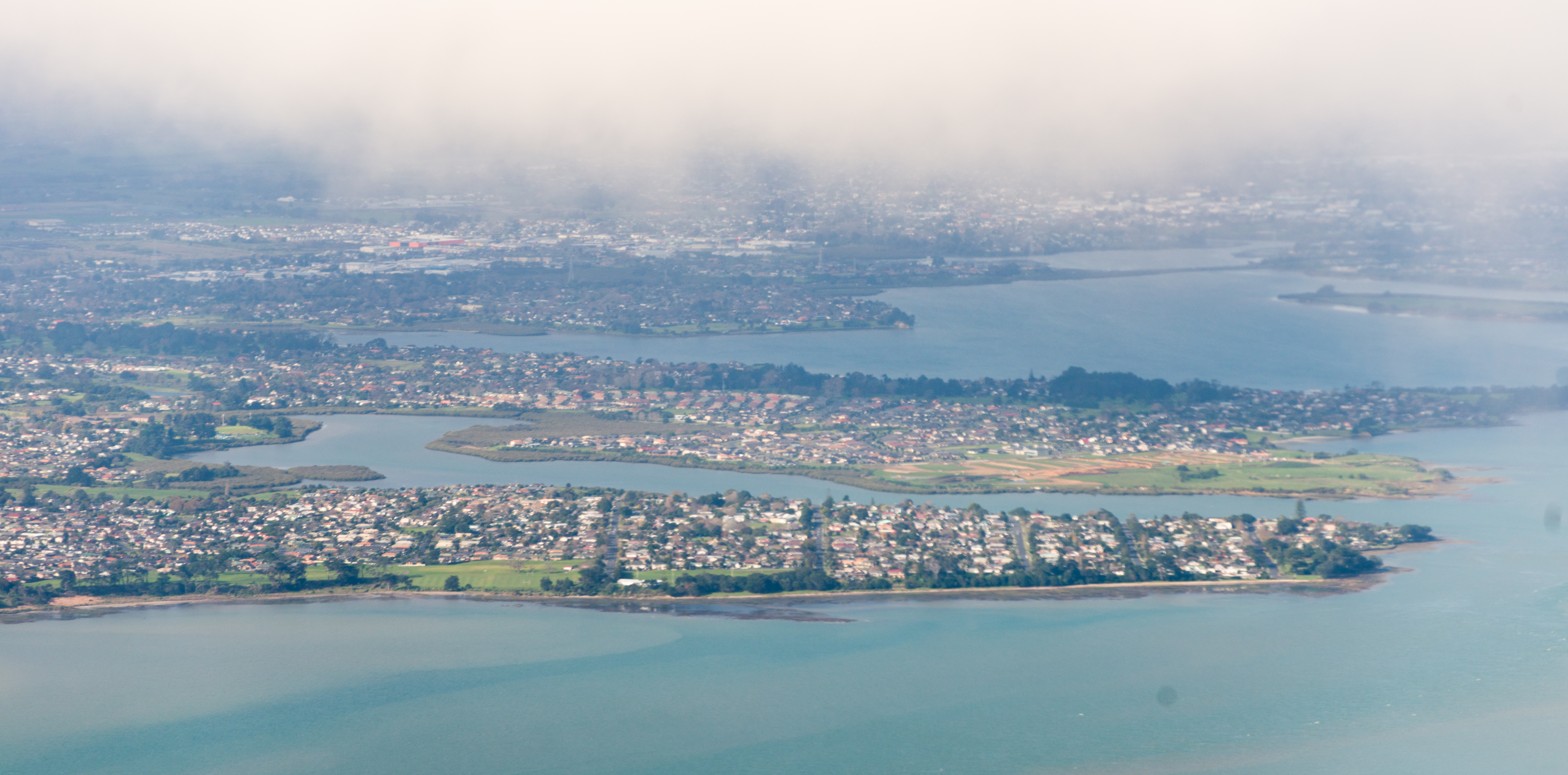
Weymouth (foreground) and Wattle Downs (behind)

The traditional name for the Weymouth area is Waimāhia, meaning "the muffled waters", referring to how sounds of the Manukau Harbour would sound distorted in unexpected ways in the area. The name can also be understood as a reference to Reremoana Te Māhia, the daughter of Te Ākitai Waiohua chief Te Wirihana.

The Weymouth settlement was surveyed for the first time in 1857, with property sales starting in 1864. The name 'Weymouth' was speculated to be named after an immigrant ship, however, there is no evidence that any ship bearing that name ever visited New Zealand before 1866. It is more probabable that the name was selected because it was thought to sound close to "Waimahia," the Maori name for the area, or as a sentimental homage to the English coastal resort of Weymouth.

All the streets south of Blanes Road were included in the original hamlet when it was surveyed, and several of these streets were named from early European settlers who lived there.

Weymouth's most prominent early use was as the Karaka ferry's embarking location. In order to avoid a lengthy detour via Drury, this bridged the Papakura Channel between Weymouth and Karaka, providing travellers with a direct path to Waiuku in the south. There may have been a private ferry service as early as 1856. In 1860, the Auckland Provincial Council launched the official service. The Karaka Highway Board then took over, but by 1880 the service was shut down.

Since 1872, there have been several plans to construct a bridge between Weymouth and Karaka. Weymouth became a well-liked vacation spot and the location of an annual regatta around the beginning of the 20th century.

Weymouth had large amounts of Chinese immigration starting in the 1920s who set up market gardens using the fertile alluvial soil.

The Weymouth Memorial Hall, was constructed as a privately owned hall in 1926, but was sold to the Manukau County Council in 1940. The Weymouth wharf was inaugurated in 1914. In the 1930s, an oyster farm was located on the shore, and it supplied a number of Auckland restaurants and fish markets with oysters.

Weymouth was relatively isolated from other communities until the development of Clendon Park began in the 1970s. A defined boundary between the two suburbs was introduced by the Weymouth Residents & Ratepayers Association in 1990.

== Demographics ==
Weymouth covers 2.83 km^{2} (1.09 sq mi) and had an estimated population of 12,910 as of June 2025, with a population density of 4,562 people per km^{2}.

Historical population
Year	Pop.	±% p.a.
2006	9,273	—
2013	9,192	−0.13%
2018	11,622	+4.80%
2023	11,712	+0.15%
The 2006 population is for a larger area of 3.07 km^{2}. Source:

Weymouth had a population of 11,712 in the 2023 New Zealand census, an increase of 90 people (0.8%) since the 2018 census, and an increase of 2,520 people (27.4%) since the 2013 census. There were 5,826 males, 5,859 females and 27 people of other genders in 2,925 dwellings. 2.1% of people identified as LGBTIQ+. The median age was 29.7 years (compared with 38.1 years nationally). There were 3,054 people (26.1%) aged under 15 years, 2,874 (24.5%) aged 15 to 29, 4,872 (41.6%) aged 30 to 64, and 915 (7.8%) aged 65 or older.

People could identify as more than one ethnicity. The results were 22.9% European (Pākehā); 29.3% Māori; 46.8% Pasifika; 22.5% Asian; 2.7% Middle Eastern, Latin American and African New Zealanders (MELAA); and 0.9% other, which includes people giving their ethnicity as "New Zealander". English was spoken by 92.0%, Māori language by 7.6%, Samoan by 14.3%, and other languages by 22.3%. No language could be spoken by 3.2% (e.g. too young to talk). New Zealand Sign Language was known by 0.6%. The percentage of people born overseas was 36.0, compared with 28.8% nationally.

Religious affiliations were 48.2% Christian, 8.0% Hindu, 3.7% Islam, 3.0% Māori religious beliefs, 1.0% Buddhist, 0.1% New Age, 0.1% Jewish, and 1.1% other religions. People who answered that they had no religion were 27.8%, and 7.2% of people did not answer the census question.

Of those at least 15 years old, 1,146 (13.2%) people had a bachelor's or higher degree, 4,305 (49.7%) had a post-high school certificate or diploma, and 3,213 (37.1%) people exclusively held high school qualifications. The median income was $37,300, compared with $41,500 nationally. 441 people (5.1%) earned over $100,000 compared to 12.1% nationally. The employment status of those at least 15 was that 4,374 (50.5%) people were employed full-time, 774 (8.9%) were part-time, and 423 (4.9%) were unemployed.

Individual statistical areas
Name	Area (km^{2})	Population	Density (per km^{2})	Dwellings	Median age	Median income
Weymouth West	0.50	2,331	4,662	555	29.4 years	$36,500
Weymouth Central	0.61	2,952	4,839	708	27.6 years	$40,400
Weymouth East	0.67	2,679	3,999	624	29.4 years	$34,500
Weymouth South	1.06	3,750	3,538	1,038	31.4 years	$37,400
New Zealand					38.1 years	$41,500

== Amenities ==
A public walkway is found along the shores of the Manukau Harbour at Weymouth.

== Education ==
Weymouth Primary School is a coeducational contributing primary school (years 1–6), with a roll of 551 as of July 2026. Their Māori language unit caters for years 1–8.
