= Reremoana Primary School =

Location
- Scotsmoor Drive, Wattle Downs; Auckland; New Zealand; 37.0508°S 174.8768°E

Information
- Type: State coed primary, years 1-8
- Motto: Learn, Grow, Succeed!
- Established: 2006
- Ministry of Education Institution no.: 6978
- Principal: Julie Cowan
- Enrolment: 423 (July 2026)
- Socio-economic decile: 9
- Website: reremoana.school.nz

Reremoana School is a full primary school (years 1-8) in Wattle Downs, Auckland, New Zealand. The school was opened on February 8, 2006. The school enrolment zone encompasses the majority of the Wattle Downs peninsula.

The school currently has 20 classroom spaces, which operate as hubs of two in each team.

== Symbolism ==
The school carries the ancestral name of Reremoana Te Māhia, the daughter of Te Wirihana and granddaughter of Ihaka Takaanini. Their names are recognized as Wiri and Takaanini locally. Translated, Reremoana means ‘waters flowing to the sea’.

The school's layout is designed to be shaped like a kite, alluding to a local legend of a kite flying competition in which a kite line was severed and drifted away. The owner of the kite was Chief Tamapahore, who had a pā (fortified village) on Matuku-tururu (Wiri Mountain).

== Principals ==
- 2006 - 2013: Viki Holley
- 2014 - 2015: Lisa Harland
- 2017–Present Day: Julie Cowan
