= Papakura Stream =

Stream in South Auckland, New Zealand

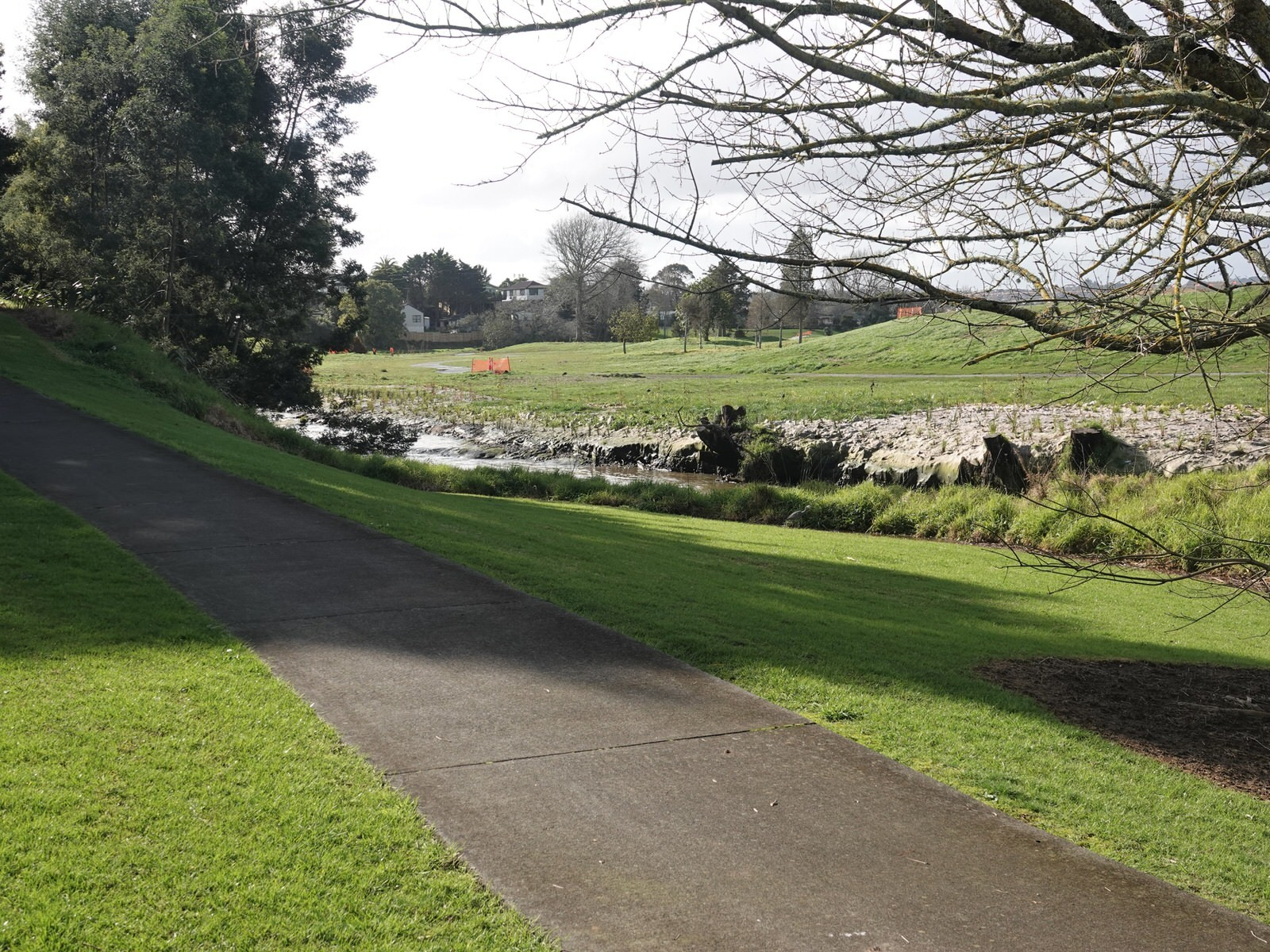
- The Papakura Stream at Wattle Downs

- Mouth of the Papakura Stream Papakura Stream (New Zealand)
- Route of the Papakura Stream

Location
- Country: New Zealand
- Region: Auckland Region

Physical characteristics
- Source: Solway Road, Whitford
  - coordinates: 36.94636°S 175.01349°E
- Mouth: Pahurehure Inlet
  - coordinates: 37.04534°S 174.90089°E
- Length: 63 kilometres

Basin features
- Progression: Papakura Stream → Pahurehure Inlet → Manukau Harbour

The Papakura Stream, also known as the Papakura Creek, is a major stream in South Auckland, in the Auckland Region of New Zealand's North Island. It flows south-west from near the Brookby to the Pahurehure Inlet of the Manukau Harbour. The stream forms the border between Manurewa and Papakura.

== Description ==
The stream begins in the Whitford Forest north of Brookby township, flowing south-west through farmland of the Brookby Valley, and through the suburbs of Alfriston, Randwick Park, Takanini and Manurewa. The stream reaches the Pahurehure Inlet of the Manukau Harbour, flowing past Wattle Downs to the west and Waiata Shores to the east. The stream is approximately 63 kilometres long, with a catchment of approximately 4,100 hectares.

Papakura Stream is occasionally referred to as Māhia Stream.

== Biodiversity ==
The stream is a known habitat for koura (native freshwater crayfish).

== History ==
The stream is in the traditional rohe of Waiohua, including Ngāti Te Ata Waiohua and Te Ākitai Waiohua, as well as Ngāi Tai ki Tāmaki. The stream was used as a source for freshwater resources, including koura and eels. By the early colonial era, the catchment of the stream was used by European settlers and Māori to harvest timber and flax. During European settlement, the stream was highly modified for agriculture.

The stream was used by the Lactos Ltd factory in the 1930s as a source of water, and from 1949, the East Tamaki Co-operative Dairy Company constructed a milk powder factory on the east side of stream in Takanini. The stream would regularly flood in the 1950s, causing problems for the factory.

The Papakura Stream formed the border between Manukau City and the Papakura District from 1989 to 2010.

By the late 2010s, the stream had become one of the more polluted waterways in the Auckland Region. A major volunteer regeneration project for the stream began in 2021, with an estimated 11,000 native trees planted along the stream's banks in the first year.

== Amenities ==
The stream has two shared paths as it reaches the Manukau Harbour: the Wattle Downs South Path on the western banks, and the Waiata Shores Shared Path, on the southeastern banks further upstream. A footbridge has been proposed to link Wattle Downs to Waiata Shores.

== See also ==
- List of rivers of New Zealand
