= Weymouth Primary School =

School in Weymouth, New Zealand

Location
- 23 Evans Road, Weymouth, Auckland 2103; 37.046592°S 174.865615°E

Information
- Type: State Co-Ed Contributing (Year 1-6)
- Ministry of Education Institution no.: 1570
- Principal: Saane Faaofo-Oldehaver
- Enrolment: 379 (July 2026)
- Website: www.weymouthprimary.school.nz

Weymouth Primary School is a Primary School (years 1–6) in Weymouth, a suburb of South Auckland, New Zealand.

== History ==
The first school in Weymouth was opened on 7 September 1891, at a site on Weymouth Road. It soon became the focal point for the Weymouth community, and was the site of major social events, including concerts and dances. In 1914, the All Saints Anglican Church hall was built adjacent to the site, and as the school grew, classes began to be held in the hall. In 1946, the Education Board closed the school due to overcrowding, and students were moved to central Manurewa schools.

By 1960, Weymouth had grown enough that a school was established again for the community, which opened on Evans Road.

Weymouth Primary School has a Māori language immersion unit, which caters for years 1–8.
