= Takaanini railway station =

Train station in Auckland, New Zealand

Takaanini
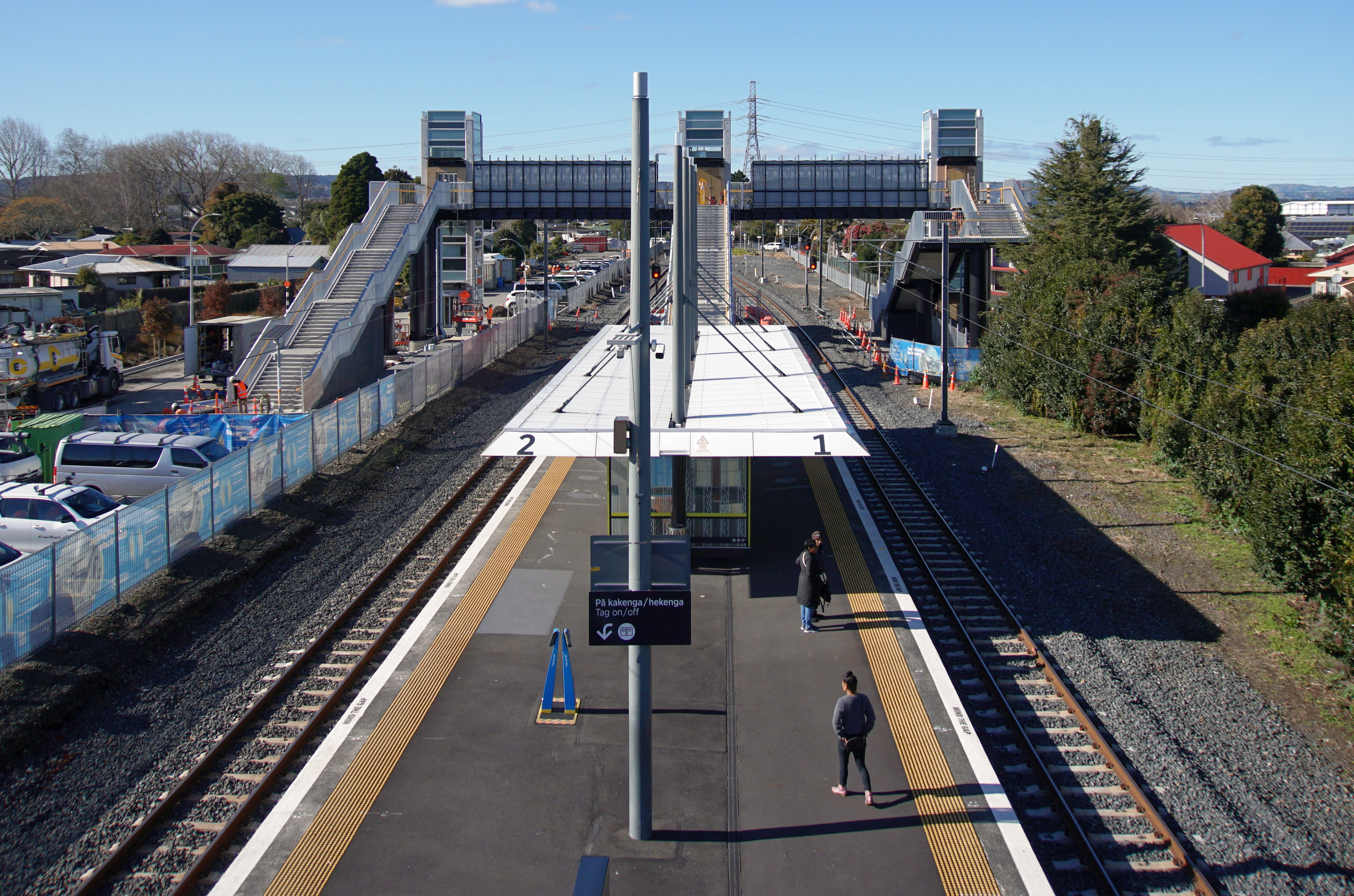
- View of the station from the temporary pedestrian overbridge, 2026.

General information
- Other names: Takanini
- Location: Takanini, Auckland; New Zealand
- Coordinates: 37.0409°S 174.9191°E
- System: Auckland Transport Urban rail
- Owner: KiwiRail (track and platforms); Auckland Transport (buildings)
- Operator: Auckland One Rail
- Line: North Island Main Trunk
- Distance: 650.64 km (404.29 mi) from Wellington
- Platforms: Island platform (P1 & P2)
- Tracks: Mainline (2)

Construction
- Parking: Yes
- Cycle facilities: Yes
- Accessible: No

Other information
- Fare zone: Southern Manukau

History
- Opened: October 1913
- Electrified: 2014

Passengers
- 2011: 1,062 passengers/weekday

Services
Preceding station	Auckland Transport (Auckland One Rail)	Following station
Papakura towards Pukekohe	South City Line	Te Mahia towards Newmarket

Adjacent stations
Preceding station	KiwiRail	Following station
Te Mahia	North Island Main Trunk	Tironui; Closed 1983
Location

Takaanini railway station, officially spelt Takanini, is on the South City line of the Auckland railway network in New Zealand. The station has an island platform layout and is accessed from Manuroa Road, Station Road and Taka Street in the Takanini suburb of Auckland.

== History ==
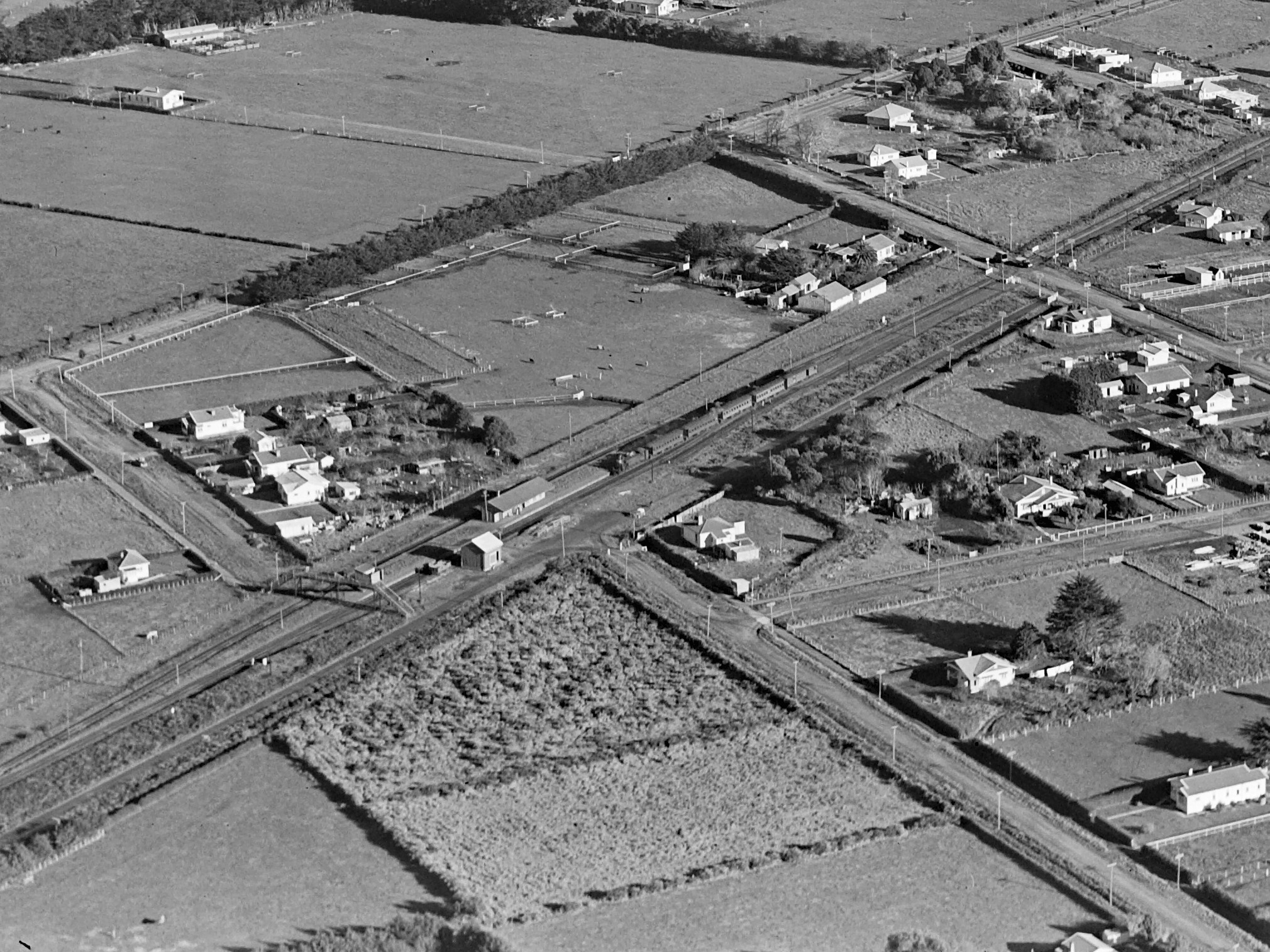
The station in 1950.

The railway through Takaanini was opened on 20 May 1875, as part of the Auckland and Mercer Railway, built by Brogden & Co, who extended it from Penrose. Steam trains would stop to take on water near the Papakura river between today’s Te Mahia and Takaanini stations. On 6 November 1908 the line became part of the North Island Main Trunk, with services reaching Wellington.

On 25 June 1913 a station at a place known as Lupton's Crossing, at 16 miles 73 chains, was approved. It was originally intended to call the station 'Glenora' after the nearby historic estate of Glenora Park. The station was opened in October 1913 as the Takanini railway station. Land for the station was donated by locals. In 1914 the Maru Land Company subdivided the 'Town of Takanini' around the station.

On 16 April 1915, a Post Office operated by Railways Department staff opened; it was removed from the station on 14 January 1920. In 1923 a proposal to add a ladies waiting room (12' x 10') with toilet (about 8' x 10') was approved. By this point the station building consisted of a store (12' x 10'), tablet room (15' x 10'), and public lobby (18' x 10').

On 6 August 1923 a proposal to add a goods shed was approved. Later a 20' x 30' shed was built.

Duplication of the tracks between Papatoetoe and Papakura started in 1929 as an employment relief scheme On 29 March 1931 the second track between Papatoetoe and Papakura opened. In 1931 a wooden footbridge with three sets of stairs connecting the island platform with Maru Road and Station Road was constructed (Bridge No 340 NIMT.)

The name of the station has long been controversial. In 1930, at the request of the Akarana Maori Association, the Honorary Geographic Advisory Board recommended changing the spelling of the station to Takaanini. This decision was gazetted as official in 1948. However, the use of Takanini remained almost universal, and in 1950 became the official spelling once more.

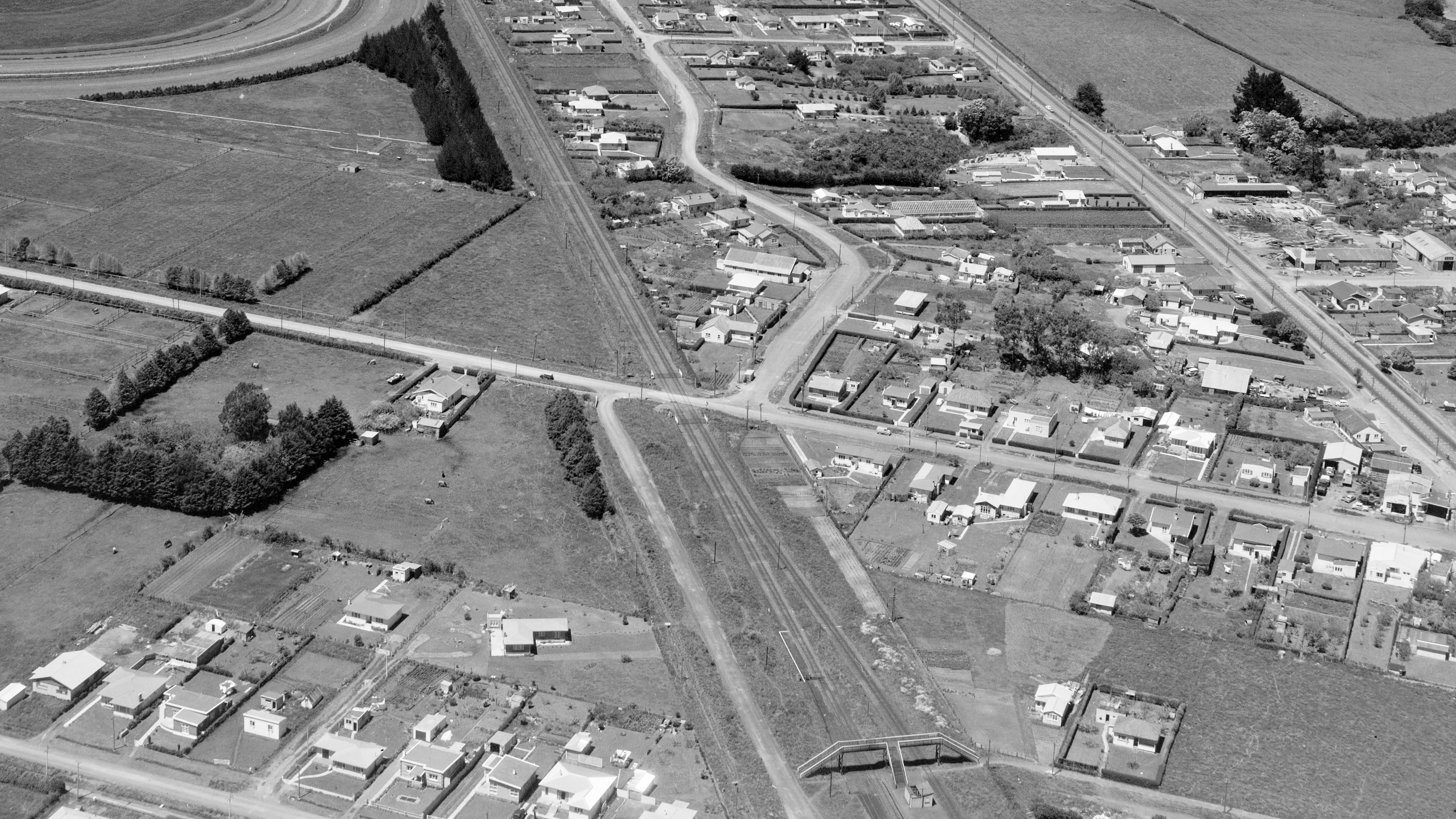
Taka Street level crossing, 1957.

On 3 October 1952 a proposal to install warning signals at the Lupton's Road (renamed to Spartan Road in 1972), Manuroa Road, and Taka Road level crossings, estimated cost £3500, was approved.

In 1955 the goods shed was removed to Avondale. In 1966 the low-level loading bank was removed. Goods services were closed on 29 April 1980, with all redundant trackwork to be removed.

In 1970 the station building (built in 1914) was demolished. By 1977 A two metre high pipe and mesh fence had been erected to prevent illegal access across the track.

In 1993 New Zealand’s rail system was sold to a private consortium which formed Tranz Rail. In 2001 the Labour-led government repurchased Auckland’s suburban rail system.

Second-hand diesel multiple units were introduced in 1993, purchased for the Auckland rail system from Perth in 1993. Nearly all stations were modified to accommodate the lack of external steps. The platforms at Takanini station were raised.

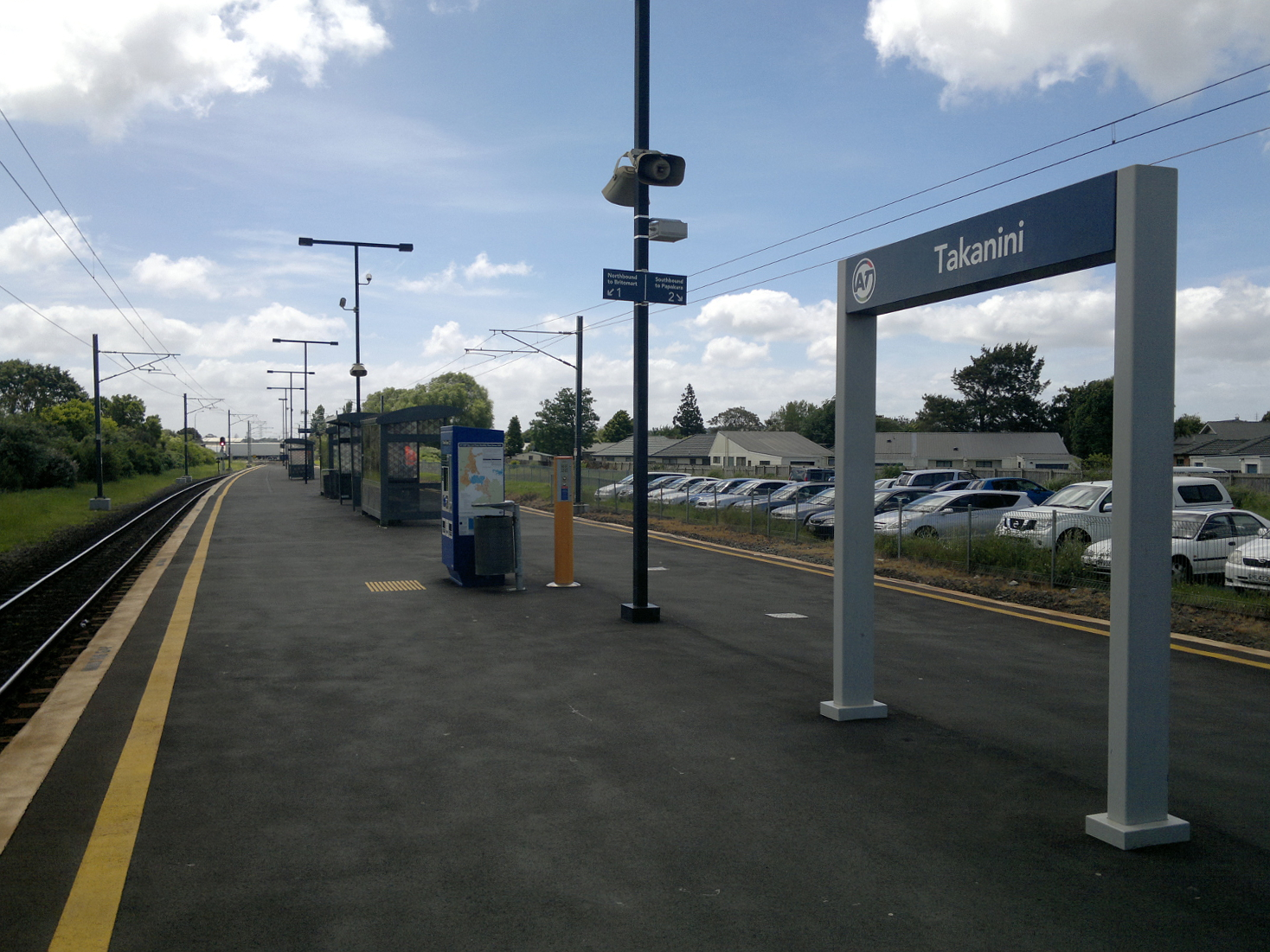
Small shelters and Takanini signage on the platform, 2014.

Two of the small shelters formerly used at the temporary Newmarket stations were relocated to Takanini station in 2010. In July 2013 the old shelter was demolished, then later an additional four small shelters were built. The small shelters were subsequently replaced by a large steel-frame glass-sided shelter built in 2018.

The line through the station was electrified in 2014.

On 19 October 2018, Auckland Transport changed the station's signage to Takaanini in line with Auckland Council's Māori language policy to reflect the correct spelling of Ihaka Takaanini after whom the area is named. Auckland Transport supported a proposal to officially alter the name to Takaanini but this proposal was rejected and the official name remains Takanini.

In 2019 a park and ride facility with more than 280 spaces was built next to the station.

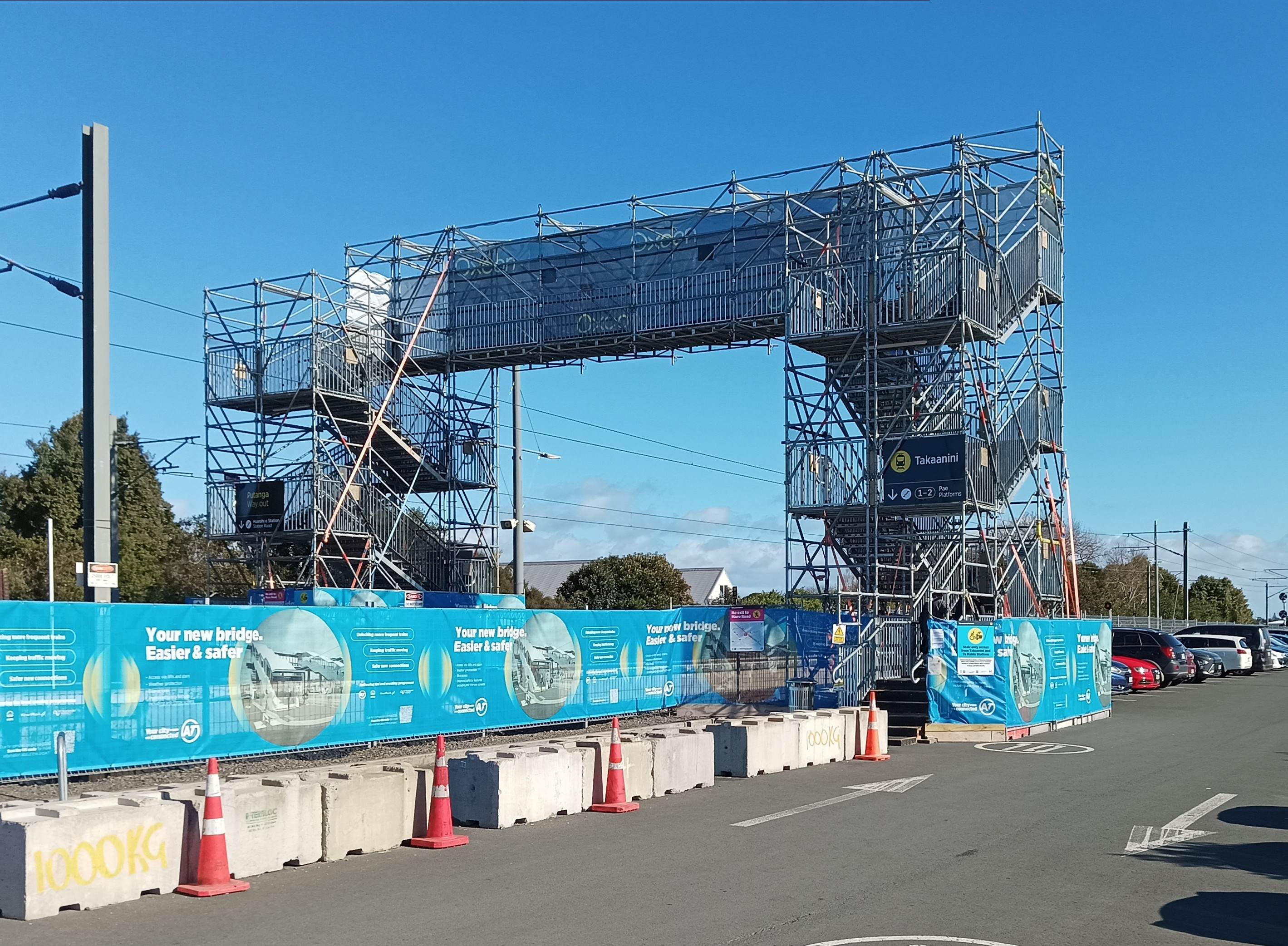
Temporary pedestrian bridge, 2026.

On 29 January 2026 the station level crossings were closed, replaced by a scaffolding bridge with two sets of stairs providing access to the platform from the carpark. A 2.5m wide concrete pedestrian bridge with 3 sets of stairs and 3 elevators (each with capacity for 26 people) is being constructed at the station. The design allows for the fourth tracking of the southern rail line. Construction commenced in September 2025 and was completed in September 2026.

== Services ==
Auckland One Rail, on behalf of Auckland Transport, operates South City line services between Newmarket and Pukekohe.

Bus routes 364 and 365 serve Takaanini Station and bus route 33 passes close by on Great South Road.

== See also ==
- List of Auckland railway stations
