= Wattle Downs =

- Suburb
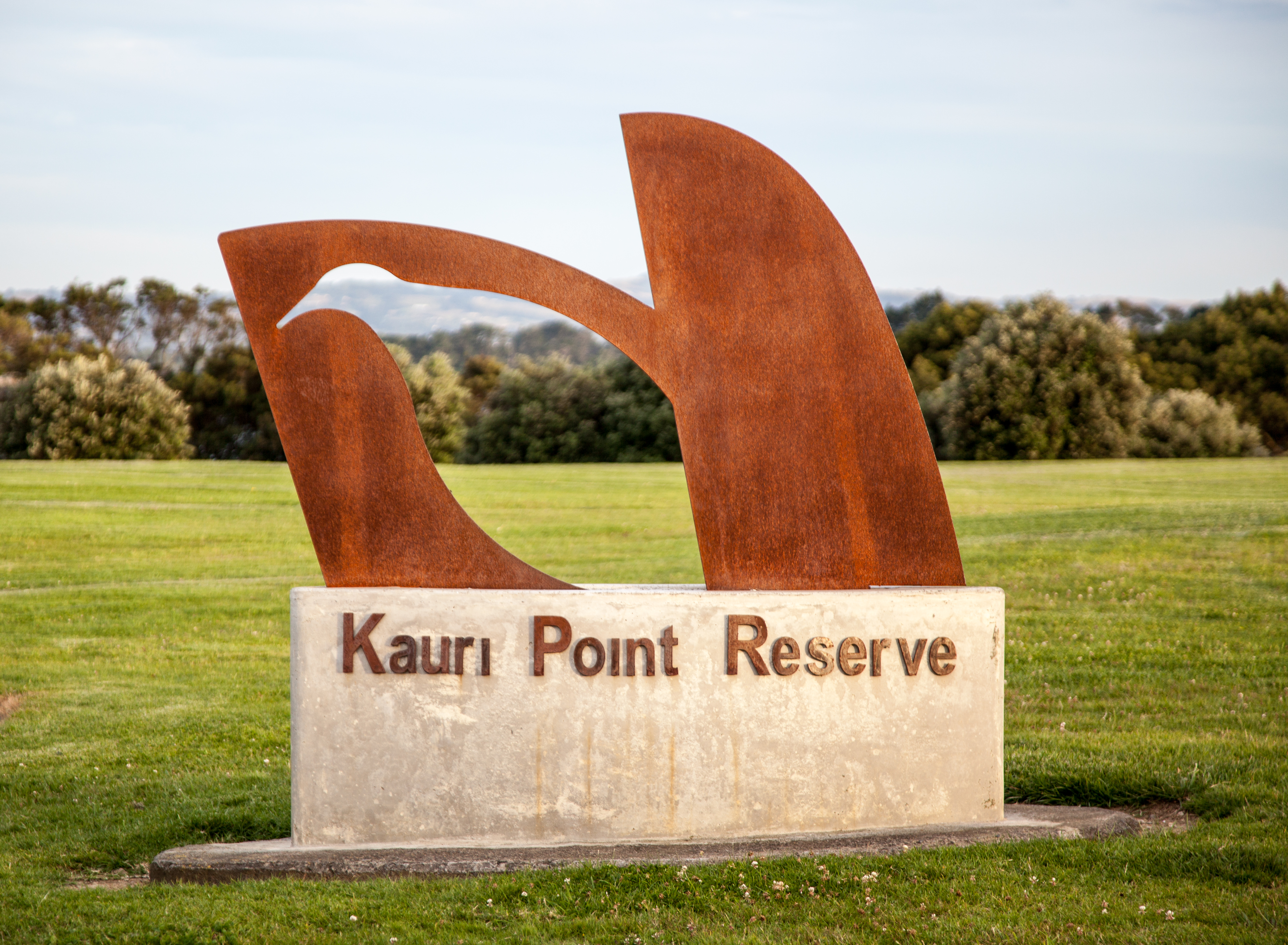
- Weathering steel sculpture of Kauri Point Reserve
- Interactive map of Wattle Downs
- Coordinates: 37.0499°S 174.8816°E
- Country: New Zealand
- City: Auckland
- Local authority: Auckland Council
- Electoral ward: Manurewa-Papakura ward
- Local board: Manurewa Local Board

Area
  - Land: 328 ha (810 acres)

Population (June 2025)
  - Total: 10,170
  - Density: 3,100/km^{2} (8,030/sq mi)
- Postcode: 2103

Clendon Park	Manurewa	Waiata Shores
Weymouth	Wattle Downs	(Pahurehure Inlet); Conifer Grove
(Pahurehure Inlet); Kingseat	(Pahurehure Inlet); Karaka	(Pahurehure Inlet); Takanini

Wattle Downs is a peninsula suburb of Auckland, New Zealand, situated on the Pahurehure Inlet of the Manukau Harbour. The suburb is governed by Auckland Council, and is characterized by its coastal reserves and the Wattle Downs Golf Course.

== Development ==
=== History ===
Wattle Downs was home to a Waiohua pā called Takirangaranga, meaning "upraised land".

Prior to residential development, 'Wattle Farm', was a 457 acre dairy farm. Its name originated from the 200-acre blackwood and silver leaf wattle grove planted on the peninsula in 1884 by farmer Mr White for an extract from the bark used in the tanning of skins. The project would subsequently fail due to planting the wrong trees, however, the name 'Wattle Farm' remained.

Under the company name Wattle Downs Ltd, the Kimptons, Campbells, and Clements families purchased Wattle Farm in 1933 during the Great Depression. The first residential development started around 1970, after developers acquired the farm following the rapid urban sprawl of surrounding suburbs. Dairy farming in the area would eventually come to an end in 2006.

=== Housing ===
The 'Wattledown estate' development takes place in the early 1970s after the Kimptons sold part of their farm to Northfield Mercantile Developments Ltd, during this time 1400 sections were planned on the southern end of the Wattle farm peninsula. The first houses were put on the market in 1974. The area was later developed by Roadways Development Limited, a subsidiary of Green & McCahill (Hugh Green Group) after Mercantile Developments Ltd went insolvent in 1978. Streets in this subdivision were named after prominent golf courses internationally as the subdivision was built and marketed around the Wattle Downs golf course. The Bluewater Cove subdivision, situated north of Wattle Farm Road was built alongside the establishing Wattle Downs development with the first houses on the market by 1976.

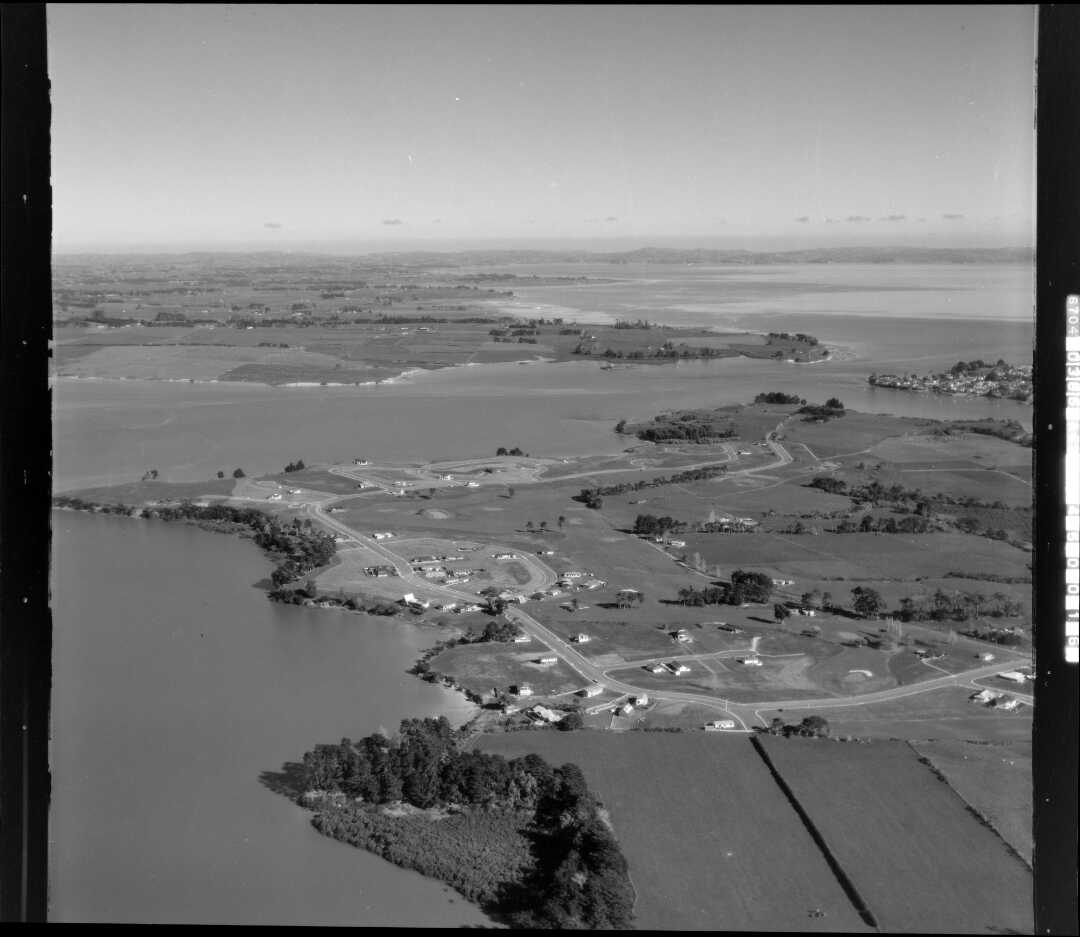
Aerial view of Wattle Downs during development in 1980 (pointing towards Manukau Harbour)

In 1992, Mahia Park, a 243-section upscale subdivision, built houses on the peninsula's east side adjacent to Papakura Stream. The Mahia Park name comes from the previous landowner Jim Webb who had established a thoroughbred stud on his farmland, In 1943 he had success with a winning stallion called Mahia Park, later naming the farm under that name. The section was subdivided by later owner Ian Ross, with houses being built from 1992 to the early 2000s.

Wattle Cove, a development jointly built by Winstone, Fletcher Building and Dempsey Morton, was a $300 million (NZD) subdivision that built 900 houses on the peninsula's west side throughout 2001 - 2016. A primary school and early learning centre was also built. Some roads in this development are also named after well-known golf courses, mainly from the United Kingdom. This subdivision of this land marked the end of the Kimptons dairy farm in 2006.

Acacia Cove, a retirement village, was opened in 1998 and currently has 217 villas and 15 self-contained apartments. Wattle Downs Care Home, operated by Bupa, was opened in March 2016 and is a further retirement community situated opposite Acacia Cove. It includes 60 rest homes, a medical and geriatric hospital and Bupa Short Stay services.

=== Environment ===
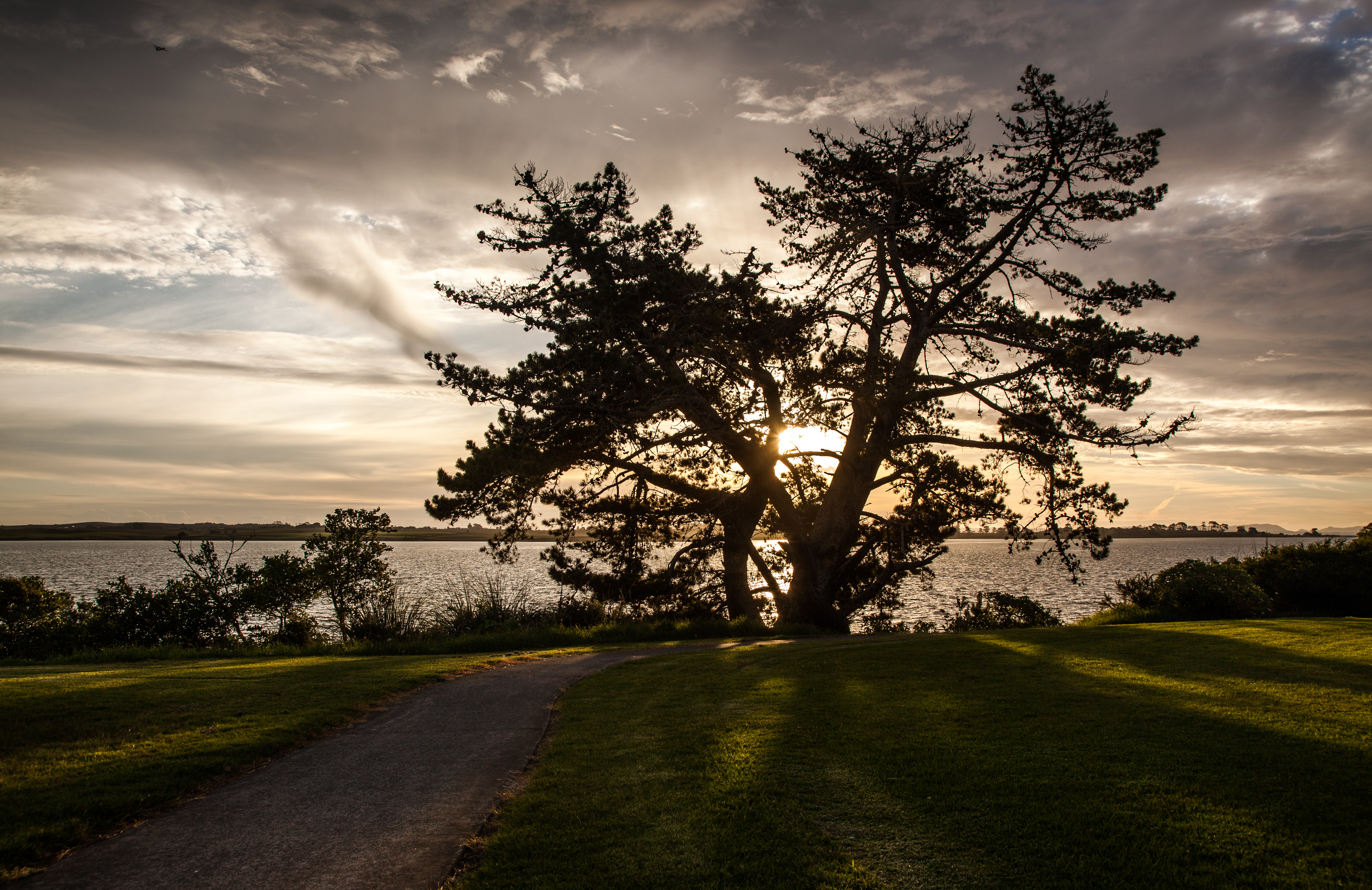
A Monterey pine tree in Moko-kauri / Kauri Point Reserve

The coastal environment of the peninsula features a mix of small beaches and mangrove forests, it has had erosion control implemented using rock retaining walls after a management plan by the former Manukau City Council was introduced in 1993 to combat seashore erosion in the suburb's coastal reserves.

Historically, Kauri trees were prominent in the area; it was a place where the Te Waiohua tribes collected Kauri resin as it was required to produce the tattoo pigment used in Tā moko (traditional Māori tattoos).

== Demographics ==
Wattle Downs covers 3.28 km^{2} (1.27 sq mi) and had an estimated population of 10,170 as of June 2025, with a population density of 3,101 people per km^{2}.

Historical population
Year	Pop.	±% p.a.
2006	6,813	—
2013	7,953	+2.23%
2018	9,087	+2.70%
2023	9,555	+1.01%
The 2006 population is for a smaller area of 3.06 km^{2}. Source:

Wattle Downs had a population of 9,555 in the 2023 New Zealand census, an increase of 468 people (5.2%) since the 2018 census, and an increase of 1,602 people (20.1%) since the 2013 census. There were 4,620 males, 4,896 females and 39 people of other genders in 2,817 dwellings. 2.2% of people identified as LGBTIQ+. The median age was 34.5 years (compared with 38.1 years nationally). There were 2,205 people (23.1%) aged under 15 years, 1,917 (20.1%) aged 15 to 29, 4,074 (42.6%) aged 30 to 64, and 1,359 (14.2%) aged 65 or older.

People could identify as more than one ethnicity. The results were 42.4% European (Pākehā); 25.2% Māori; 29.8% Pasifika; 21.4% Asian; 1.9% Middle Eastern, Latin American and African New Zealanders (MELAA); and 1.6% other, which includes people giving their ethnicity as "New Zealander". English was spoken by 92.9%, Māori language by 5.6%, Samoan by 8.2%, and other languages by 19.3%. No language could be spoken by 3.0% (e.g. too young to talk). New Zealand Sign Language was known by 0.5%. The percentage of people born overseas was 32.7, compared with 28.8% nationally.

Religious affiliations were 41.3% Christian, 4.8% Hindu, 2.0% Islam, 2.2% Māori religious beliefs, 0.9% Buddhist, 0.2% New Age, 0.1% Jewish, and 2.2% other religions. People who answered that they had no religion were 38.8%, and 7.6% of people did not answer the census question.

Of those at least 15 years old, 1,449 (19.7%) people had a bachelor's or higher degree, 3,609 (49.1%) had a post-high school certificate or diploma, and 2,283 (31.1%) people exclusively held high school qualifications. The median income was $42,000, compared with $41,500 nationally. 783 people (10.7%) earned over $100,000 compared to 12.1% nationally. The employment status of those at least 15 was that 3,786 (51.5%) people were employed full-time, 705 (9.6%) were part-time, and 294 (4.0%) were unemployed.

Individual statistical areas
Name	Area (km^{2})	Population	Density (per km^{2})	Dwellings	Median age	Median income
Wattle Downs West	1.48	3,861	2,609	1,275	38.0 years	$48,500
Wattle Downs North	0.79	3,408	4,314	837	27.4 years	$35,000
Wattle Downs East	1.02	2,283	2,238	705	40.7 years	$44,600
New Zealand					38.1 years	$41,500

== Education ==
Clayton Park School and Reremoana Primary School are full primary schools (years 1–8) with rolls of 326 and 423 students, respectively. Clayton Park opened in 1979. Reremoana opened on 7 February 2006. It was built to cater for the rapidly growing population in the local area.

South Auckland Middle School is a junior secondary school (years 7–10), with a roll of 180. It is a former charter school, and is now a designated special character school which teaches according to "applied Christian values".

Rolls are as of July 2026. All these schools are coeducational.

Wattle Downs is within the secondary school zone for Te Haikura a Kiwa, the area is also served by long-standing dedicated bus services that transport many local secondary students to out-of-zone and private schools, notably Rosehill College, Howick College and ACG Strathallan.

== Recreation ==
The Wattle Downs Path is a 7km shared path that follows the waterfront around the peninsula and links numerous esplanade reserves in the area. The path includes views over Waimahia Creek and Pahurehure Inlet towards Conifer Grove, Weymouth and Karaka. A footbridge across the Papakura Stream linking Wattle Downs to the newly established suburb of Waiata Shores has been proposed.

Notable parks include Tington Park, which includes a playground, basketball / volleyball court, and a rugby field.

=== Wattle Downs Golf Course ===
The Wattle Downs Golf Course is a 9-hole golf course nestled in the middle of the suburb. It was opened on 21 July 1979 during the early stages of the suburb's development and was co-designed by New Zealand professional golfer Sir Bob Charles.

=== Wattle Farm Ponds ===
The ponds at Wattle Farm Ponds Reserve were established in the 1960s. They were previously sewage treatment ponds serving the Manurewa district before being decommissioned in 1967 after the completion of the Mangere Treatment Plant. The reserve now contains a large wastewater pumping station and pumps most sewage from Manurewa into the Mangere Treatment Plant through the Southern Interceptor.

After the sewage ponds were decommissioned, the Manukau City Council acquired the land to be developed as Wattle Farm Reserve. The Northern Maritime Model Society, a model boating club, was established at the ponds in 1969.

The two ponds now act as a freshwater cleansing system to take the silt from the runoff of the Waimahia stream before it flows into the Manukau Harbour. The main pond is between 0.6m deep at the jetty end, to 1.6m at the far end by the tide gate. A $3.5 million improvement project of the reserve commenced throughout 2017-2018, and improved water quality and sediment management, new recreational facilities were also built. The ponds are used for radio-controlled boating, model yachting, waka ama racing.
