= Clendon Park =

- Suburb
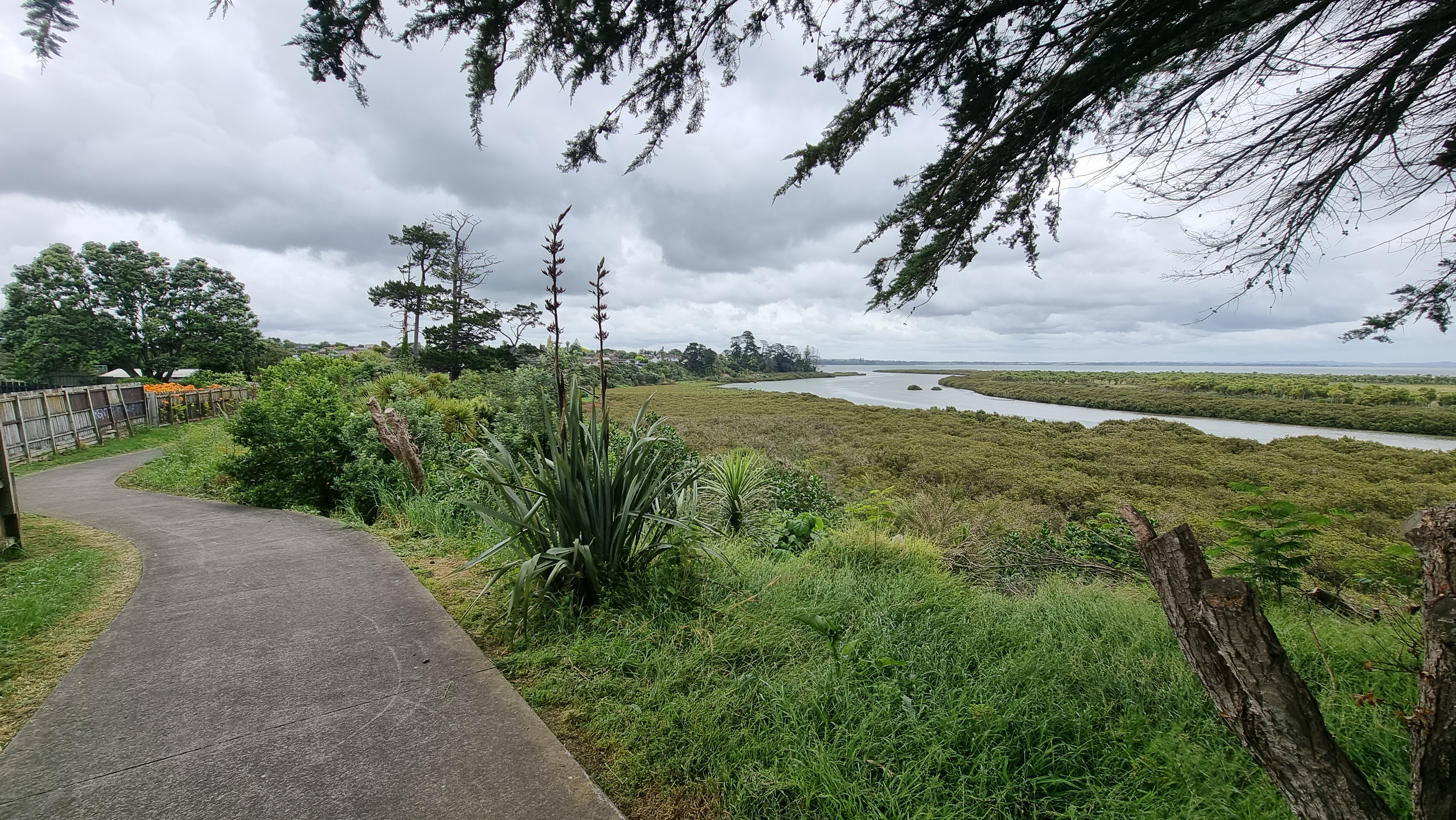
- Clendon Park Reserve Park
- Interactive map of Clendon Park
- Coordinates: 37.0323°S 174.8693°E
- Country: New Zealand
- City: Auckland
- Local authority: Auckland Council
- Electoral ward: Manurewa-Papakura ward
- Local board: Manurewa Local Board

Area
  - Land: 181 ha (450 acres)

Population (June 2025)
  - Total: 9,150
  - Density: 5,060/km^{2} (13,100/sq mi)

Airport Oaks	Wiri	Homai
Manukau harbour	Clendon Park	Manurewa
Manukau Harbour	Weymouth	Wattle Downs, Takanini

Clendon Park, also known as "Clendon", is a suburb of Auckland in northern New Zealand. It is located to the west of Manurewa and South of Wiri, and North of Weymouth, New Zealand. The suburb is in the Manurewa-Papakura ward, one of the 21 local boards of Auckland Council.

Clendon Park is connected to the Auckland Southwestern Motorway via Roscommon Road, an arterial route which cuts across the suburb's northeastern corner.

== History ==
In the 1830s William Fairburn, a missionary with the Church Missionary Society, claimed to have purchased most of South Auckland (83,000 acres, stretching from Papatoetoe to Papakura) from māori. After the treaty signing in 1840, the purchase was examined by the newly formed Colony of New Zealand. Fairburn was allowed to keep a seventh of the land, with the Crown keeping the "surplus lands".

Clendon Park is named after Captain James Reddy Clendon who in 1840 traded land he owned in the Bay of Islands with the Crown for 10,000 acres (40 km^{2}) of the 'surplus lands', including Clendon Park. Clendon never lived in or visited the area.

The name Clendon Park was chosen in October 1976 by the Manukau City Council.

Clendon Park's first stage of development was at Finlayson Avenue, where the Clendon Park Community House opened in April 1979. The first stage of the Clendon Park Shopping Centre opened in 1984. The development later expanded south to Weymouth.

== Demographics ==
Clendon Park covers 1.81 km^{2} (0.70 sq mi) and had an estimated population of 9,150 as of June 2025, with a population density of 5,055 people per km^{2}.

Historical population
Year	Pop.	±% p.a.
2006	7,965	—
2013	7,791	−0.32%
2018	8,874	+2.64%
2023	8,463	−0.94%

Clendon Park had a population of 8,463 in the 2023 New Zealand census, a decrease of 411 people (−4.6%) since the 2018 census, and an increase of 672 people (8.6%) since the 2013 census. There were 4,233 males, 4,209 females and 15 people of other genders in 2,040 dwellings. 2.1% of people identified as LGBTIQ+. The median age was 27.7 years (compared with 38.1 years nationally). There were 2,340 people (27.6%) aged under 15 years, 2,202 (26.0%) aged 15 to 29, 3,399 (40.2%) aged 30 to 64, and 519 (6.1%) aged 65 or older.

People could identify as more than one ethnicity. The results were 15.3% European (Pākehā); 29.2% Māori; 54.7% Pasifika; 19.5% Asian; 1.0% Middle Eastern, Latin American and African New Zealanders (MELAA); and 0.5% other, which includes people giving their ethnicity as "New Zealander". English was spoken by 91.0%, Māori language by 8.7%, Samoan by 20.7%, and other languages by 20.6%. No language could be spoken by 3.0% (e.g. too young to talk). New Zealand Sign Language was known by 0.3%. The percentage of people born overseas was 36.4, compared with 28.8% nationally.

Religious affiliations were 49.6% Christian, 7.6% Hindu, 3.5% Islam, 3.4% Māori religious beliefs, 0.7% Buddhist, 0.1% New Age, and 1.9% other religions. People who answered that they had no religion were 26.3%, and 7.1% of people did not answer the census question.

Of those at least 15 years old, 609 (9.9%) people had a bachelor's or higher degree, 2,979 (48.7%) had a post-high school certificate or diploma, and 2,532 (41.4%) people exclusively held high school qualifications. The median income was $35,200, compared with $41,500 nationally. 201 people (3.3%) earned over $100,000 compared to 12.1% nationally. The employment status of those at least 15 was that 2,982 (48.7%) people were employed full-time, 486 (7.9%) were part-time, and 384 (6.3%) were unemployed.

Individual statistical areas
Name	Area (km^{2})	Population	Density (per km^{2})	Dwellings	Median age	Median income
Clendon Park North	0.75	3,117	4,156	750	27.8 years	$35,800
Clendon Park West	0.59	3,132	5,308	747	28.6 years	$35,800
Clendon Park East	0.46	2,214	4,813	540	26.4 years	$32,800
New Zealand					38.1 years	$41,500

== Education ==
Waimahia Intermediate School is an intermediate school (years 7–8), with a roll of 238.

Clendon Park School, Te Matauranga and Roscommon School are contributing primary schools (years 1–6), with rolls of 734, 312 and 542 students, respectively. Clendon Park School opened in 1971. Te Matauranga has some Samoan classes up to year 8.

Te Kura Kaupapa Māori o Manurewa is a full primary school (years 1–8), with a roll of 139.

All these schools are coeducational. Te Kura Kaupapa Māori o Manurewa teaches primarily in the Māori language. All other schools here include classes in Māori and Samoan languages. Rolls are as of July 2026.

== Amenities ==
Te Matariki Clendon Community Centre and Library Clendon Shopping Centre Finlayson Avenue Reserve Laurie Gibbons Memorial Park

== See also ==
- Manurewa High School
