= Pahurehure Inlet =

Inlet of the Manukau Harbour in the Auckland Region

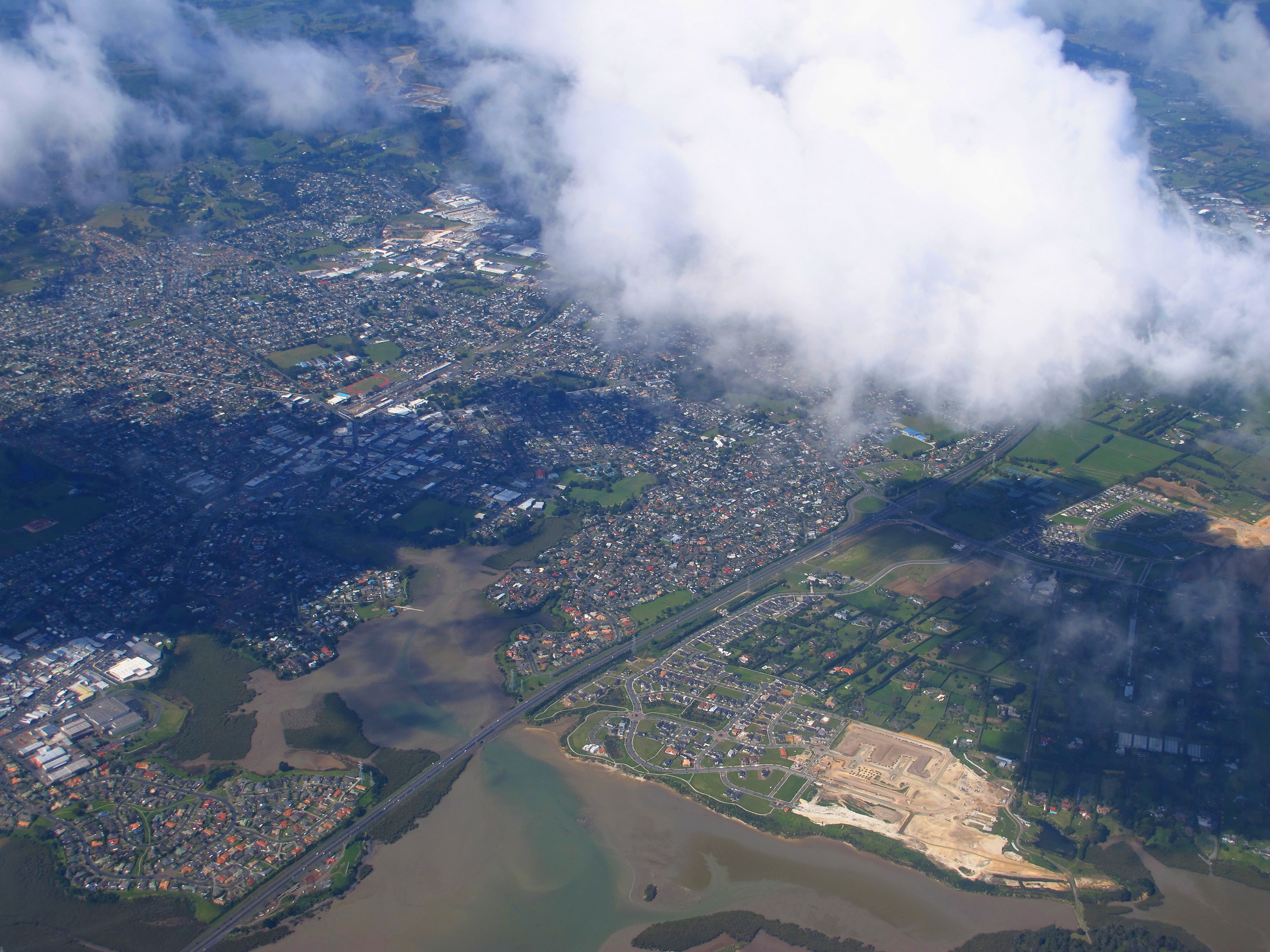
- Aerial view of the Pahurehure Inlet

- Location within Auckland
- Coordinates: 37.062598°S 174.886261°E
- Part of: Manukau Harbour
- River sources: Drury Creek, Hingaia Stream, Ngakoroa Stream, Oira Creek, Otūwairoa Stream, Papakura Stream, Waihoehoe Stream, Waimahia Creek, Waipokapū Stream, Whangamaire Stream, Whangapouri Creek
- Primary outflows: Papakura Channel
- Islands: Kopuahingahinga Island, Pararekau Island, Shark Island

The Pahurehure Inlet is an inlet of the Manukau Harbour of the Auckland Region of New Zealand's North Island. It is one of the three major inlets of the Manukau Harbour, alongside the Māngere Inlet and Waiuku Inlet.

== Geography ==
The Pahurehure Inlet is found in the southeast of the Manukau Harbour. It borders the suburbs of Weymouth, Wattle Downs, Waiata Shores, Conifer Grove, Papakura, Pahurehure, Karaka, Hingaia, Drury, Park Green and Auranga.

Major subsections of the inlet include the Waimahia Creek, Drury Creek and Whangamaire Creek. Many major waterways of South Auckland and northern Franklin empty into the Pahurehure Inlet, including the Papakura Stream, Hingaia Stream, Ngakoroa Stream, Otūwairoa Stream and Waipokapū Stream. The inlet has one large island called Pararekau Island.

== Biodiversity ==
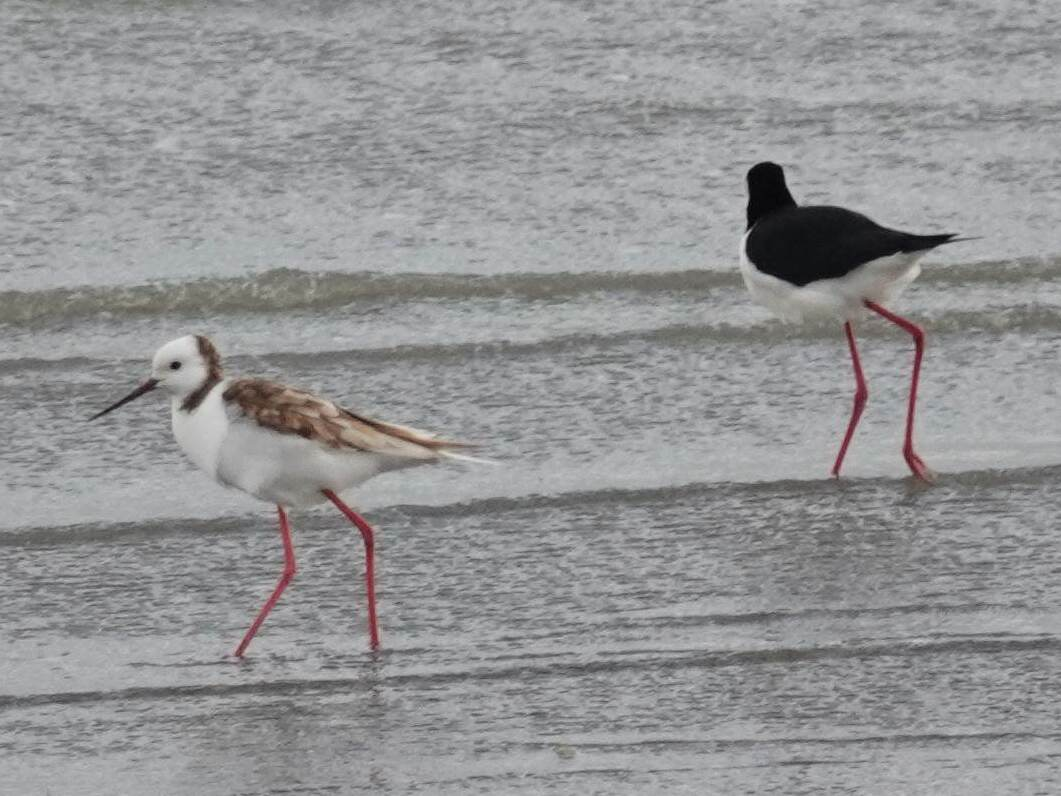
Pied stilts in the Pahurehure Inlet near Wattle Downs

The inlet is home to many bird species, including the pied stilt, royal spoonbill, white-faced heron and banded rail.

== History ==
The traditional Tāmaki Māori name for the inlet is Taawhati o Ngaa Tai "The Place of the Ebbing Tide", also shortened to Otaawhati. The area is culturally significant to Waiohua iwi, including Ngāti Tamaoho, Ngāti Te Ata Waiohua, Te Ākitai Waiohua, and to Ngāi Tai ki Tāmaki. The inlet was an important corridor for trade, transport and communication, and Waiohua iwi operated seasonal fishing kāinga on the islands of the inlet.

In 1963, two tidal arms were separated from the Pahurehure Inlet when the Auckland Southern Motorway was constructed. This led to sediment build-up, and these tidal arms being colonised by mangroves.

== Amenities ==
The Papakura section of the inlet has a public walkway, between Ray Small Park and Youngs Beach Reserve.
