= Kōpuahingahinga Island =

Island in Auckland, New Zealand

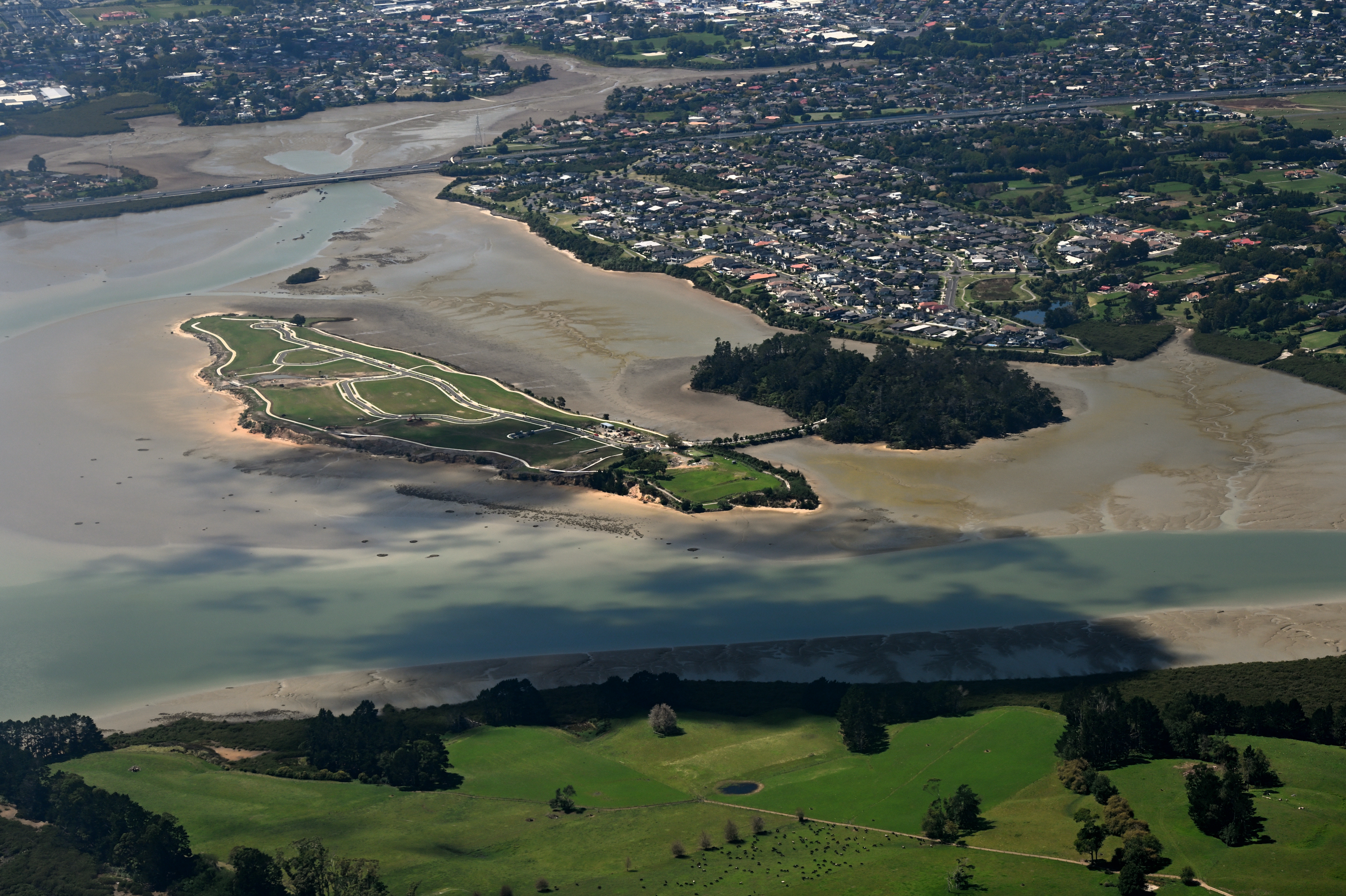
- Aerial view of Kōpuahingahinga Island between Pararekau Island and the mainland
- Interactive map of Kōpuahingahinga Island

Geography
- Location: Auckland
- Coordinates: 37°04′00″S 174°54′30″E
- Adjacent to: Pahurehure Inlet, Manukau Harbour
- Area: 8.0 ha (20 acres)
- Length: 400 m (1300 ft)
- Width: 250 m (820 ft)

Administration
- New Zealand
- Region: Auckland City

Kōpuahingahinga Island is an island within the Pahurehure Inlet of the Manukau Harbour in Auckland, New Zealand. Kōpuahingahinga and Pararekau Island, are together known as the Hingaia Islands. It covers an area of 8.0 hectares (20 acres), and is near the Drury Creek. It is privately owned, and connected to the mainland and to neighbouring Parerēkau Island by causeways.

== History ==
In 2001 or 2002, the island was bought by the Karaka Harbourside Estate. In 2015, it was reported that Chinese investors purchased Kōpuahingahinga Island alongside Pararekau Island for $41.5 million with plans for turning the islands into a luxury resort and a native reserve. There have been local efforts to stop it from being developed.

== Flora ==
A botanical survey was held on the island in 2010, finding 100 vascular plants. The island contains Pinus radiata, Myrsine australis, Cyathea dealbata, Geniostoma ligustrifolium, Leptecophylla juniperina, Coprosma lucida, kānuka, mānuka, dwarf mistletoe, Epacris pauciflora. It has a few small areas of salt marsh, containing the plants Juncus kraussii, Baumea juncea and Apodasmia similis.

The island has been described as having a relatively low level of weeds, including pampas grass, gorse, Asparagus asparagoides and Japanese honeysuckle. There are many weeds alongside the roadside, which have either been planted there or dumped. These weeds include Agapanthus praecox, Jasminum polyanthum, periwinkle, and Mauritius hemp.
