= Clendon Park School =

School in Auckland Region, New Zealand

Location
- 145 Rowandale Avenue, Manurewa, Auckland, New Zealand; 37.0177°S 174.8712°E

Information
- Type: State co-educational contributing (year 1-8)
- Ministry of Education Institution no.: 1248
- Principal: Sue Dawson
- Enrolment: 734 (July 2026)
- Socio-economic decile: 1
- Website: clendonpark.school.nz

Clendon Park School is a primary school (Years 1–8) in Manurewa, a suburb of Manukau City, Auckland Region, New Zealand.

Clendon Park has two bilingual units (Years 1–8). A Maori bilingual unit (Te Whanau Awhina) was established in 2000 and it currently consists of seven classes. The students in this unit often achieve above the national norms. A Samoan bilingual unit (Tautua Mo Tupulaga) began in 2006 and it currently comprises five classes.

== See also ==
- Clendon Park
