= Pararekau Island =

Island in Auckland, New Zealand

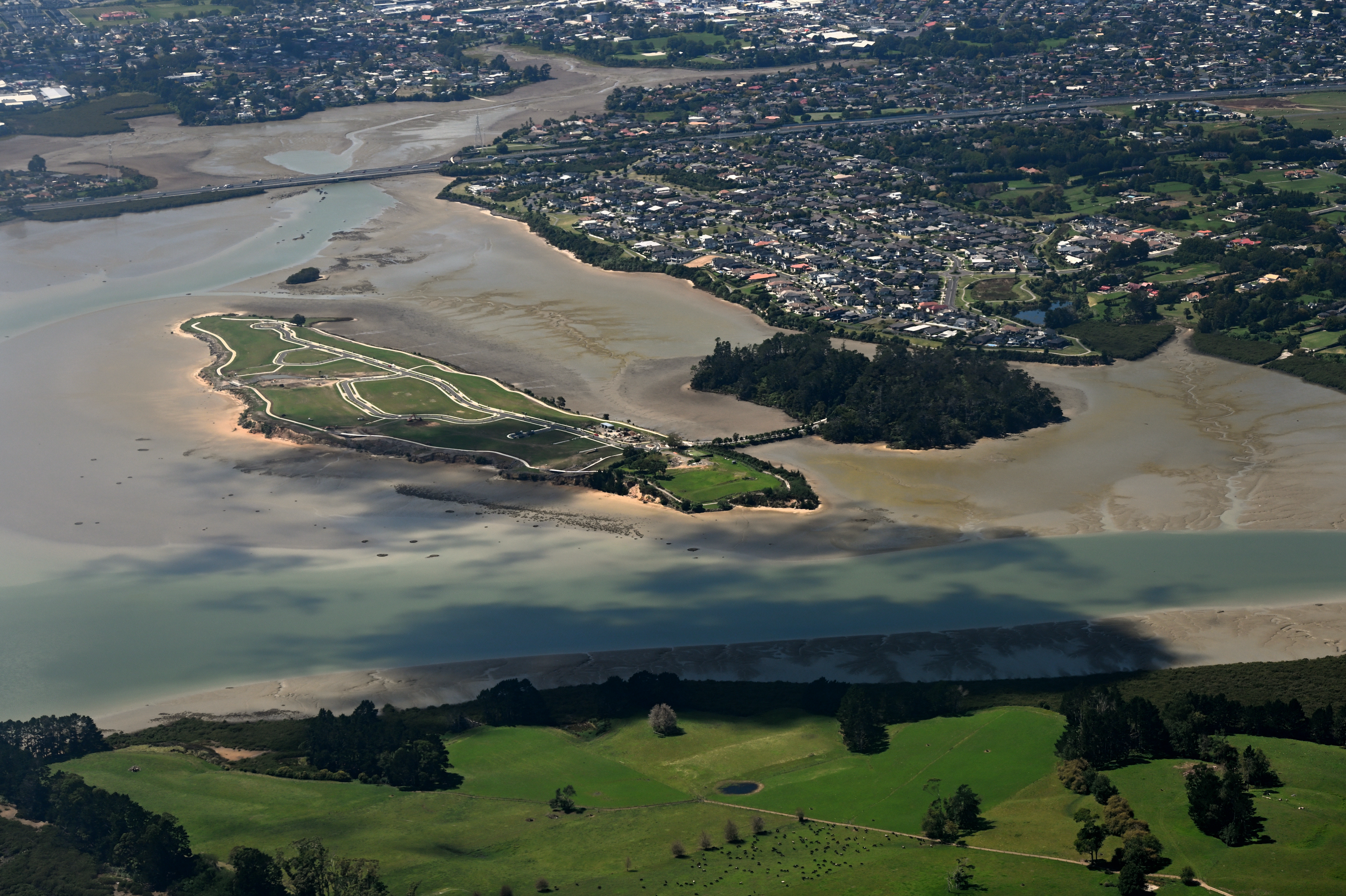
- The long finger of Pararekau Island and darker form of Kōpuahingahinga Island in Manukau Harbour
- Interactive map of Pararekau Island

Geography
- Location: Auckland
- Coordinates: 37°03′45″S 174°54′30″E
- Adjacent to: Pahurehure Inlet, Manukau Harbour
- Area: 20.0 ha (49 acres)
- Length: 1,100 m (3600 ft)
- Width: 280 m (920 ft)

Administration
- New Zealand

Pararekau Island is an island situated within the Pahurehure Inlet of the Manukau Harbour in Auckland, New Zealand. Pararekau and Kōpuahingahinga Island are together known as the Hingaia Islands. It is connected to the mainland by a causeway which runs across Kōpuahingahinga Island. At around 20 hectares (49 acres) in size, it is the third largest island in the Manukau Harbour after Puketutu and Te Wiroa Islands to the north of it. A large mudflat lies around edge of the island, extending towards Karaka Harbourside to the south.

== History ==
For most of its late history, the island was a farm estate until 2022, where development started on a 103-lot exclusive subdivision. The developers were Ian and Jim Ross, who also developed the adjacent Karaka Harbourside Estate across the causeway.

Construction started on the island after being approved in September 2022, The plans included an automatic gate that recognises number plates of residents, and a residents society to manage assets on the island, with rules in place that meant residents will not be allowed to have weeds above 15cm, and will not be allowed to have clothes lines visible on the road. Originally it was going to be developed into a retirement home, but it was decided to be subdivided. There have been local efforts to stop the island from being developed, but they ultimately failed.

A coastal walkway around the perimeter of the island was approved alongside its development, with a wider esplanade reserve to mitigate erosion effects. All assets would be funded and maintained by the Auckland Council.
