= Te Mahia railway station =

Railway station in New Zealand

Te Mahia
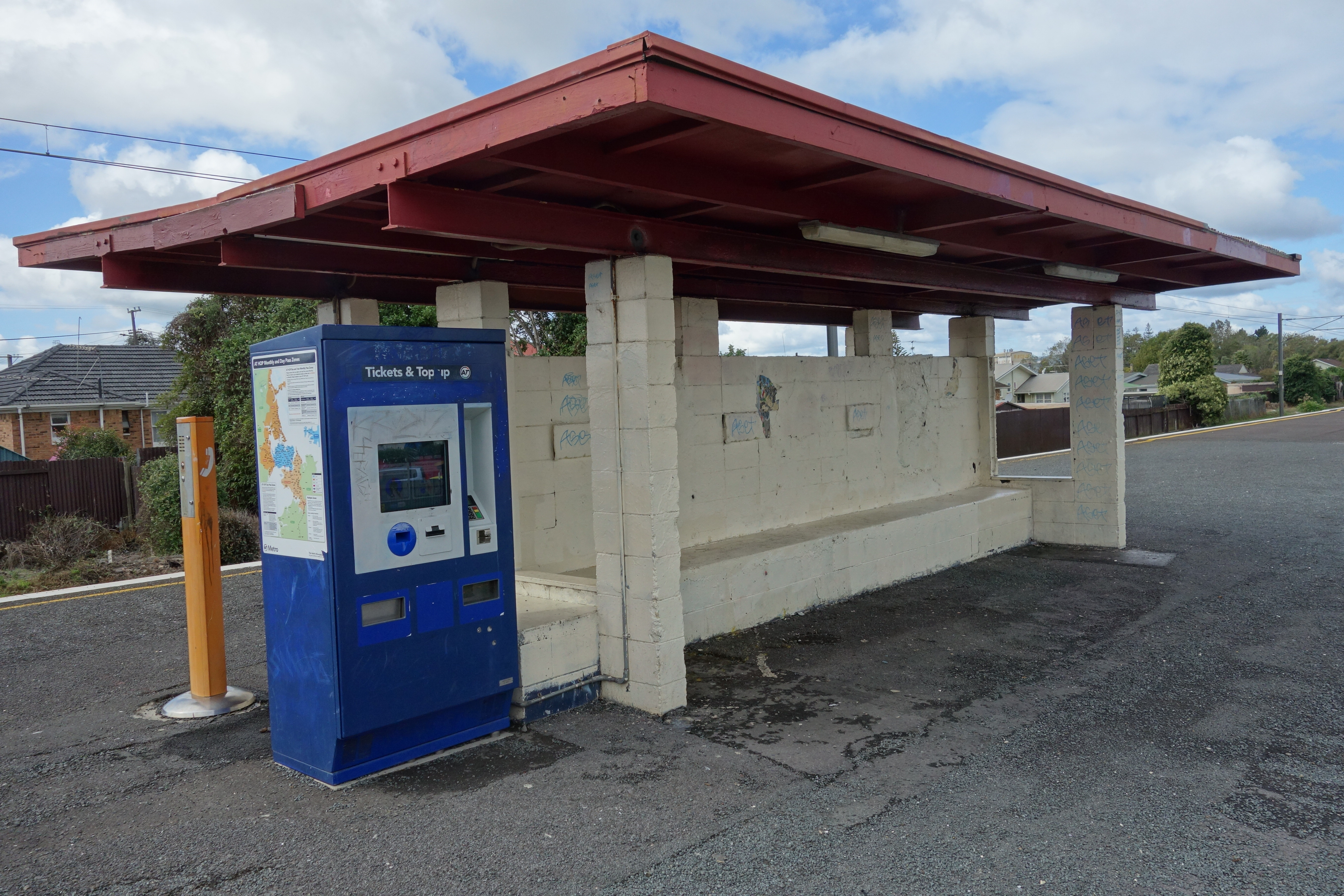
- The shelter at Te Mahia station prior to the station's upgrade

General information
- Location: Manurewa, Auckland; New Zealand
- Coordinates: 37.0312°S 174.9061°E
- System: Auckland Transport Urban rail
- Owner: KiwiRail (track and platforms); Auckland Transport (buildings)
- Operator: Auckland One Rail
- Line: North Island Main Trunk
- Distance: 652.24 km (405.28 mi) from Wellington
- Platforms: Island platform (P1 & P2)
- Tracks: Mainline (2)

Construction
- Parking: No
- Cycle facilities: No
- Accessible: Yes

Other information
- Fare zone: Southern Manukau

History
- Opened: 16 August 1926

Passengers
- 2013: 376 passengers/weekday

Services
| Preceding station | Auckland Transport (Auckland One Rail) | Following station |
|---|---|---|
| Takaanini towards Pukekohe | South City Line | Manurewa towards Newmarket |
Location

Te Mahia railway station is on the South City line of the Auckland railway network in New Zealand. It has an island platform layout and is reached by stairs and lifts.

There have been proposals to relocate this station approximately 200 metres (660 ft) north to a more visible location next to the Great South Road, near the overbridge. In 2013, it was instead discussed that Auckland Transport would potentially close the station, as patronage numbers had not improved significantly. About 1,000 locals opposed the closure option in a petition, and noted that a new residential subdivision was to start construction in the area. Auckland Transport however noted that the planned houses were generally too far away from the station for potential passengers to walk to it.

== History ==
The railway through Manurewa was opened on 20 May 1875, as part of the Auckland and Mercer Railway, built by Brogden & Co, who extended it from Penrose.

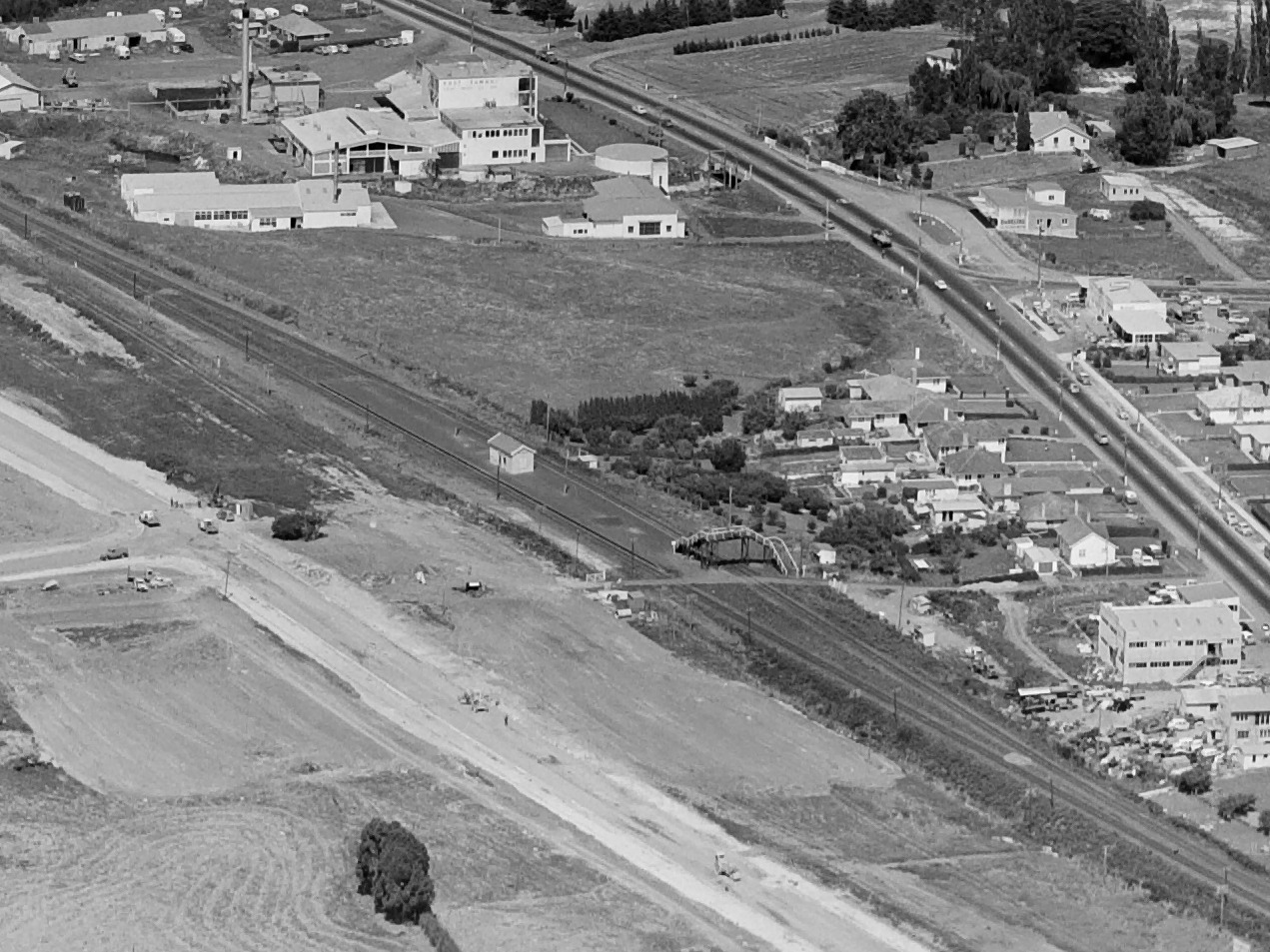
Aerial photograph of Te Mahia Railway Station in 1963

The station was opened on 16 August 1926. The station was opened due to the population growth in south Manurewa.

In 1935, after complaints about the inadequacy of the single oil lamp at the station, three electric lights were installed - one at each end of the platform, and one at the entrance.

It was renamed from Mahia to Te Mahia from 9 February 1951 by a decision of the New Zealand Geographic Board.

In 2013, Auckland Transport proposed to close the station due to low patronage. It suffered from rampant vandalism and passengers complained of feeling unsafe.

A multimillion-dollar upgrade to improve access, lighting, security and shelter began in August 2018. As part of this upgrade the old cinder-block construction platform shelters were replaced.

A piece of land adjacent to the Great South Rd station entrance was bought in 2018, with plans to open the station entrance up and increase visibility, making it safer for the public and commuters. Investigation and design began at the end of 2021. Upgrades to the entrance commenced in July 2023; with a new wider walkway, new planted areas, fencing improvements, enhanced street lighting, and CCTV improvements. A pedestrian crossing with traffic lights was installed outside the entrance to further improve access.

In September 2025, as part of the Level Crossing Removal Programme, work began to remove the pedestrian level crossing, replacing it with a pedestrian bridge and 3 lifts. The project was completed in August 2026.

== Services ==
Auckland One Rail, on behalf of Auckland Transport, operates South City line services to Newmarket and Pukekohe.

Te Mahia station is served by bus routes 33 and 364.

== See also ==
- List of Auckland railway stations
