= Conifer Grove =

- Suburb
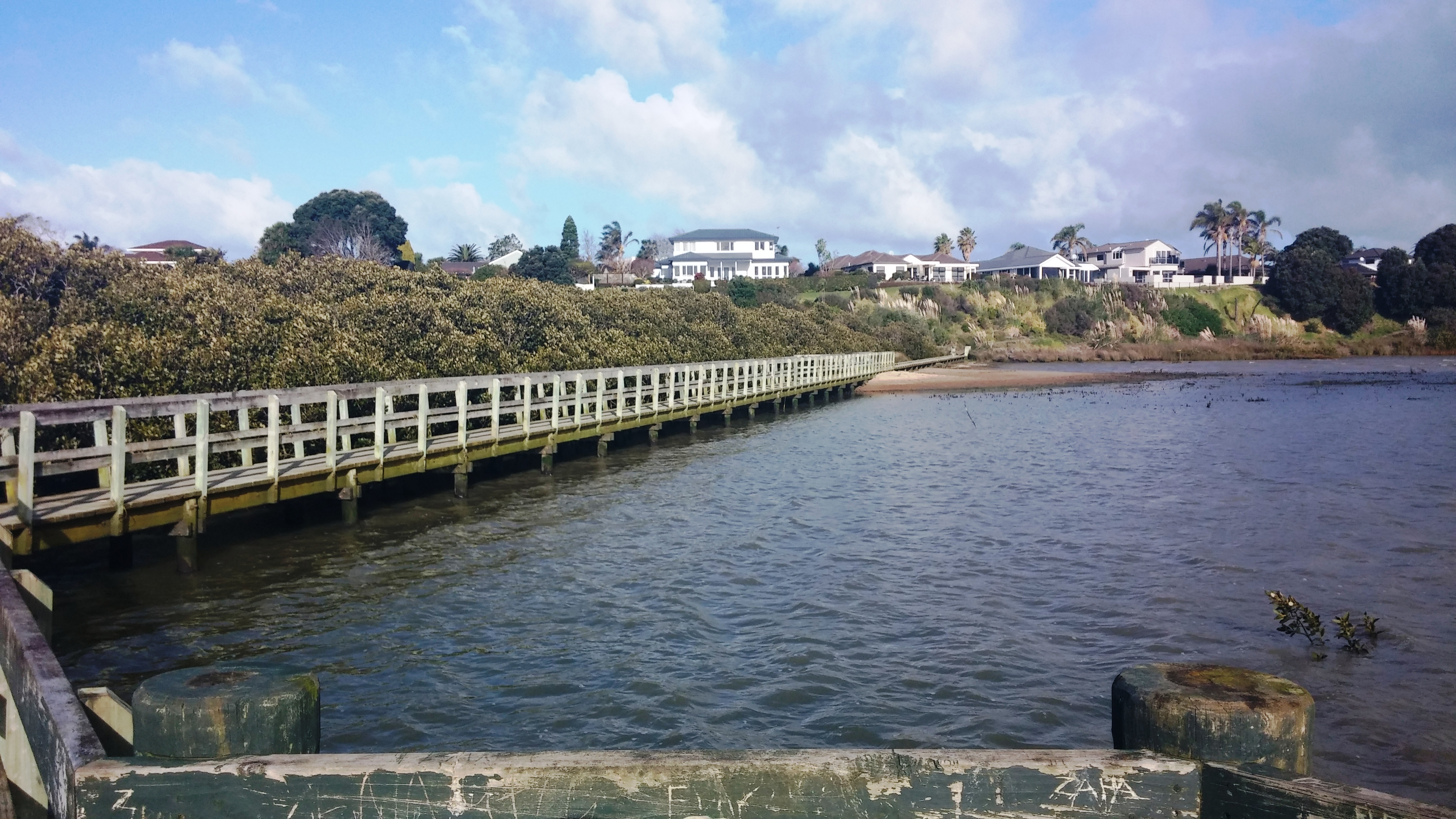
- A coastal boardwalk along the Pahurehure Inlet at Conifer Grove
- Interactive map of Conifer Grove
- Coordinates: 37.0501°S 174.9112°E
- Country: New Zealand
- City: Auckland
- Local authority: Auckland Council
- Electoral ward: Manurewa-Papakura ward
- Local board: Papakura Local Board
- Established: 1960

Area
  - Land: 225 ha (560 acres)

Population (June 2025)
  - Total: 6,740
  - Density: 3,000/km^{2} (7,760/sq mi)

Wattle Downs	Manurewa	Takanini
(Pahurehure Inlet)	Conifer Grove	Takanini
(Pahurehure Inlet)	(Pahurehure Inlet)	Papakura

Conifer Grove is a suburb of Auckland, in northern New Zealand. Located on the eastern shores of the Pahurehure Inlet, on the Manukau Harbour, under authority of the Auckland Council. Established in 1974 at the former site of a farm, the suburb makes up the western side of the Takanini urban area and is in the Manurewa-Papakura ward of Auckland. It includes the Waiata Shores subdivision developed by Fletcher Living in 2018, at the site of the former Manukau Golf Course.

== Geography ==
Conifer Grove is located on a peninsula of land adjacent to the Pahurehure Inlet, bordered by the Great South Road to the east. The name was chosen to reflect the environmental focus of the area, as approximately 1/5th of the area was set aside as nature reserves when the suburb was being established.

Most of the streets are cul-de-sacs. Due to the suburbs design pattern, there was only one way in and out of the more recent area of Conifer Grove until 2021, when Brylee Drive was linked to Gosper Road of the adjacent Waiata Shores development. The Walter Strevens Drive roundabout also has a security camera which records vehicle movement in and out of the area. The suburb is known for its tree-lined streets, bay views, and until 2018 its border with the Manukau Golf Course.

== History ==
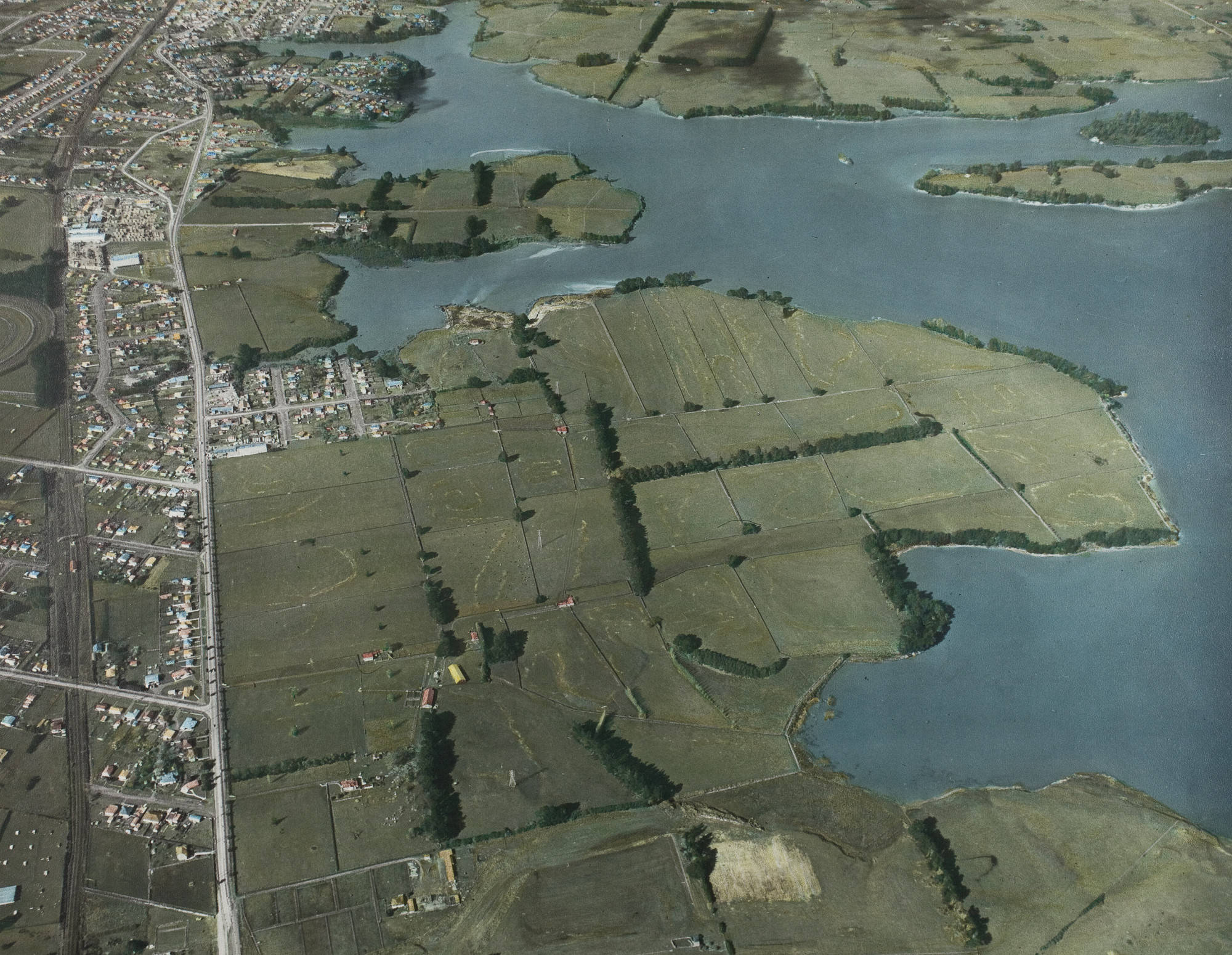
Aerial view of the Streven family farm in 1962, prior to the development of Conifer Grove

During much of the early 20th century, the area was the location of the Streven family farm. The farm, previously Manukau Golf Course, is now the Waiata Shores subdivision. The names Walter Strevens Drive and Walter Strevens reserve come from the name of the patriarch of that family at the time it was sold - Walter John Strevens. In January 1974, 1,000 acres (400 ha) of the farm was developed into suburban housing, developed as an upmarket "environmental subdivision". Fraser Thomas were commissioned to design the subdivision and to manage its construction. Fraser Thomas were awarded Certificates of Merit by both the Association of Consulting Engineers NZ and the New Zealand Institute of Surveyors.

In 1981, Conifer Grove School was opened, followed by the Conifer Grove shopping centre in 1985.

In 2018, the first houses of Fletcher Living's Waiata Shores housing development at the former site of the Manukau Golf Course were made available to purchase.

== Demographics ==
Conifer Grove covers 2.25 km^{2} (0.87 sq mi) and had an estimated population of 6,740 as of June 2025, with a population density of 2,996 people per km^{2}.

Historical population
Year	Pop.	±% p.a.
2006	4,572	—
2013	4,620	+0.15%
2018	4,713	+0.40%
2023	5,907	+4.62%

Conifer Grove had a population of 5,907 in the 2023 New Zealand census, an increase of 1,194 people (25.3%) since the 2018 census, and an increase of 1,287 people (27.9%) since the 2013 census. There were 2,925 males, 2,970 females and 12 people of other genders in 1,947 dwellings. 2.5% of people identified as LGBTIQ+. The median age was 35.6 years (compared with 38.1 years nationally). There were 1,176 people (19.9%) aged under 15 years, 1,104 (18.7%) aged 15 to 29, 2,847 (48.2%) aged 30 to 64, and 780 (13.2%) aged 65 or older.

People could identify as more than one ethnicity. The results were 47.7% European (Pākehā); 18.7% Māori; 16.4% Pasifika; 31.9% Asian; 1.5% Middle Eastern, Latin American and African New Zealanders (MELAA); and 2.2% other, which includes people giving their ethnicity as "New Zealander". English was spoken by 91.4%, Māori language by 3.7%, Samoan by 5.3%, and other languages by 25.5%. No language could be spoken by 2.7% (e.g. too young to talk). New Zealand Sign Language was known by 0.8%. The percentage of people born overseas was 35.7, compared with 28.8% nationally.

Religious affiliations were 34.3% Christian, 7.3% Hindu, 1.9% Islam, 1.5% Māori religious beliefs, 1.8% Buddhist, 0.4% New Age, 0.1% Jewish, and 9.6% other religions. People who answered that they had no religion were 38.1%, and 5.4% of people did not answer the census question.

Of those at least 15 years old, 1,248 (26.4%) people had a bachelor's or higher degree, 2,217 (46.9%) had a post-high school certificate or diploma, and 1,269 (26.8%) people exclusively held high school qualifications. The median income was $49,700, compared with $41,500 nationally. 639 people (13.5%) earned over $100,000 compared to 12.1% nationally. The employment status of those at least 15 was that 2,715 (57.4%) people were employed full-time, 462 (9.8%) were part-time, and 153 (3.2%) were unemployed.

Individual statistical areas
Name	Area (km^{2})	Population	Density (per km^{2})	Dwellings	Median age	Median income
Conifer Grove West	1.59	3,606	2,268	1,161	38.1 years	$56,000
Conifer Grove East	0.65	2,301	3,540	786	32.4 years	$40,400
New Zealand					38.1 years	$41,500

== Facilities ==
The older Conifer Grove precinct has a small shopping centre, however in the newly established Waiata Shores centre, it includes a Countdown supermarket and in the future will include more retail and office space.

There are various parks/reserves such as Brylee Drive Reserve with two tennis courts and playground. This links to a board walk which goes around the waters/mangroves edge, which is enjoyed by many of the residents. This walk has been extended to connect the boardwalk through to Walter Strevens Drive reserve.

St. Aidan's Presbyterian Church was the first church constructed in the suburb in 1989.

== Education ==
Conifer Grove School is a coeducational full primary school (years 1–8) with a roll of 540 as of July 2026. It is zoned primarily for Rosehill College.

== Local government ==
Conifer Grove was originally a part of the Manurewa Ward of Manukau City when the suburb was first established in the 1970s. In the local government reforms of 1989, the suburb was shifted from Manukau City to Papakura District. In November 2010, all cities and districts of the Auckland Region were amalgamated into a single body, governed by the Auckland Council. Conifer Grove is a part of the Papakura local board area. The residents of Conifer Grove elect a local board, and two councillors from the Manurewa-Papakura ward to sit on the Auckland Council.
