= Takanini =

- Suburb
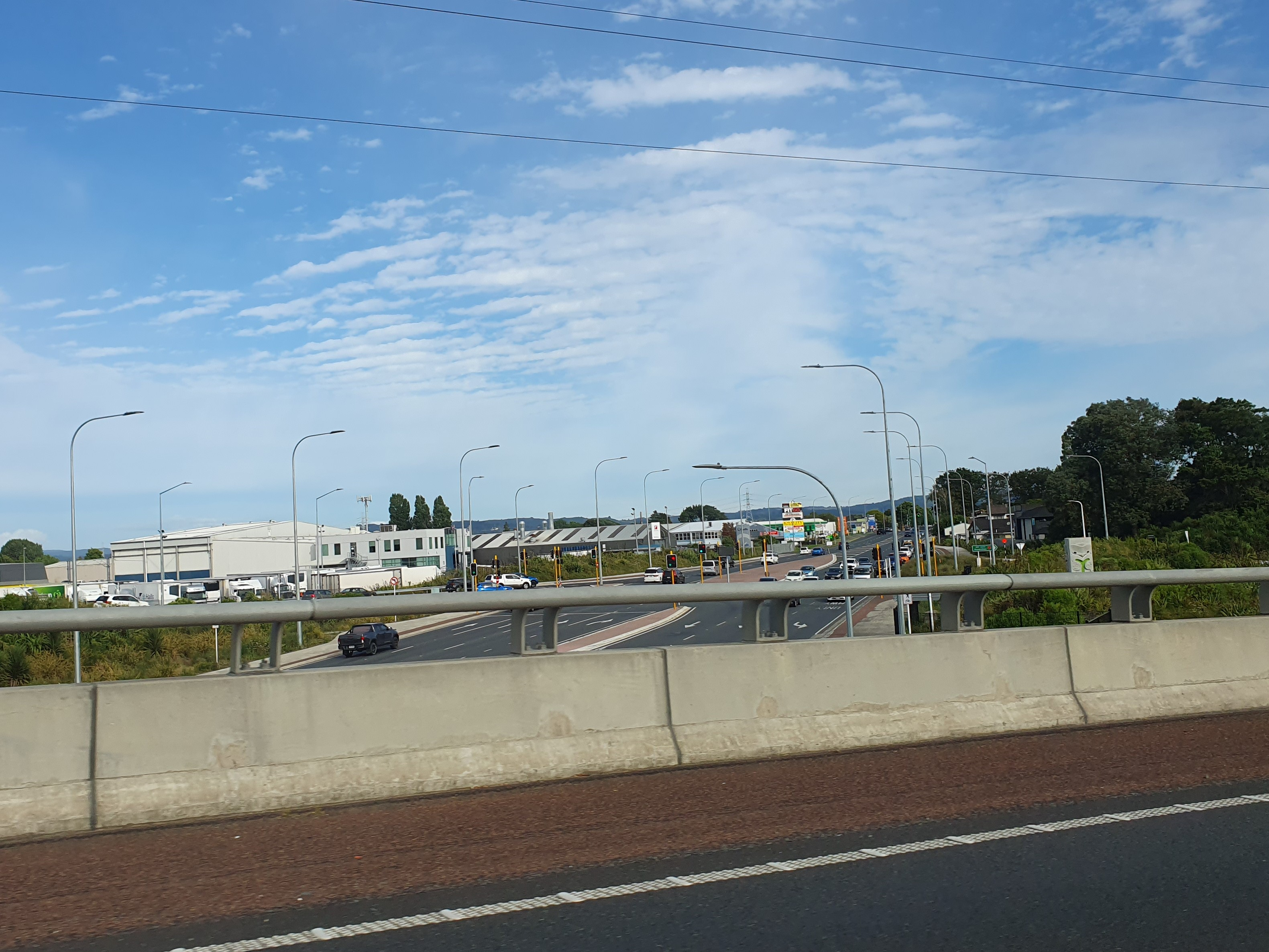
- Takanini seen from the Auckland Southern Motorway
- Interactive map of Takanini
- Coordinates: 37.0429°S 174.9189°E
- Country: New Zealand
- City: Auckland
- Local authority: Auckland Council
- Electoral ward: Manurewa-Papakura ward
- Local board: Papakura Local Board

Area
  - Land: 1,026 ha (2,540 acres)

Population (June 2025)
  - Total: 17,350
  - Density: 1,691/km^{2} (4,380/sq mi)
- Train stations: Takaanini railway station
- Hospitals: Takanini Care

Wattle Downs, Clendon,	Manurewa	Alfriston
Conifer Grove	Takanini	Ardmore
(Towards Manukau Harbour)	Papakura	Papakura North

Takanini is a southern suburb of Auckland, New Zealand. It is located on the shores of the Pahurehure Inlet, 28 kilometres southeast of the Auckland CBD.

The suburb is home to a Fonterra milk plant, the Addison housing development, as well as international horse breeding facilities throughout the area. The two major shopping centres in Takanini are Takanini Town Centre and Southgate Shopping Centre.

== History ==
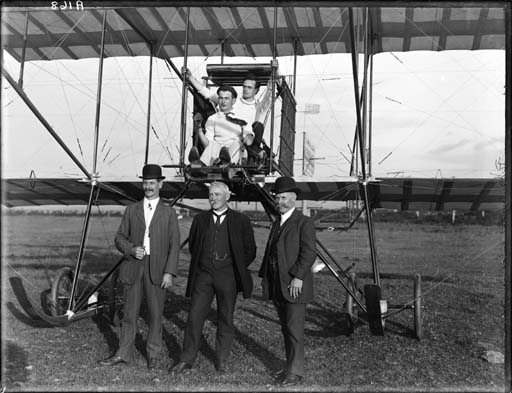
Leo and Vivian Walsh with the Manurewa at Glenora Park, Takanini in 1911

The suburb is named after Ihaka Takaanini, a 19th-century Māori chief of the area.

An old highway, the Great South Road, runs through Takanini, forming its main street. The road was constructed during the New Zealand Wars to transport supplies to the Waikato campaign. It was guarded by armed constabulary and was a designated military road.

The first successful aeroplane flights in New Zealand were made in Takanini in February 1911, when Vivian Walsh and his brother Leo flew a Howard Wright 1910 Biplane named the Manurewa at Glenora Park (an area near the modern-day Southgate Shopping Centre).

During the major reformation of local government in 1989, Takanini was included into the Papakura District boundaries.

From October 2010, after a review of the Royal Commission on Auckland Governance, the entire Auckland Region was amalgamated into a single city authority. As well as Papakura District, other territorial authorities such as North Shore City, Rodney District, Waitakere City, Auckland City, Manukau City and the Franklin District were abolished and the entire area amalgamated into a single Auckland city council. The suburb of Takanini is now in the Manurewa-Papakura Ward of the Auckland Council.

== Demographics ==
Takanini covers 10.26 km^{2} (3.96 sq mi) and had an estimated population of 17,350 as of June 2025, with a population density of 1,691 people per km^{2}.

Historical population
Year	Pop.	±% p.a.
2006	6,459	—
2013	7,077	+1.31%
2018	10,845	+8.91%
2023	14,436	+5.89%
The 2006 population is for a larger area of 11.72 km^{2}. Source:

Takanini had a population of 14,436 in the 2023 New Zealand census, an increase of 3,591 people (33.1%) since the 2018 census, and an increase of 7,359 people (104.0%) since the 2013 census. There were 7,410 males, 6,996 females and 30 people of other genders in 4,098 dwellings. 2.0% of people identified as LGBTIQ+. The median age was 31.9 years (compared with 38.1 years nationally). There were 3,279 people (22.7%) aged under 15 years, 3,165 (21.9%) aged 15 to 29, 6,828 (47.3%) aged 30 to 64, and 1,161 (8.0%) aged 65 or older.

People could identify as more than one ethnicity. The results were 22.2% European (Pākehā); 16.1% Māori; 18.1% Pasifika; 54.7% Asian; 1.7% Middle Eastern, Latin American and African New Zealanders (MELAA); and 1.3% other, which includes people giving their ethnicity as "New Zealander". English was spoken by 86.7%, Māori language by 3.7%, Samoan by 5.0%, and other languages by 40.9%. No language could be spoken by 3.7% (e.g. too young to talk). New Zealand Sign Language was known by 0.5%. The percentage of people born overseas was 51.6, compared with 28.8% nationally.

Religious affiliations were 31.1% Christian, 12.9% Hindu, 3.4% Islam, 1.4% Māori religious beliefs, 2.2% Buddhist, 0.1% New Age, and 20.1% other religions. People who answered that they had no religion were 24.0%, and 4.8% of people did not answer the census question.

Of those at least 15 years old, 3,009 (27.0%) people had a bachelor's or higher degree, 4,425 (39.7%) had a post-high school certificate or diploma, and 3,714 (33.3%) people exclusively held high school qualifications. The median income was $45,500, compared with $41,500 nationally. 912 people (8.2%) earned over $100,000 compared to 12.1% nationally. The employment status of those at least 15 was that 6,402 (57.4%) people were employed full-time, 915 (8.2%) were part-time, and 426 (3.8%) were unemployed.

Takanini comprises six statistical areas: Takanini North, which is rural; Takanini Central, which is mostly commercial; Takanini Industrial; and three predominantly residential areas.

Individual statistical areas
Name	Area (km^{2})	Population	Density (per km^{2})	Dwellings	Median age	Median income
Takanini North	5.28	2,589	490	750	31.5 years	$40,200
Takanini Industrial	0.88	27	31	6	39.6 years	$30,800
Takanini West	0.69	2,907	4,213	819	31.6 years	$35,100
Takanini South	0.70	4,242	6,060	1,176	31.6 years	$51,700
Takanini East	1.62	3,561	2,198	963	31.1 years	$54,100
Takanini Central	1.09	1,110	1,018	387	50.6 years	$34,800
New Zealand					38.1 years	$41,500

== Education ==
Takanini School and Kauri Flats School are full primary schools (years 1–8) with rolls of 586 and 703 students, respectively. Kauri Flats school opened in 2017.

Holy Trinity Catholic Primary School is a state-integrated contributing primary school (years 1–6) with a roll of 302.

All these schools are coeducational. Rolls are as of July 2026.

== Facilities ==
=== Housing ===
Similar to Dannemora, and Howick, Takanini has several suburban styled housing complexes throughout the area. Addison, Longford Park, and McLennan are three of the major housing projects which have increased local property values; smaller projects include Waiata Shores, Kauri Flats and Kauri Landing. The Takanini area contains a highly ethnically diverse population. A major Kiwibuild building project is being realised on surplus Defence Force land, east of Great South Road. The McLennan housing development next to Bruce Pulman Park was built on the former army base, made much smaller in the 2010s. Only the SAS troops remain in a small army barracks on the corner of Walters Rd and Grove Road.

=== Transport ===
The Auckland Southern Motorway and the North Island Main Trunk railway run through Takanini. Train and bus services provide the bulk of public transport, with frequent trains on the South City Line between Takanini and the City Centre. Though the motorway and Great South Road flow relatively freely at peak times, road commuters are affected by the acute traffic congestion as they get closer to metropolitan Auckland.

The Southern Pathway is a 4.5 km shared path that runs alongside the Takanini - Papakura section of the Auckland Southern Motorway, it links with adjacent suburbs such as Conifer Grove, Karaka Harbourside and Rosehill.

=== Recreation ===
Bruce Pulman Park is the major sporting location in Takanini. Sports facilities include a scout hall, a gymnastics stadium (the home of Counties-Manukau Gymnastics, a number of outside netball courts now supported by the large-scale Counties-Manukau indoor stadium used for basketball, volleyball, and netball. Bruce Pulman Park also includes a number of rugby, rugby league, and touch fields as well as a full-size cricket oval.

New Zealand's First Sikh Games were held in Bruce Pulman Park. NZ Sikh Sports Complex Takanini was inaugurated in 2021, with Prime Minister Jacinda Ardern part of the inauguration team alongside Sikh Community leaders. According to the Daljit Singh, Chief Spokesperson of Supreme Sikh Society of New Zealand, SSC comprises 7 grounds of different sports like Soccer, Volleyball, Netball, Kabbadi and Athletics. Soccer ground is as per standard of FIFA.
