= Arthur Watson =

Arthur Watson may refer to:

- Arthur Watson (Australian footballer) (1902–1983), Australian rules footballer
- Arthur Watson (cricketer, born 1835) (1835–1920), English cricketer and father of the next
- Arthur Watson (cricketer, born 1866) (1866–1955), English cricketer
- Arthur Watson (cricketer, born 1884) (1884–1952), English cricketer
- Arthur Watson (footballer, died 1931) (1870–1931), English footballer who played for Sheffield United
- Arthur Watson (footballer, died 1937) (1870–1937), English footballer for Notts County
- Arthur Watson (footballer, born 1913) (1913–1995), English football fullback who played for Lincoln City, Chesterfield and Hull City
- Arthur Watson (journalist) (1880–1969), British newspaper editor
- Arthur Watson (priest) (1864–1952), Archdeacon of Richmond
- Arthur Watson (umpire) (born 1940), Australian cricket umpire
- Arthur Christopher Watson (1927–2001), British civil servant
- Arthur K. Watson (1919–1974), president of IBM World Trade Corporation and United States Ambassador to France
- Arthur Kenelm Watson (1867–1947), English teacher and cricketer
- Arthur Watson, director of the Baltimore City Zoo
- Art Watson (1884–1950), baseball player
