= Onehunga Blockhouse =

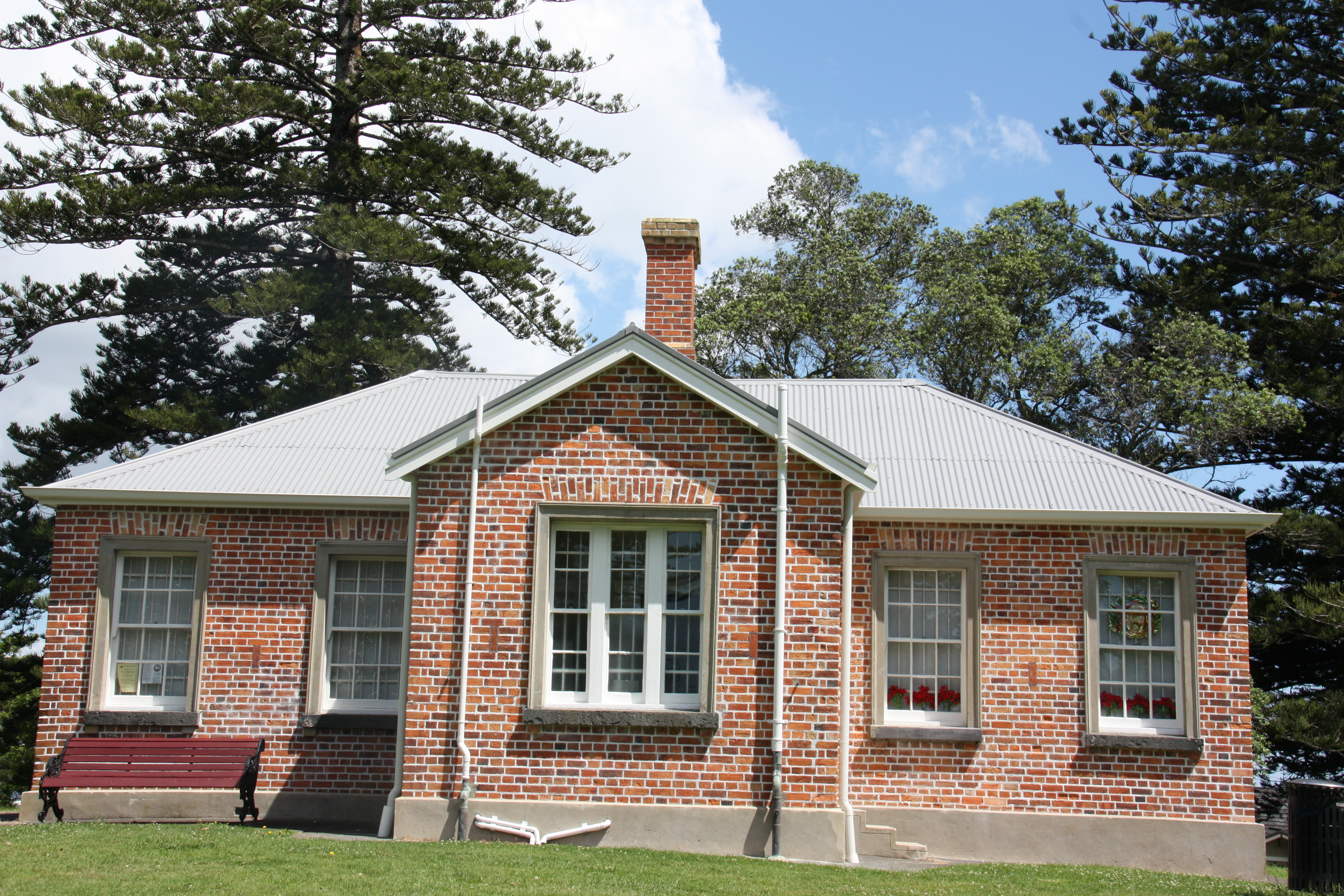
- Onehunga Blockhouse in 2024
- Interactive map of the Onehunga Blockhouse area

General information
- Type: Blockhouse
- Architectural style: Colonial-Georgian
- Location: 80 Quadrant Road; Onehunga, Auckland; New Zealand
- Coordinates: 36°55′07″S 174°46′49″E
- Completed: 1860

Design and construction
- Architect: John Redwood

Heritage New Zealand – Category 1
- Designated: 4 April 1984
- Reference no.: 91

The Onehunga Blockhouse is a historic blockhouse located in the suburb of Onehunga in Auckland, New Zealand within the bounds of Jellicoe Park. Built in 1860 as a defence strongpost during the New Zealand Wars, it is currently owned by the Onehunga Fencible and Historical Society.

== History ==
In response to rising tensions with iwi, Earl Grey, the Secretary of State for War and the Colonies, authorised the deployment of the Royal New Zealand Fencible Corp. Governor George Grey decided to locate the fencibles south of Auckland, including Onehunga.

After the emergence of the Kīngitanga movement in 1856, Governor Gore Browne expressed concerns in a dispatch about the vulnerability of wooden houses to arson. Following advice from his deputy, Colonel Mould, Gore Brown ordered the construction of a series of blockhouses as a defence for the town. The Blockhouse was constructed strategically in Onehunga's Green Hill Reserve so hostile canoes coming from Waiuku or Papakura channels and Māngere shore can be visible. Colonel Mould's plan was constructed by contractor John Redwood and was completed by November 1860.

The Blockhouse was initially given to the 2nd Battalion, Auckland Militia in December 1860. One room was reserved to be a guardroom for the detachment on duty and the rest were reserved as a Militia office and store for the battalion. The Blockhouse also served as the evacuation point for the women and children of Onehunga in case of an impending attack.

By the end of the 1860s, the Onehunga Blockhouse stopped having military significance. Between 1870 and 1875, the Onehunga Blockhouse was leased by Presbyterian minister George Brown, who operated a private school on the premises. The school was closed in 1873, and the keys to the Blockhouse were returned to the Council in December 1875.

Apart from being used for drills by the Ōtāhuhu Rifle Volunteers in 1876, the Blockhouse remained unoccupied between 1875 and 1880. On 20 March 1880, platelayer Michael Brennan was appointed caretaker of the Greenhill Reserve. He and his wife, Mary, and five children occupied the Onehunga Blockhouse. Michael Brennan died in 1887. Mary remained at the Blockhouse until 1889.

From 1892 to 1959, numerous families occupied the Onehunga Blockhouse, with the Brittain family as the final residential tenants. In 1921, the Green Hill Reserve containing the blockhouse was renamed Jellicoe Park by the Mayor of Onehunga to honour New Zealand's second Governor-General, Viscount Jellicoe. Around this time, repairs costing 85 pounds were made to the Blockhouse. A bathroom was added in 1924 at the cost of 130 pounds.

Between 1962 and 1966, the New Zealand Historic Places Trust and the Onehunga Borough Council substantially restored the Blockhouse. Since the completion of the renovations, the Blockhouse has been used by the Onehunga Lions Club and the Onehunga Fencible and Historical Society.

== Description ==
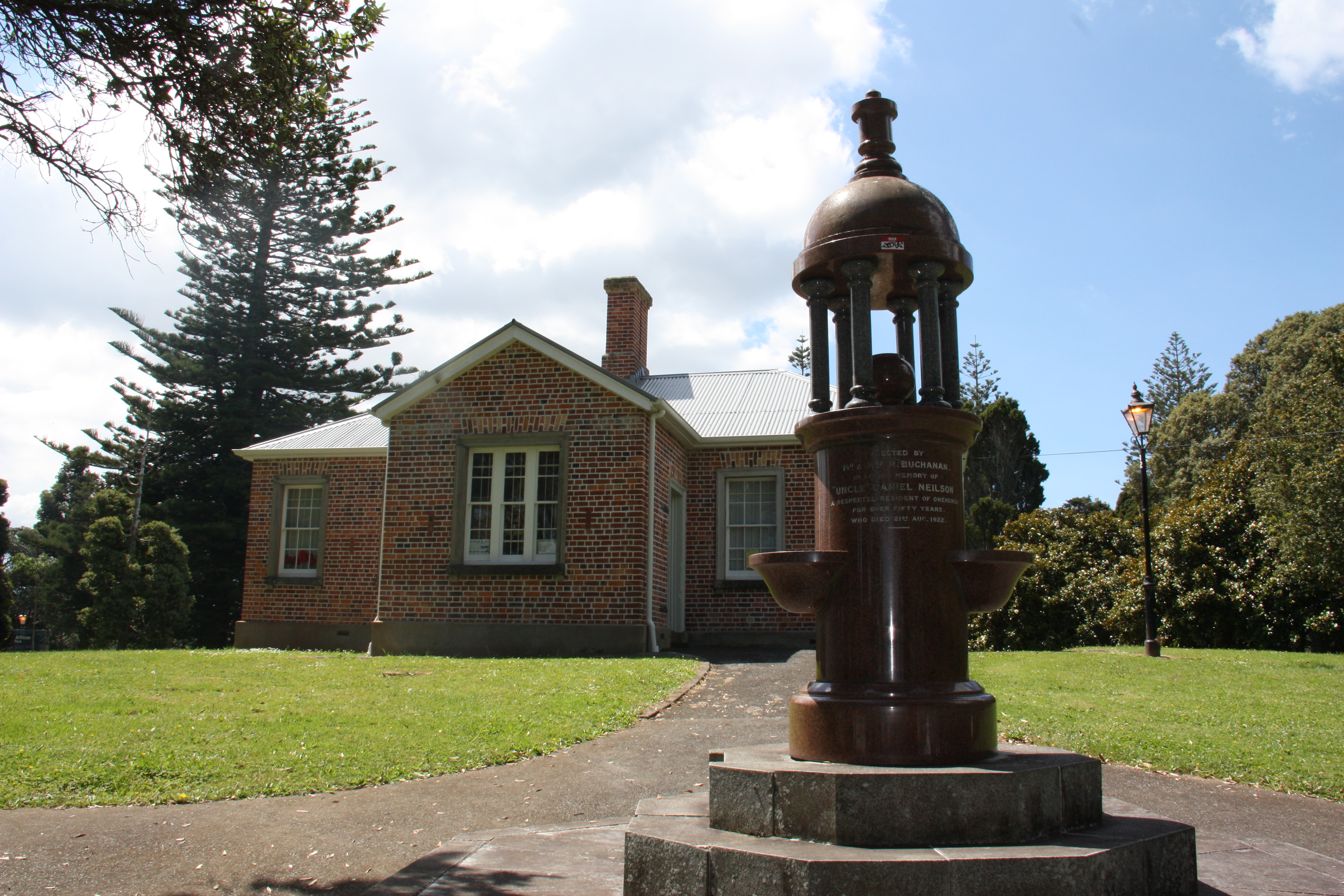
Daniel Neilson Memorial Fountain with the Onehunga Blockhouse in the background.

The Onehunga Blockhouse is a notable example of nineteenth-century colonial military architecture from the 1860s New Zealand Wars. Among the few surviving blockhouses in New Zealand, it is thought to be the only one built in brick by a public body. The blockhouse is designed in the Colonial-Georgian style with a cruciform layout. During its final residential occupation by the Brittain family in the 1960s, the blockhouse had three bedrooms.

Located in Jellicoe Park, the Blockhouse is surrounded by two replicas of fencible cottages: Laishley House and Journey's End. Behind the blockhouse stands a donated water fountain in memory of Daniel Neilson, a local businessman.

== Gallery ==
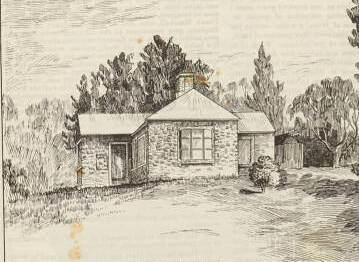
Sketches of the Onehunga Blockhouse in 1892 by C.L. Kelly.

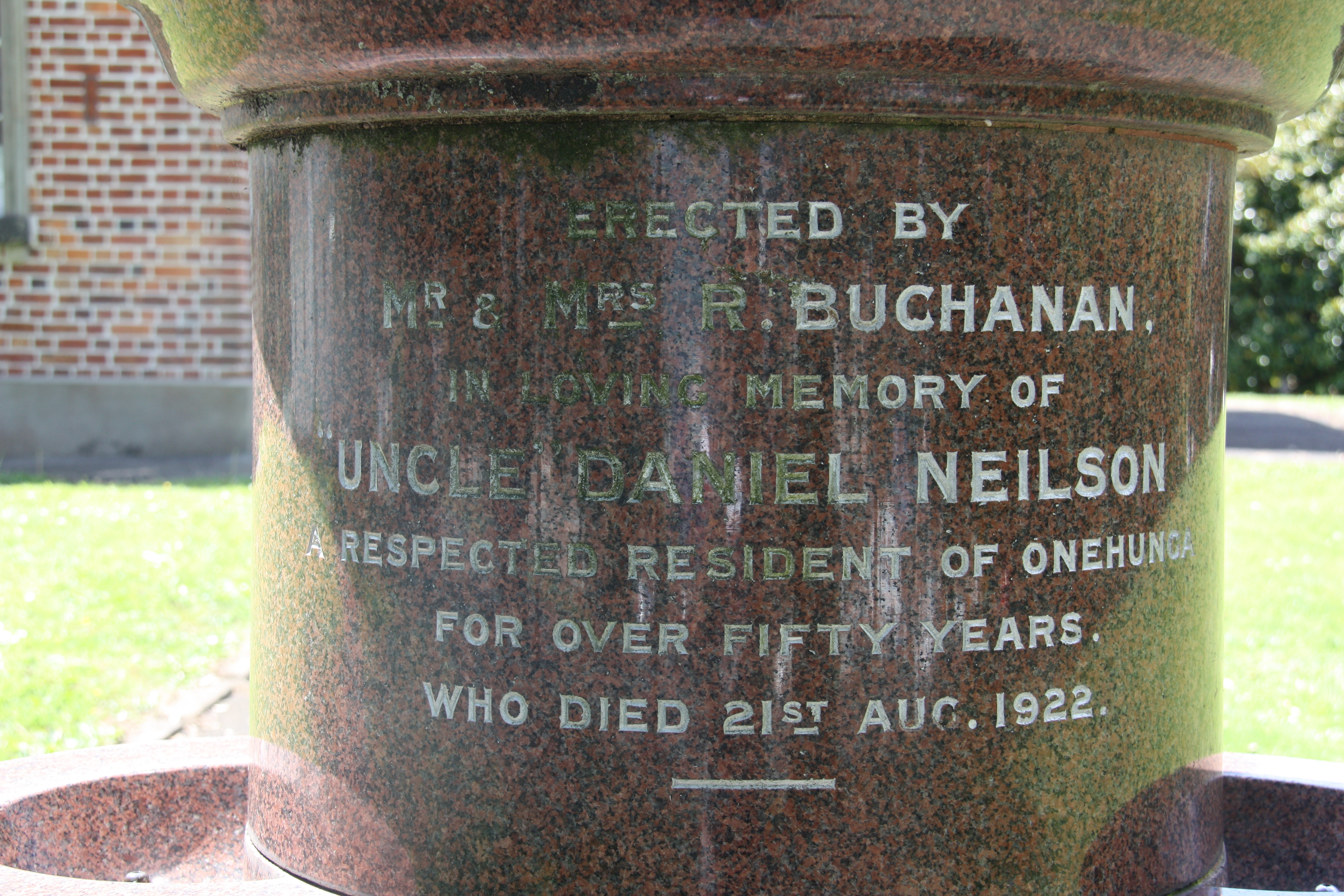
Daniel Neilson memorial fountain inscription

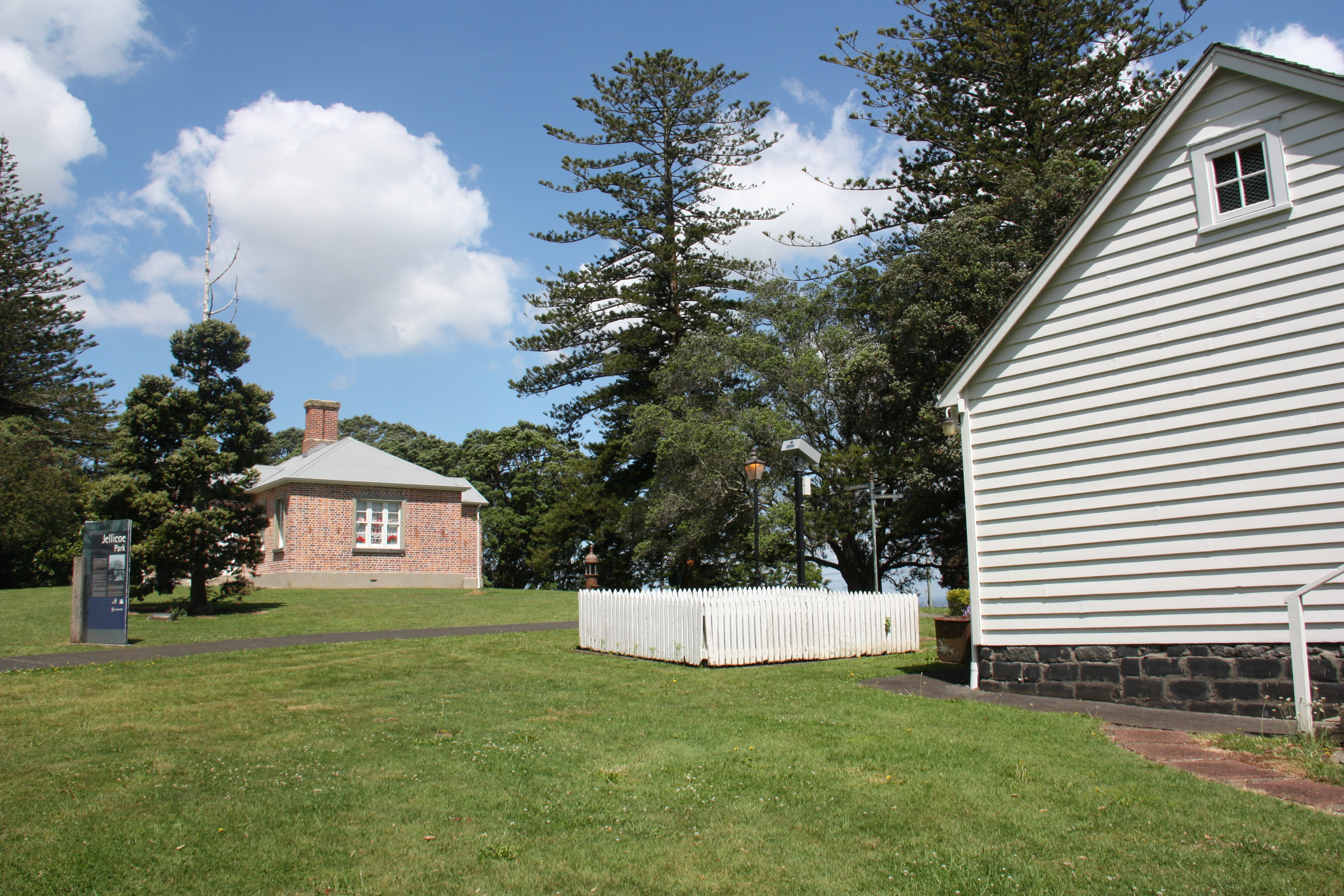
Onehunga Blockhouse with Journey's End in the foreground.
