= Royal Oak, New Zealand =

Royal Oak
- Suburb
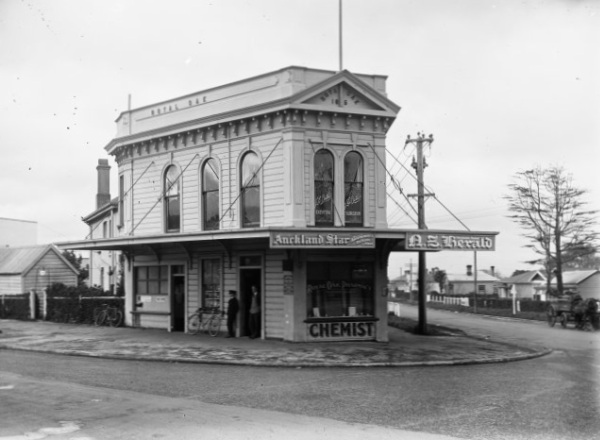
- Pharmacy at today's Royal Oak Roundabout in 1910
- Interactive map of Royal Oak
- Coordinates: 36.911998°S 174.776178°E
- Country: New Zealand
- City: Auckland
- Local authority: Auckland Council
- Electoral ward: Albert-Eden-Puketāpapa ward; Maungakiekie-Tāmaki ward
- Local board: Puketāpapa Local Board; Maungakiekie-Tāmaki Local Board

Area
  - Land: 145 ha (360 acres)

Population (June 2025)
  - Total: 5,880
  - Density: 4,060/km^{2} (10,500/sq mi)

Three Kings	Epsom	One Tree Hill
Mount Roskill	Royal Oak	Oranga
Hillsborough	Māngere Bridge	Onehunga

Royal Oak is a small suburb in New Zealand's largest city of Auckland. It is situated between the suburbs of Epsom (north) and Onehunga (south).

Royal Oak is under the local governance of the Auckland Council.

== History ==
It is named after the Royal Oak hotel that was located on the Royal Oak Roundabout. In 1909 the hotel lost its licence to sell alcohol. For many years it was a pharmacy before being used as the premises of Barfoot & Thompson Real Estate Agency. Royal Oak refers to the tree Charles II hid up during the Battle of Worcester to avoid capture.

In the middle of the Royal Oak Roundabout was once located the Seddon Memorial. Designed by John Park, a local architect who was also mayor of Onehunga on two occasions, the structure was erected in memory of Prime Minister Seddon who died suddenly in office in 1906. Richard John Seddon (1845–1906) was immensely popular and there are several monuments to him around the country. The Royal Oak Monument was in the form of a Gothic Market Cross and was a combined tram shelter, gas lamp standard and drinking fountain.

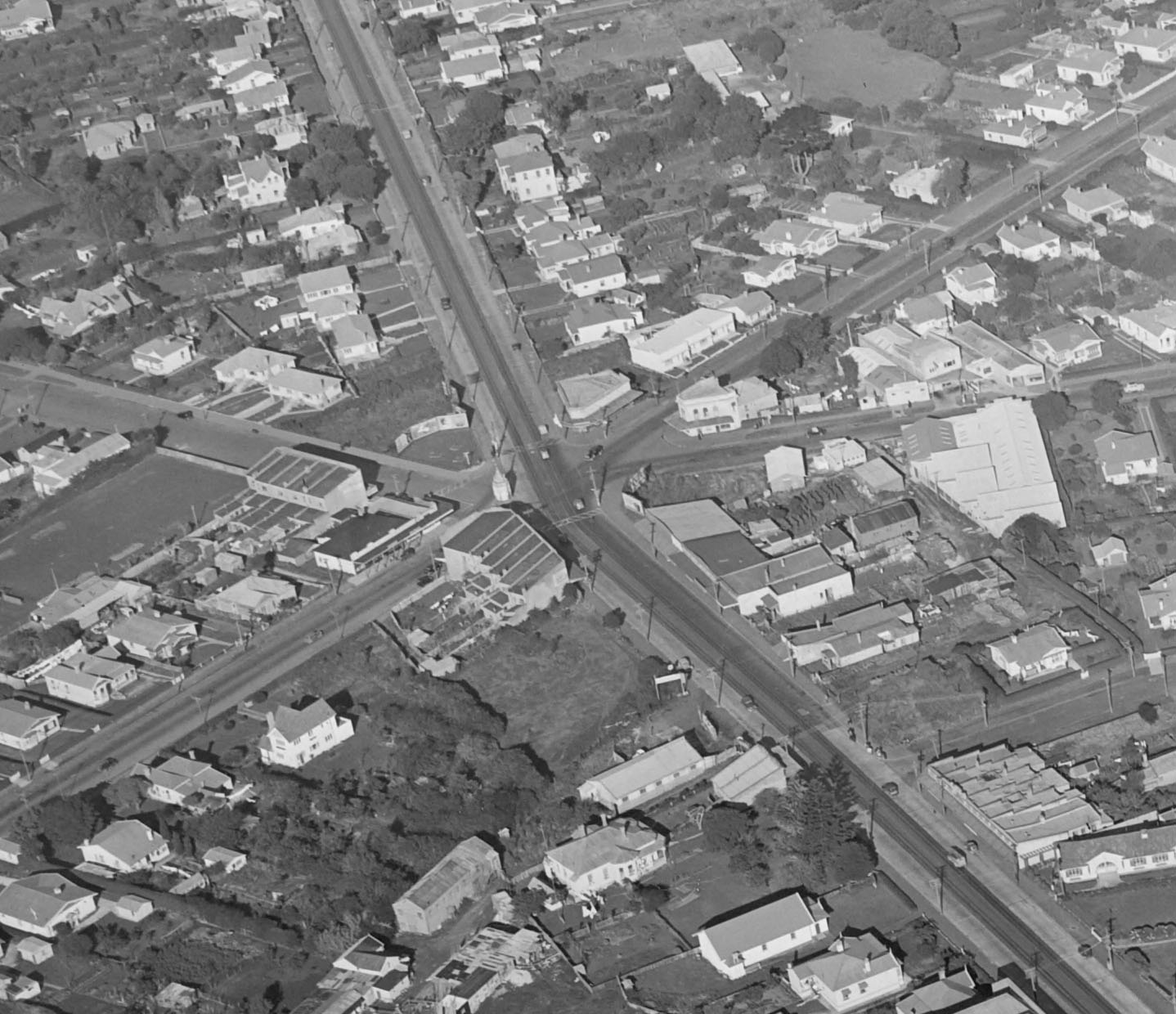
An aerial view of the Royal Oak intersection taken in May 1947. The Seddon Memorial is visible in the centre.

By the middle of the 20th century, it was decided that the memorial was an obstruction to traffic and it was removed during September and October 1947. The Royal Oak roundabout served six converging roads but one has been closed off in recent years.

Royal Oak became the site of New Zealand's first Kentucky Fried Chicken restaurant in 1971. It is located on the Manukau Road side of the Royal Oak Roundabout. It is still in operation as of June, 2024.

Royal Oak Mall was expanded significantly in the 1980s to become a significant source of commerce in the area.

=== Boyd Zoo ===
Royal Oak was once home to Boyd Zoo, one of the earliest Zoological Garden in New Zealand. It was opened in 1912 by local businessman (and future mayor of Onehunga) John James Boyd. It held 600 to 2000 specimens including several lions, bears, wolves, flamingos, and other exotic animals. Most of the animals were kept in relatively poor conditions. There was an abattoir on site where local stray animals such as horses and cats were slaughtered to be fed to the captive animals.

There is an often repeated tale of a lion escaping from the zoo and wandering around the streets of Onehunga, however this story is somewhat erroneous and misleading. The first appearance of the story was in a community newspaper in 1966. The most probable origin of the story was a lion cub which had gotten into a paddock of cows with calves around the Christmas of 1917. Rather than a wild lion roaming the streets, the small cub was backed into a corner of the paddock by the herd until it was lassoed and returned to its enclosure.

Although the zoo was popular with visitors, the noise and smell made it very unpopular with the locals. Boyd was engaged in a constant battle with the local council over the running of the zoo. Eventually, after several attempts to sell his animals to the council, the council finally reached an agreement with Boyd: 11 lions, 6 bears, and 2 wolves were sold to the council for £800. The animals were given to the newly established Auckland Zoo at Western Springs in 1922.

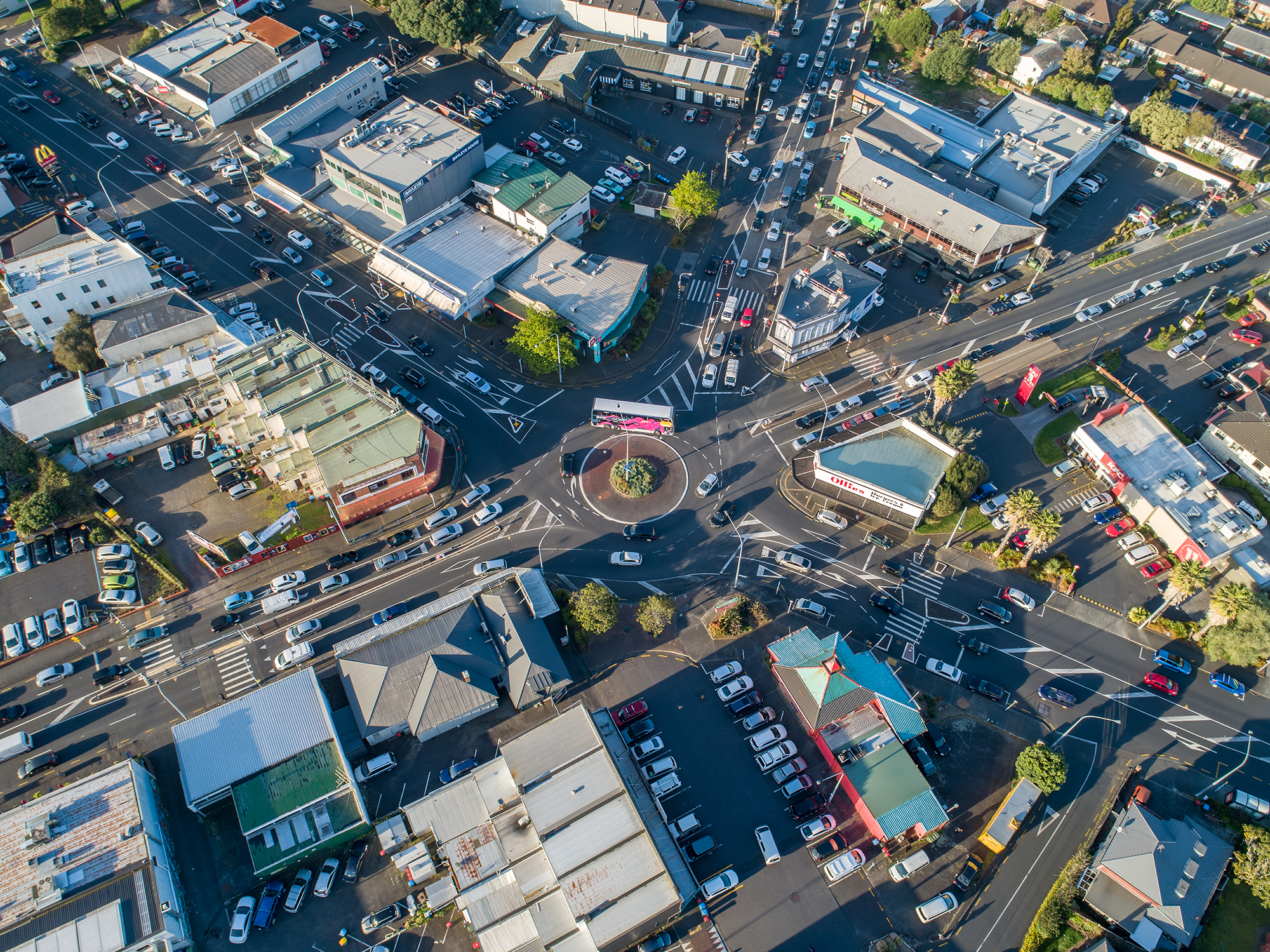
Drone photograph showing Royal Oak Roundabout

The Boyd Zoo site was later built on as a temporary hospital for American Marines in 1942, before being converted into Manukau Intermediate School (now renamed as Royal Oak Intermediate School).

== Demographics ==
Royal Oak covers 1.45 km^{2} (0.56 sq mi) and had an estimated population of 5,880 as of June 2025, with a population density of 4,055 people per km^{2}.

Historical population
Year	Pop.	±% p.a.
2006	4,731	—
2013	4,914	+0.54%
2018	5,334	+1.65%
2023	5,361	+0.10%

Royal Oak (Auckland) had a population of 5,361 in the 2023 New Zealand census, an increase of 27 people (0.5%) since the 2018 census, and an increase of 447 people (9.1%) since the 2013 census. There were 2,586 males, 2,748 females and 27 people of other genders in 1,941 dwellings. 4.5% of people identified as LGBTIQ+. The median age was 38.9 years (compared with 38.1 years nationally). There were 765 people (14.3%) aged under 15 years, 1,104 (20.6%) aged 15 to 29, 2,397 (44.7%) aged 30 to 64, and 1,092 (20.4%) aged 65 or older.

People could identify as more than one ethnicity. The results were 46.6% European (Pākehā); 7.6% Māori; 8.6% Pasifika; 43.1% Asian; 3.3% Middle Eastern, Latin American and African New Zealanders (MELAA); and 1.5% other, which includes people giving their ethnicity as "New Zealander". English was spoken by 91.6%, Māori language by 1.6%, Samoan by 1.7%, and other languages by 37.8%. No language could be spoken by 2.5% (e.g. too young to talk). New Zealand Sign Language was known by 0.2%. The percentage of people born overseas was 49.1, compared with 28.8% nationally.

Religious affiliations were 35.5% Christian, 6.8% Hindu, 3.3% Islam, 0.3% Māori religious beliefs, 2.7% Buddhist, 0.4% New Age, 0.2% Jewish, and 2.0% other religions. People who answered that they had no religion were 43.0%, and 5.8% of people did not answer the census question.

Of those at least 15 years old, 1,911 (41.6%) people had a bachelor's or higher degree, 1,641 (35.7%) had a post-high school certificate or diploma, and 1,044 (22.7%) people exclusively held high school qualifications. The median income was $45,100, compared with $41,500 nationally. 651 people (14.2%) earned over $100,000 compared to 12.1% nationally. The employment status of those at least 15 was that 2,376 (51.7%) people were employed full-time, 501 (10.9%) were part-time, and 117 (2.5%) were unemployed.

Individual statistical areas
Name	Area (km^{2})	Population	Density (per km^{2})	Dwellings	Median age	Median income
Royal Oak West	0.81	2,673	3,300	885	39.0 years	$45,000
Royal Oak East	0.64	2,685	4,195	1,056	38.7 years	$45,200
New Zealand					38.1 years	$41,500

== Schools ==
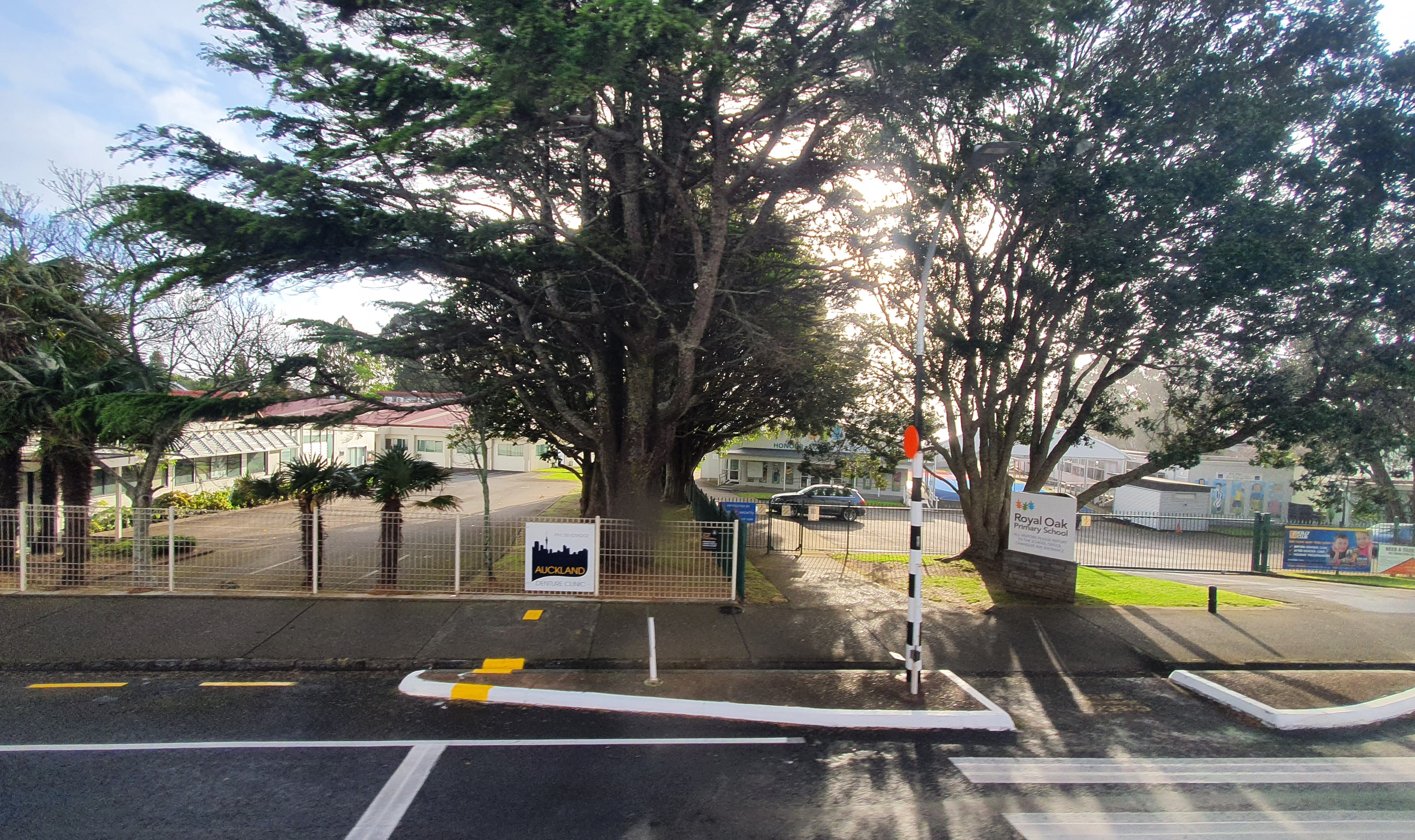
Royal Oak Primary School

Royal Oak Intermediate is an intermediate school (years 7-8) with a roll of 438. Royal Oak Primary School is a contributing primary school (years 1-6) with a roll of 434.

Marcellin College is a state-integrated Catholic secondary school with a roll of 466.

All these schools are coeducational. Rolls are as of July 2026.

Other secondary schools in the area are Epsom Girls' Grammar School, Auckland Grammar School, One Tree Hill College, St Peter's College and Onehunga High School,.
