= Te Hopua a Rangi =

Volcano in Auckland, New Zealand

- Maar
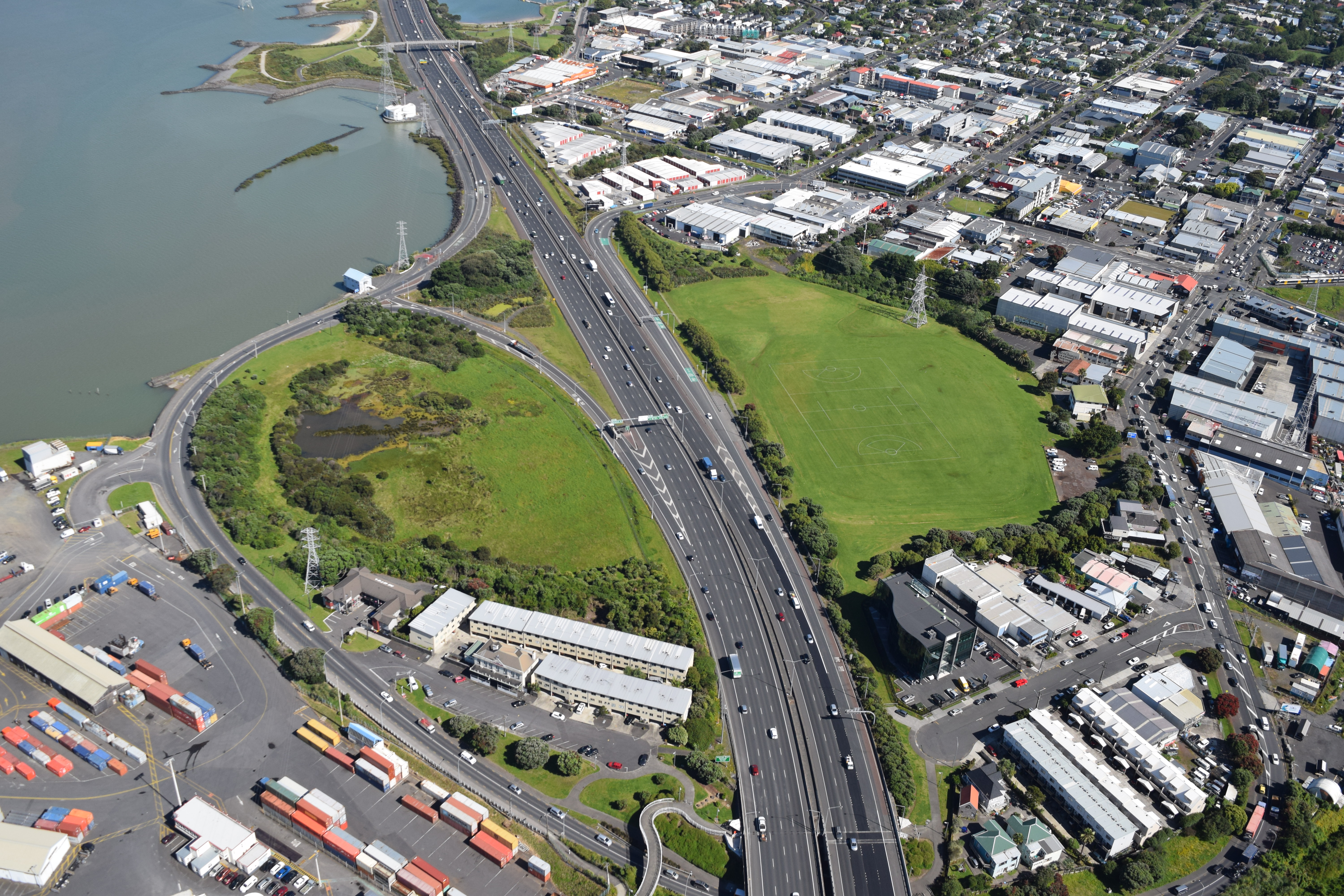
- Aerial view of Te Hopua a Rangi in 2018
- Interactive map of Te Hopua a Rangi
- Coordinates: 36.9295°S 174.784734°E
- Location: Onehunga, Auckland, North Island
- Elevation: 0 m (0 ft)

Te Hopua a Rangi, also known as Gloucester Park, is one of the volcanoes in the Auckland volcanic field in Auckland, New Zealand, and is located in Onehunga. Its 300 m wide, sediment-filled explosion (maar) crater was used as a boat harbour in early European times and known first as Onehunga Basin then as Geddes Basin. It was reclaimed in the 1930s and named Gloucester Park in 1935 after the visit to New Zealand by the Duke of Gloucester in that year. From 1975 into the early 1980s the Southwestern Motorway was built right through the middle of the park and crater. The southern side was turned into a sports ground, and the western side as a wetland with activity space for Aotea Sea Scouts who took ownership of the Manukau Yacht and Motor Boat Club (MYMBC) club house in 1977.

== History ==
According to Mogford, during Edward Morton's term of office as Mayor of Onehunga Borough, 1929–1935:

...the controversial decision was made to use the old crater near the wharf for a council rubbish tip. There was some protest that this unique geological formation was to be destroyed and lost forever in this reclamation, but the authorities and general public were not so environmentally aware of our heritage as they are today. In the span of a few years the crater was cut off by road, filled in, levelled, grassed and renamed with due ceremony Gloucester Park in honour of the King's brother, the Duke of Gloucester, who had paid a goodwill visit to New Zealand at the end of 1934.

Gloucester Park speedway was opened on 5 January 1935 by the Governor-general. Onehunga Borough, however, were still filling and reclaiming at the park up to at least 1941.

The army occupied Te Hopua a Rangi between 1941 and 1946, building barracks along its western side close to the sea, and occupying the MYMBC club house until 1945, when the MYMBC celebrated the return of the building with a grand re-opening dance on 21 July 1945. Evidence of the camp was all but gone in an aerial photograph from 1948. During the army occupation the Speedway was closed, but reopened again after this and was still active in 1961.

the 2016 Auckland Council Unitary Plan defined Te Hopua a Rangi as an Outstanding Natural Feature as follows.

Item 46 – Hōpua explosion crater and tuff exposure – Hōpua volcano is a small explosion crater with a low tuff ring about 500m in diameter. The original crater was breached by the sea and filled with marine sediments. Although damaged by reclamation and motorway construction, the tuff ring is still discernible as a volcanic feature. An inter-tidal exposure of Hōpua tuff in the Manukau Harbour foreshore contains large blocks of basalt.
