= Arthur Watson (Australian footballer) =

Australian rules footballer (1902–1983)

Personal information
- Full name: Arthur John Watson
- Born: 22 March 1902; Onehunga, New Zealand
- Died: 2 July 1983 (aged 81); Horsham, Victoria
- Original team: Parkdale
- Height: 175 cm (5 ft 9 in)
- Weight: 69 kg (152 lb)

Playing career^{1}
Years	Club	Games (Goals)
1929	Hawthorn	2 (0)
- ^{1} Playing statistics correct to the end of 1929.

Arthur John Watson (22 March 1902 – 2 July 1983) was an Australian rules footballer who played for the Hawthorn Football Club in the Victorian Football League (VFL).
