= Royal Oak Mall =

Shopping mall in Auckland, New Zealand

Coordinates: 36.9110°S 174.7749°E

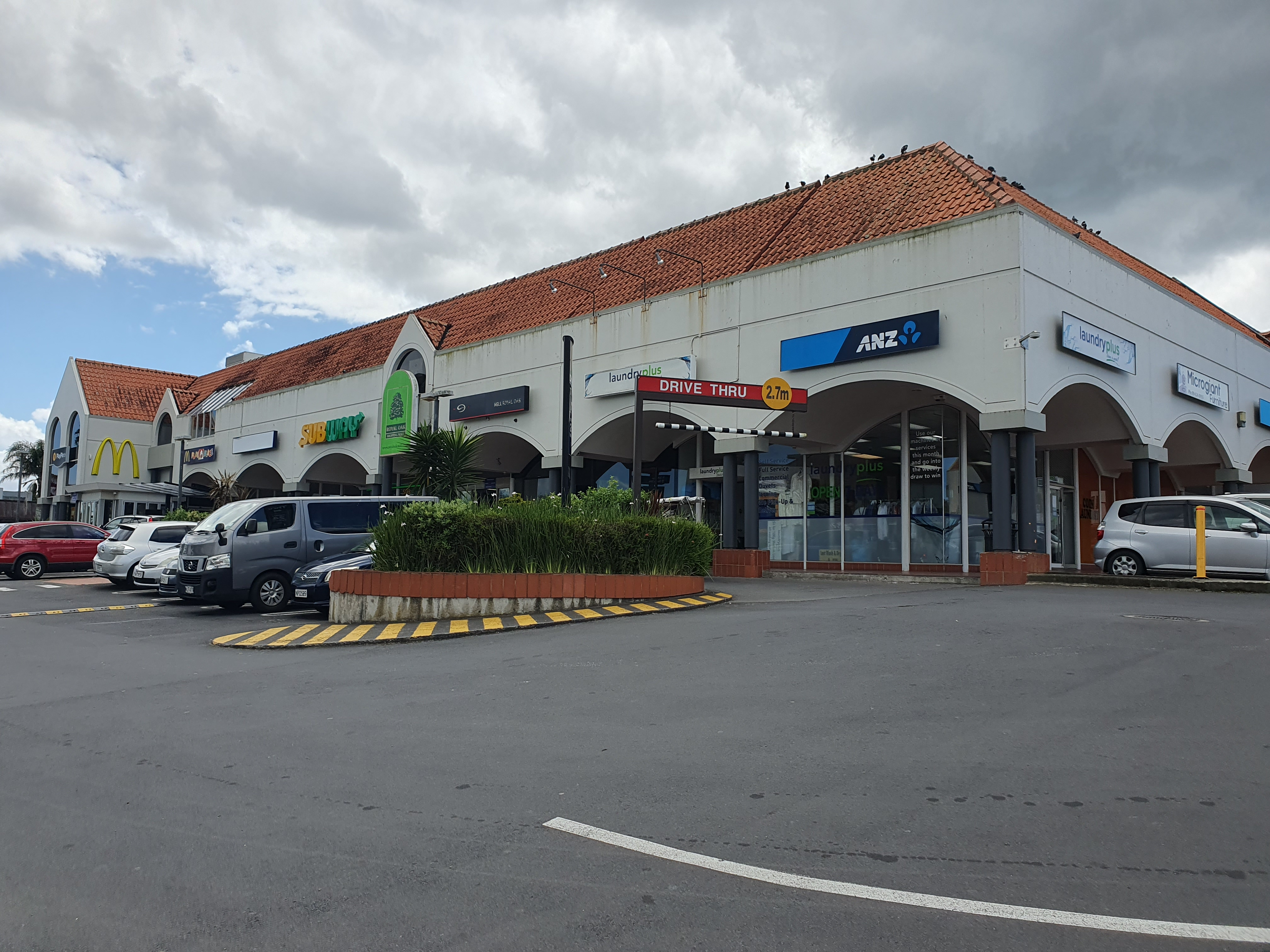
The Royal Oak Mall

Royal Oak Mall is a shopping centre located in Royal Oak, Auckland, New Zealand, on Manukau Road. Completed in 1988, it has been a significant business hub in the area. The mall underwent expansions in the mid-1980s, 1993 and 2009, enhancing its capacity and the variety of services offered.

== History ==
The Royal Oak Mall was initially completed in 1988, serving as a key commercial and social gathering place in Royal Oak. Its first expansion in the mid-1980s was followed by further developments in 1993 and 2009. These expansions have allowed the mall to accommodate a wider range of shops and services, catering to the growing needs of the local community.

== Renovation and modernisation ==
After many years of wear and tear, Royal Oak Mall underwent a major refurbishment to revitalize its appearance and functionality. The renovation, which touched every aspect of the mall from the interior to the exterior, included replacing outdated flooring with fresh new tiling and adopting a new colour scheme to modernize the look and feel of the mall. The exterior of the main building was refreshed with hues of Resene Arrowtown, and the columns were accented with Resene Double Arrowtown. Inside, the mall adopted a lightened palette with Resene Quarter Thorndon Cream as the backbone, complemented by Resene Aluminium on barrel vaults and Resene Masala on columns and dado lines. This comprehensive makeover aimed to enhance the shopping experience, blending a new, modern aesthetic with the mall's established environment.

== Facilities and stores ==
The mall houses over 50 shops, offering a diverse range of products and services. These include grocery stores, homeware and furniture outlets, and travel agencies, among others. This variety makes the mall a one-stop destination for shopping and services in the Royal Oak area.

== Operating hours and holidays ==
Royal Oak Mall is closed on New Year's Day, Auckland Anniversary Day, Waitangi Day, Good Friday, and Easter Sunday, reflecting the local observance of these public holidays.
