= Onehunga =

- Suburb
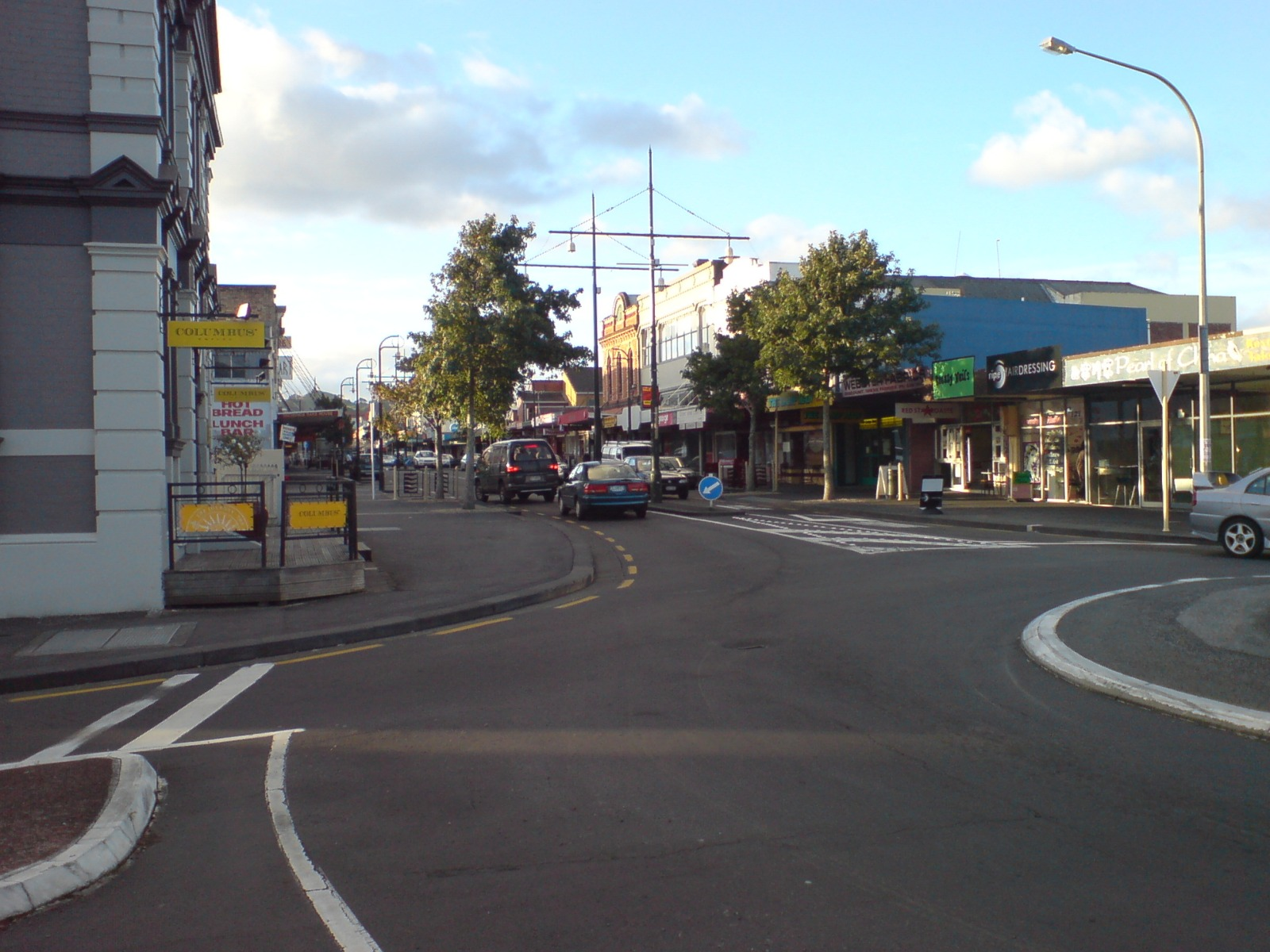
- Onehunga Mall viewed from near the southern end
- Interactive map of Onehunga
- Coordinates: 36°55′20″S 174°47′02″E
- Country: New Zealand
- City: Auckland
- Local authority: Auckland Council
- Electoral ward: Maungakiekie-Tāmaki ward
- Local board: Maungakiekie-Tāmaki Local Board
- Board subdivision: Maungakiekie
- Established: 1843 (European)

Area
  - Land: 563 ha (1,390 acres)

Population (June 2025)
  - Total: 12,370
  - Density: 2,200/km^{2} (5,690/sq mi)
- Train stations: Onehunga railway station

| Royal Oak | One Tree Hill | Oranga |
| Hillsborough | Onehunga | Te Papapa |
| (Manukau Harbour) | (Manukau Harbour), Māngere Bridge | (Manukau Harbour) |

Onehunga is a suburb of Auckland in New Zealand and the location of the Port of Onehunga, the city's small port on the Manukau Harbour. It is eight kilometres (five miles) south of the city centre, close to the volcanic cone of Maungakiekie / One Tree Hill.

Onehunga is a residential and light-industrial suburb. There are almost 1,000 commercial and industrial businesses in the area. Onehunga stretches south from Royal Oak to the northern shore of the Manukau Harbour. To the east are the areas of Oranga and Te Papapa; to the west, Hillsborough. On the southern shore of the Manukau Harbour, and linked to Onehunga by two bridges, is the suburb of Māngere Bridge.

== Geography ==
Onehunga lies on the Auckland isthmus, on the northern shore of Mangere Inlet, an arm of the Manukau Harbour, and just south of the volcanic cone of Maungakiekie / One Tree Hill. The Port of Onehunga, on Manukau Harbour, is now much smaller than Auckland's east coast port on the Waitematā Harbour, but in the 19th century it was the larger. The wharves are located on reclaimed land bordering a low volcanic crater called Te Hopua, once occupied by a tidal lagoon opening to the southwest, but which has also been reclaimed.

Onehunga's southwestern side, near the Manukau Harbour, lost its direct waterfront access when the Southwest Motorway was built there in the 1970s. Only a tidal lagoon remains on the city side, though in 2008, there were proposals that the motorway (which was to be widened) could be sunk into a trench to provide direct access to the harbour again. In 2013, a project was underway to restore the Onehunga foreshore, to be connected to the city-side park by a pedestrian and cycle bridge over State Highway 20.

A substantial aquifer flows underground beneath Onehunga, fed by rainwater soaking through the lava flows around Maungakiekie / One Tree Hill. Up to 21 million litres of potable water a day was pumped from the Onehunga aquifer and treated in a local plant before being supplied to Onehunga as part of the Auckland water supply network. As of October 2022 the supply of water was shut down due to an unsafe amount of poly-fluorinated alkyl substances(PFAS), it expected to be fitted with equipment to filter out PFAS in 2027 and reopen. While most of Auckland's potable water comes from reservoirs in the Hunua and Waitākere Ranges, or from the Waikato River, the Onehunga aquifer provides around 5%. In contrast, while the isthmus's other major aquifer, the Western Springs aquifer, is also fed by water seeping through lava fields, it is no longer used as a source of potable water.

== Etymology ==
The name Onehunga is from the Māori language and means a "beach composed of mixed sand and mud" or "alluvial soil", according to Williams's Dictionary of the Maori Language.

Claims have been made for other names and meanings. Ethnographer George Graham was told by one Māori informant that the name was Ōnehunga, with the etymology of ō (the place of) nehunga (burial), but Graham said that was later contradicted. He said that the name was actually Oneunga (Oneūnga in modern orthography), meaning one (beach or sand) ūnga (landing), in reference to canoes being drawn up there. He also said that Onehunga meant "friable" or "pulverous soil" and that this was "a very correct name".

The New Zealand Geographic Board approved Onehunga as the official name in 2019.

== History ==
=== Prehistory ===
The area of Onehunga was first occupied by Ngati Tahuhu. In the 1740s Ngati Whatua conquered the Auckland isthmus. By the early 19th-century a Ngati Whatua settlement existed at what is today the bottom of Princes Street. Individual settlers purchased land from Maori in the Onehunga area but these purchases were challenged by the government, which ultimately obtained the land to establish a fencible settlement.

=== Early European town ===
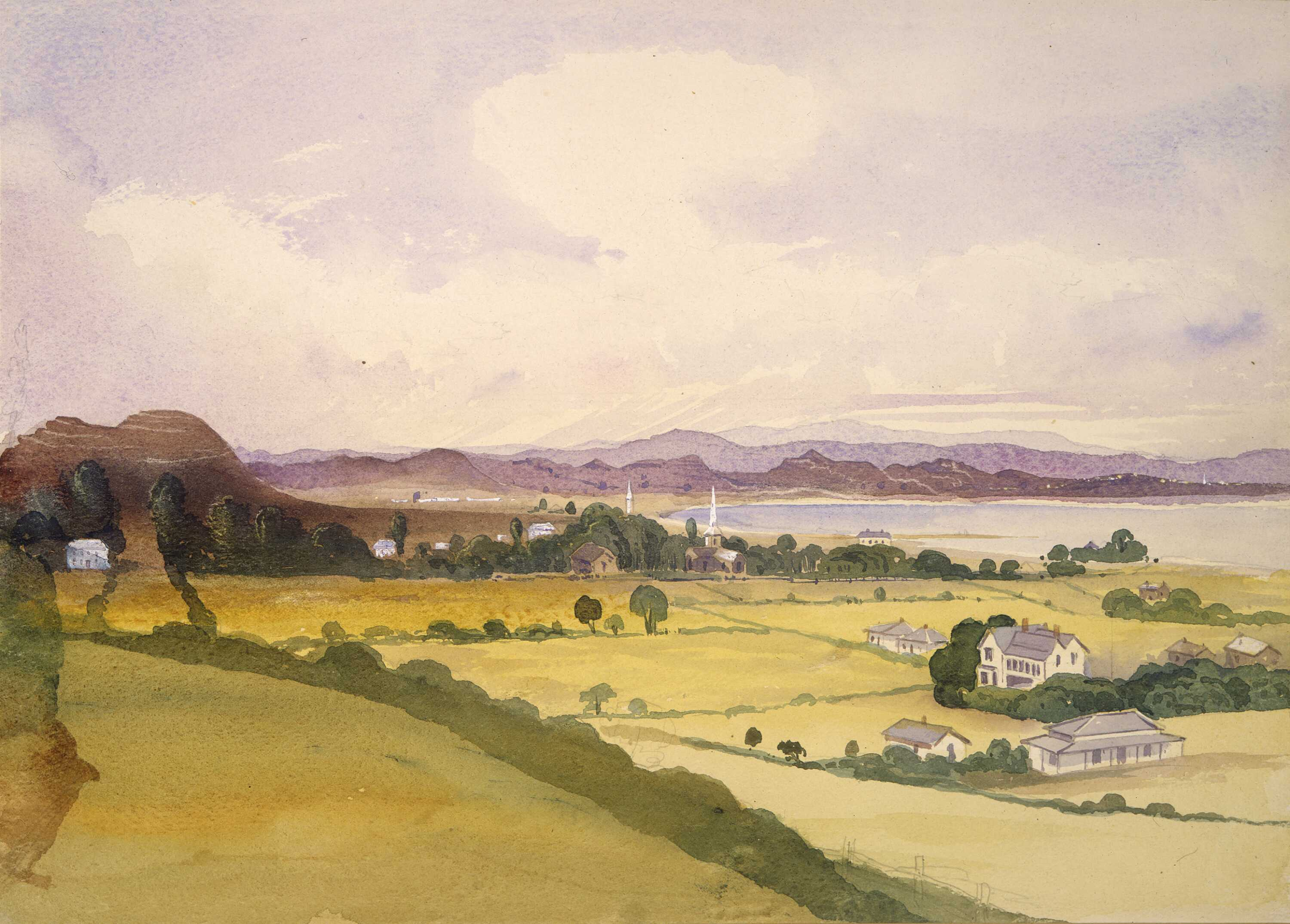
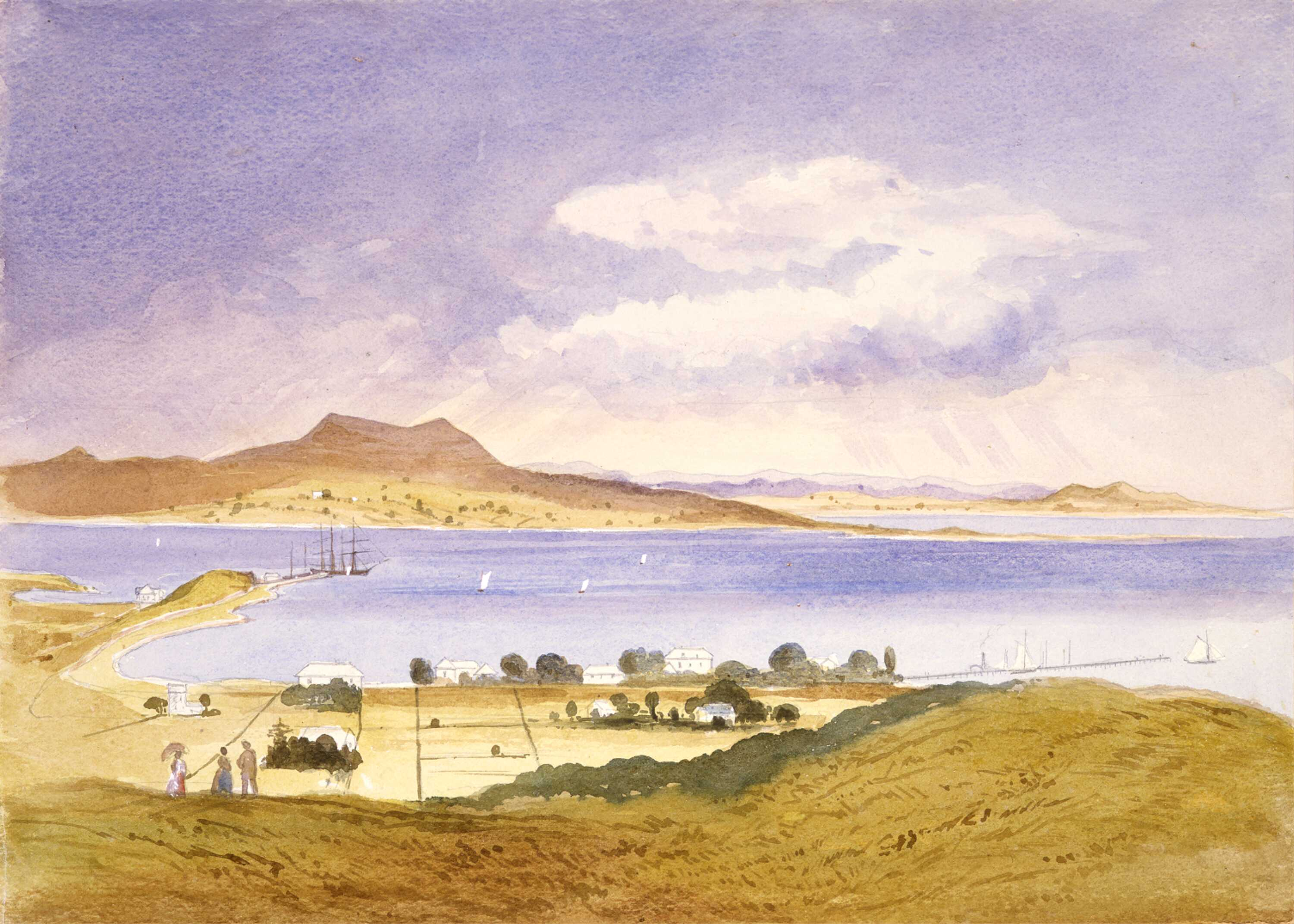
Watercolour sketches of Onehunga by William Fox, circa 1863

The European village of Onehunga was founded as a Fencible settlement by Governor Grey. The Fencibles were former soldiers, many of them Irish, who were granted land to settle on, with the implied understanding that if Māori threatened the Auckland isthmus, they would defend it. Onehunga was the first village for Fencibles in New Zealand. Grey chose the site in 1846 and the Fencibles arrived in 1847.

European settlement of the Manukau Harbour area was begun from and long focused on Onehunga. When the New Zealand Wars later occurred, it was mostly fought with regular soldiers rather than Fencibles. Naval volunteers based at Onehunga raided Māori territories on the south side of the harbour during the wars.

Map of Onehunga, 1911

During the Invasion of the Waikato in 1863 many women and children from small European settlements arrived in Onehunga as refugees. The Onehunga Ladies' Benevolent Society was formed to care for the refugees. It was the oldest surviving women's organisation in New Zealand at the time of its deregistration in 2017.

During the 19th century most shipping between New Zealand and Great Britain came to Onehunga, via South Africa and Australia. While some shipping entered the Waitematā Harbour and docked at Auckland, much of it entered the Manukau Heads and docked at Onehunga, thus saving several days sailing around North Cape. The Manukau Harbour was treacherous however (as evidenced by the sinking of HMS Orpheus in 1863, killing 180 people) but the coastal steamship lines carried virtually all passenger and freight trade between Auckland and Wellington via Wanganui and Onehunga.

Onehunga was also the main route to and from the south, as most shipping routes were shorter via the western coast of the North Island than around the east coast to the Waitematā Harbour. Until 1908 a steamer from Onehunga was the fastest means of travel from Auckland to Wellington, the capital of the colony (initially the sea journey went all the way, then later it connected to the New Plymouth Express instead).

By the First World War Onehunga was no longer an important commercial port. This was partly because of a general increase in the size of ships, which meant the Waitematā Harbour was favoured, especially as it was wider and deeper. More significant however was the completion of the North Island Main Trunk railway in 1908 – this effectively made the coastal passenger and freight steamship trade on both coasts of the country largely unprofitable. Coastal shipping did continue at Onehunga until the 2010s. The port still serves some local fishing, and a cement and sand company maintains facilities there.

In 1874, the town of Onehunga had 2,044 inhabitants, compared with Wellington's 10,547, reflecting the importance of the smaller port towns during an age when New Zealand was booming, but internal transport links were still rudimentary. In 1877, Onehunga was declared a borough with a mayor and 16 councillors.

From 1883, until around 1903 when it was partially demolished, the Onehunga Ironworks was situated in the town. It operated until around 1895. The ironworks was located opposite the original Onehunga railway station. Its chimney and some structures survived into the late 1960s.

From 1885, the town became known for its wool industry (several firms maintained factories here including one which produced blankets). This weaving industry saved the area from more serious decline when the shipping trade reduced after 1908. As the centre of the Auckland isthmus became covered by suburban developments the Onehunga foreshore became an attraction for families from Mount Eden, Epsom and One Tree Hill. The beach at Onehunga became popular after the electric tram route was completed in 1906 and the Tea Rooms situated at the tram terminus, overlooking the harbour were an attraction in their own right.

After the Municipal Abattoir was relocated from Freeman's Bay to Westfield and Southdown, Onehunga started to suffer from the toxic discharges the freezing works pumped into the harbour. This effectively put an end to Onehunga's emerging role as a seaside resort and also made it a less attractive place to live. By the late 1930s the water quality of the harbour was poor, with a discernible downturn in fish and wildlife numbers. It became unsafe to eat any shellfish for example and fish numbers dwindled. The installation of a large sewerage treatment plant in the harbour in the 1960s only made things worse. Since the decommissioning of the freezing works at Westfield and Southdown and a redesign of the Manukau Sewerage Treatment Works, the quality of the water has increased significantly.

In 1893, Elizabeth Yates became mayor of Onehunga. While she was defeated at the polls only one year later, she was the first woman in the British Empire to hold such a post.

Onehunga had for a short time Auckland's first zoo. However, the zoological garden that John James Boyd created near today's Royal Oak did not meet with local approval – mainly due to concerns about the smells and crowds. Eleven years after its November 1911 opening, the animals were bought and transferred to the new Auckland Zoo at Western Springs.

In 1909 Onehunga used a grant to build a Carnegie Free Library. This building served until 1970 and now houses a pub.

=== Merging with Auckland ===
While in 1891 Onehunga was one of the "25 most populous urban areas/towns of New Zealand", with about 5,000 inhabitants, by the First World War it had ceased to be a port of importance. It gained a new role as a shopping and service centre as it was engulfed by the suburban development of Auckland, and was amalgamated with Auckland City in 1989.

Although the area was a predominantly working-class suburb for much of the 20th century, it has undergone some gentrification since the 1990s. In recent times, many of the bungalows of the 1920s (along with the earlier villas) have undergone restoration. Secondary schools located nearby are Onehunga High School, One Tree Hill College and Marcellin College. Some boys also attend St Peter's College.

== Local government ==
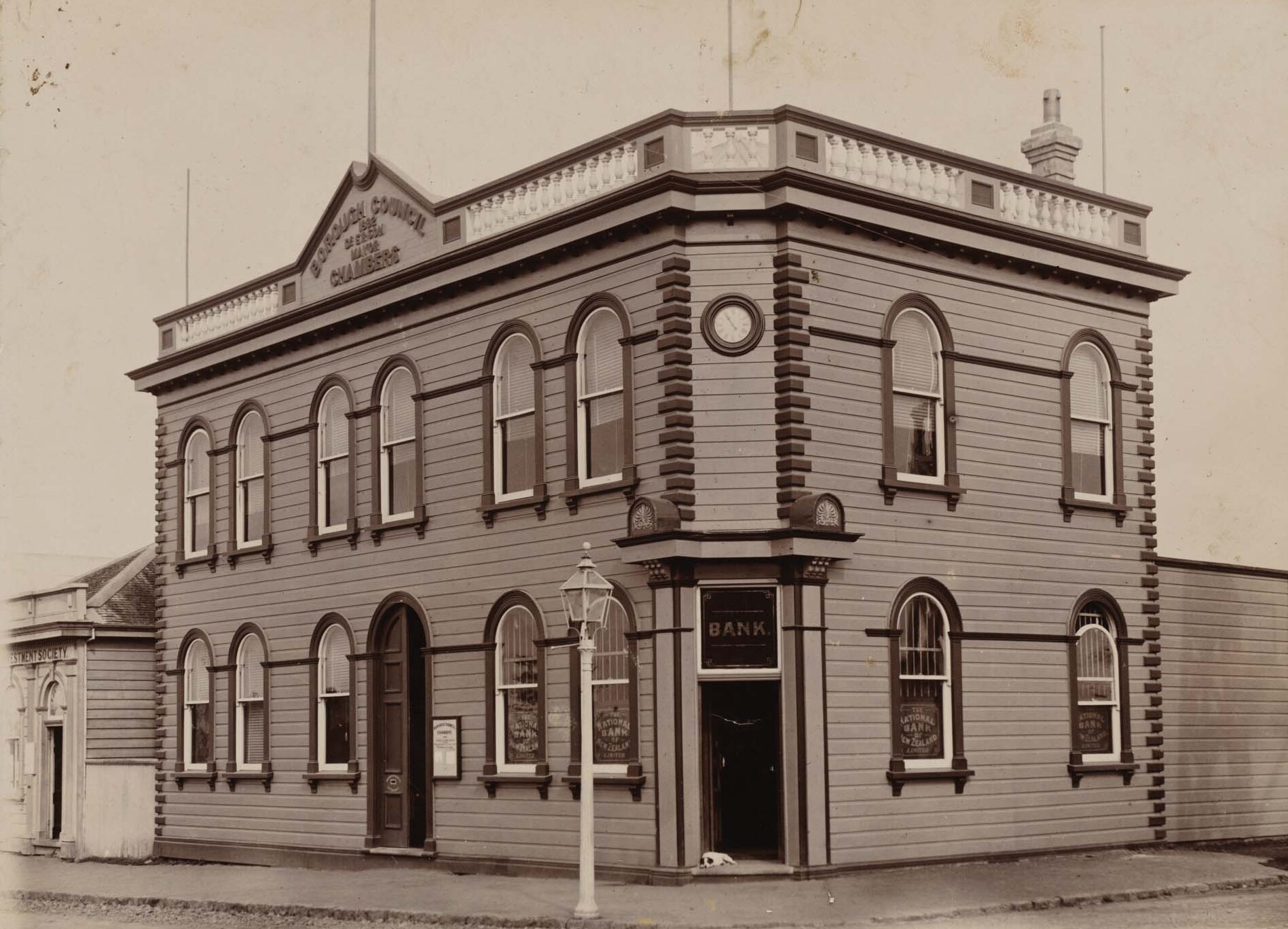
Onehunga Council Chambers, circa 1900s

The first local government for the settlement was the Hundred of Onehunga, formed in 1848. This was replaced with the Township of Onehunga Highway District in 1868, which in turn was replaced with the Borough of Onehunga in 1877. The borough expanded northwards via annexation of part of the One Tree Hill Road District in 1911–1916 and 1925 as well as an annexation of part of the Mount Roskill Road District in 1936. The borough governed Onehunga until it was abolished as part of the 1989 local government reforms.

=== Mayors of Onehunga Borough Council ===
- John Dickenson Jackson, 1877–1877
- James William Waller, 1877–1878
- Thomas George Blakey, 1878–1879
- George Codlin, 1879–1880
- Thomas George Blakey, 1880–1881
- George Codlin, 1881–1883
- Dr. William George Scott, 1883–1884
- John Dickenson Jackson, 1884–1885
- Dr. William George Scott, 1885–1886
- Dr. William Robert Close Erson, 1886–1887
- Charles Colville Fleming, 1887–1888
- Captain Michael Yates, 1888–1892
- Dr. William Robert Close Erson, 1892–1893
- Elizabeth Yates, 1893–1894
- Donald Alexander Sutherland, 1894–1897
- Frederick William Court, 1897–1898
- Dr. William Robert Close Erson, 1898–1901
- Donald Alexander Sutherland, 1901–1904
- Angus William Gordon, 1905–1905
- John Rowe, 1906–1917
- John James Boyd, 1917–1917
- John Stoupe, 1917–1919
- John Park, 1919–1923
- James Edward Cowell, 1923–1927
- William Charles Coldicutt, 1927–1929
- Edward Morton, 1929–1935
- John Park, 1935–1938
- Archer Garside, 1944–1959
- Leon Abraham Manning, 1959–1968
- Thomas Victor Gerrard Beeson, 1968–1974
- Leon Abraham Manning, 1974–1980
- John Lawrence Henderson, 1980–1986
- Graham Johnson Mountjoy, 1986–1989

== Demographics ==
Onehunga comprises four statistical areas. Onehunga West, North and Central are primarily residential/commercial. Onehunga-Te Papapa Industrial is primarily industrial.

Individual statistical areas
| Name | Area (km^{2}) | Population | Density (per km^{2}) | Dwellings | Median age | Median income |
|---|---|---|---|---|---|---|
| Onehunga North | 0.77 | 3,771 | 4,897 | 1,392 | 36.5 years | $50,600 |
| Onehunga West | 0.97 | 3,261 | 3,362 | 1,227 | 37.7 years | $56,100 |
| Onehunga Central | 0.86 | 3,045 | 3,541 | 1,251 | 37.3 years | $51,600 |
| Onehunga-Te Papapa Industrial | 3.03 | 1,134 | 374 | 537 | 34.8 years | $54,300 |
| New Zealand | | | | | 38.1 years | $41,500 |

=== Residential area ===
The residential/commercial area of Onehunga covers 2.60 km^{2} (1.00 sq mi) and had an estimated population of 11,040 as of June 2025, with a population density of 4,246 people per km^{2}.

Historical population for the residential area
| Year | Pop. | ±% p.a. |
|---|---|---|
| 2006 | 9,618 | — |
| 2013 | 9,804 | +0.27% |
| 2018 | 10,446 | +1.28% |
| 2023 | 10,077 | −0.72% |
The 2006 population is for a larger area of 2.75 km^{2}. Source:

Onehunga residential areas had a population of 10,077 in the 2023 New Zealand census, a decrease of 369 people (−3.5%) since the 2018 census, and an increase of 273 people (2.8%) since the 2013 census. There were 4,872 males, 5,157 females and 45 people of other genders in 3,870 dwellings. 4.6% of people identified as LGBTIQ+. There were 1,716 people (17.0%) aged under 15 years, 1,896 (18.8%) aged 15 to 29, 5,250 (52.1%) aged 30 to 64, and 1,212 (12.0%) aged 65 or older.

People could identify as more than one ethnicity. The reported results were 56.2% European (Pākehā); 11.3% Māori; 17.5% Pasifika; 26.9% Asian; 3.4% Middle Eastern, Latin American and African New Zealanders (MELAA); and 1.4% other, which includes people giving their ethnicity as "New Zealander". English was spoken by 93.3%, Māori language by 2.1%, Samoan by 3.7%, and other languages by 25.9%. No language could be spoken by 2.6% (e.g. too young to talk). New Zealand Sign Language was known by 0.4%. The percentage of people born overseas was 38.6, compared with 28.8% nationally.

Religious affiliations were 37.1% Christian, 3.8% Hindu, 1.8% Islam, 0.6% Māori religious beliefs, 1.4% Buddhist, 0.4% New Age, 0.1% Jewish, and 1.9% other religions. People who answered that they had no religion were 47.5%, and 5.3% of people did not answer the census question.

Of those at least 15 years old, 3,225 (38.6%) people had a bachelor's or higher degree, 3,228 (38.6%) had a post-high school certificate or diploma, and 1,893 (22.6%) people exclusively held high school qualifications. 1,518 people (18.2%) earned over $100,000 compared to 12.1% nationally. The employment status of those at least 15 was that 4,944 (59.1%) people were employed full-time, 927 (11.1%) were part-time, and 219 (2.6%) were unemployed.

=== Industrial area ===
Onehunga-Te Papapa Industrial covers 3.03 km^{2} (1.17 sq mi) and had an estimated population of 1,330 as of June 2025, with a population density of 439 people per km^{2}.

Historical population for the industrial area
| Year | Pop. | ±% p.a. |
|---|---|---|
| 2006 | 618 | — |
| 2013 | 840 | +4.48% |
| 2018 | 870 | +0.70% |
| 2023 | 1,134 | +5.44% |
The 2006 population is for a smaller area of 2.94 km^{2}. Source:

Onehunga-Te Papapa Industrial had a population of 1,134 in the 2023 New Zealand census, an increase of 264 people (30.3%) since the 2018 census, and an increase of 294 people (35.0%) since the 2013 census. There were 570 males, 558 females and 9 people of other genders in 537 dwellings. 4.8% of people identified as LGBTIQ+. The median age was 34.8 years (compared with 38.1 years nationally). There were 198 people (17.5%) aged under 15 years, 225 (19.8%) aged 15 to 29, 570 (50.3%) aged 30 to 64, and 141 (12.4%) aged 65 or older.

People could identify as more than one ethnicity. The results were 50.3% European (Pākehā); 17.2% Māori; 23.3% Pasifika; 23.8% Asian; 3.4% Middle Eastern, Latin American and African New Zealanders (MELAA); and 2.4% other, which includes people giving their ethnicity as "New Zealander". English was spoken by 92.1%, Māori language by 1.6%, Samoan by 6.3%, and other languages by 23.3%. No language could be spoken by 2.9% (e.g. too young to talk). New Zealand Sign Language was known by 0.3%. The percentage of people born overseas was 38.1, compared with 28.8% nationally.

Religious affiliations were 40.5% Christian, 3.4% Hindu, 2.4% Islam, 0.8% Māori religious beliefs, 1.6% Buddhist, 0.5% New Age, 0.5% Jewish, and 1.6% other religions. People who answered that they had no religion were 43.4%, and 5.8% of people did not answer the census question.

Of those at least 15 years old, 345 (36.9%) people had a bachelor's or higher degree, 363 (38.8%) had a post-high school certificate or diploma, and 219 (23.4%) people exclusively held high school qualifications. The median income was $54,300, compared with $41,500 nationally. 135 people (14.4%) earned over $100,000 compared to 12.1% nationally. The employment status of those at least 15 was that 588 (62.8%) people were employed full-time, 66 (7.1%) were part-time, and 24 (2.6%) were unemployed.

== Foreshore ==
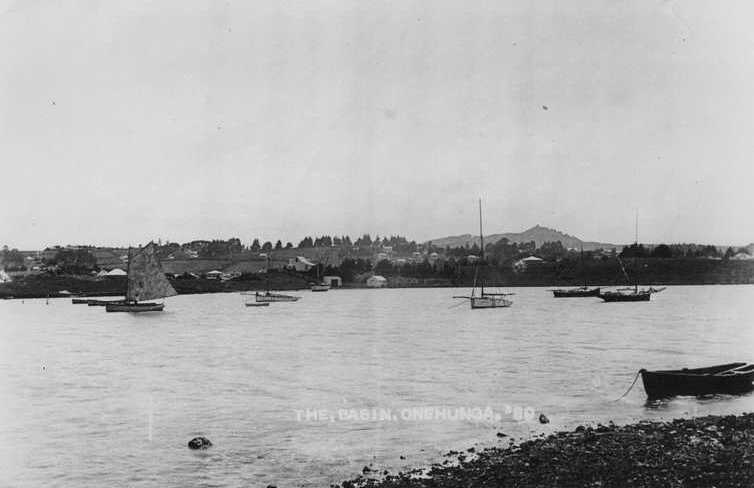
The Basin Onehunga, around 1889

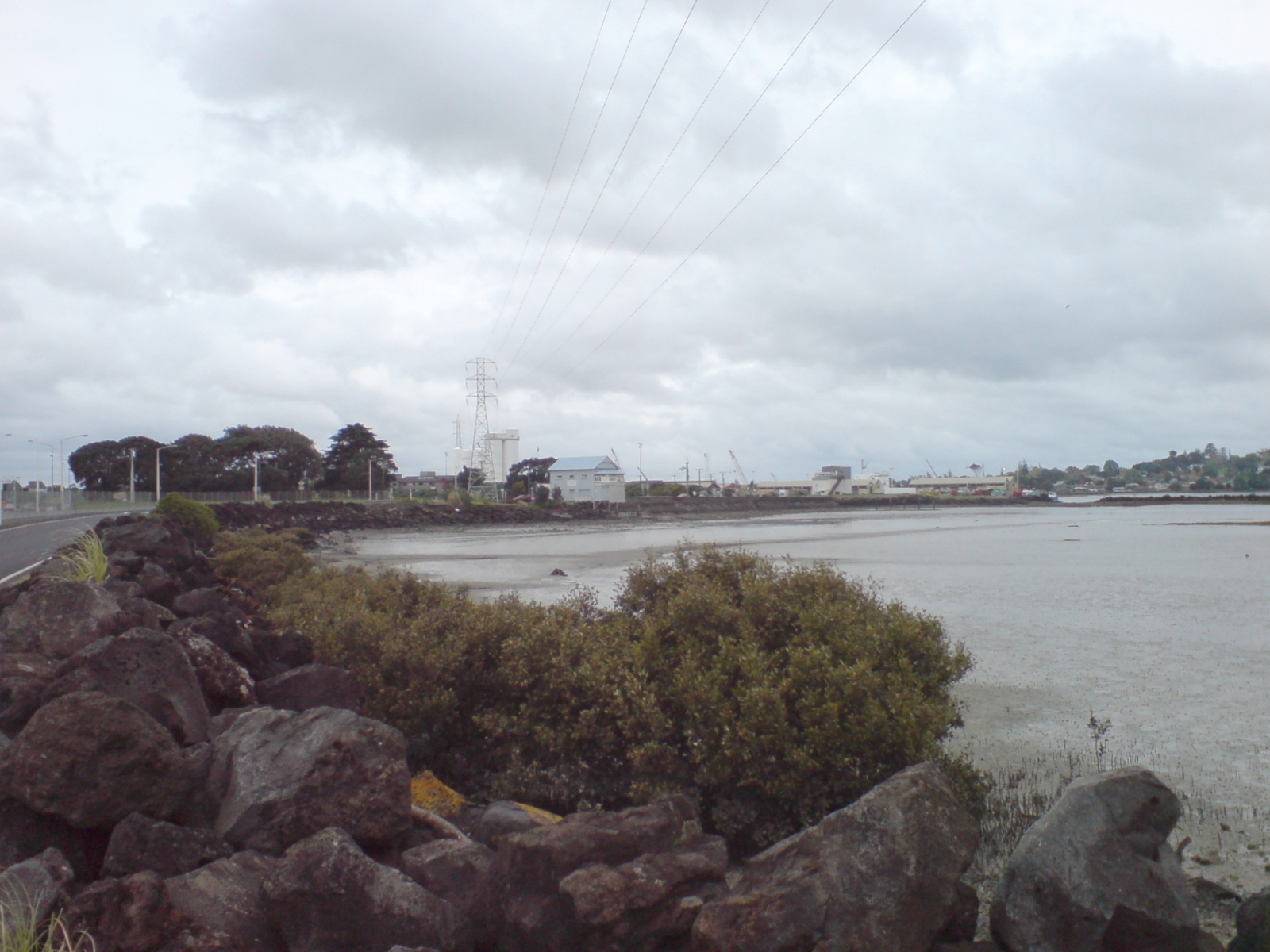
The current (2009) foreshore, dominated by man-made breakwaters and thus relatively inhospitable

Onehunga's shore has been heavily modified by human intervention. The old volcanic basin that used to link to the Manukau Harbour was filled in, with shorelines reclaimed and straightened for human use (Port of Onehunga, industrial uses and sports fields). The New Zealand State Highway 20 extension further disrupted Onehunga's connection to the shore in the 1970s.

This loss of amenity and space was one of the major complaints of local groups during negotiations over further motorway widening connected to the Māngere Bridge duplication. Proponents of a restored Onehunga Bay eventually won a $18 million commitment from Transit New Zealand (now NZ Transport Agency), which was topped up by a further $10 million from Auckland City Council. The sum is to fund a large-scale new shoreline west of the motorway, connected to downtown Onehunga with new pedestrian/cyclebridges, and creating 11ha of new beach and headland landscape. Three designs out of seven initial competitors were shortlisted for further work as of late 2009, and it was hoped to complete the restoration of the foreshore by mid-2014.

In mid-2011, the plans for the restoration works were clarified further, and provided for public comment, setting out a 6.4-hectare (16-acre) reclamation area with sanded beaches, new green open space and several new headlands. The area was to receive a new boat ramp, and walk and cycleways including a new walking and cycling bridge over the motorway to Onehunga. Construction started on 19 November 2012.

The newly named Taumanu Reserve was officially opened to the public on 14 November 2015, in an event attended by over a thousand people.

== Transport ==
Onehunga West Line rail services carry passengers between Onehunga and Henderson along the Onehunga Branch line to a junction with the main line at Penrose station. The Campaign for Better Transport campaigned to have the line extended south from Onehunga across the SH20 Manukau Harbour second crossing bridge to Auckland Airport. Former Auckland Mayor Len Brown also campaigned for this Auckland Airport Line, though it will likely only be developed after the City Rail Link is completed.

Electric services began running between Britomart and Onehunga on 28 April 2014.

Queen St, named in honour of Queen Victoria, led onto the 1920s Māngere Bridge and thence to the suburb of the same name. This was one of the main land routes south out of Auckland and the usual route to the airport until the motorway and regional road system in the 1970s diverted the through traffic away from the Onehunga and Mangere Bridge.

In 1973, Queen St was closed to through traffic, and on 2 April 1973 was renamed Onehunga Mall and reopened as a pedestrian shopping precinct. In 1996, Onehunga Mall was reopened to traffic.

Until 1956, a tram line ran all the way from the Auckland CBD to Onehunga.

== Notable buildings ==
Onehunga has a large amount of 19th-century and early 20th-century domiciles in its suburban streets. The town centre has several Heritage New Zealand registered buildings such as the Onehunga Blockhouse, Onehunga Primary School, and the Onehunga Carnegie Public Library.

=== Onehunga Post Office (former) ===
The Onehunga Post Office was built in 1901–2, in an Edwardian Baroque post office style, during a boom in post office construction throughout New Zealand in the early 20th century. Designed by Government Architect John Campbell, it is one of the earliest examples of the work of this prolific architect. Construction was completed on 3 February 1902, opening officially on 14 February 1902 and attended by a number of members of Parliament including Sir Joseph Ward. The building hosted essential public services such as mail, banking, and telegraph facilities. The former Post Office is located on the corner of Princes Street & Onehunga Mall Road (formerly Queen Street). By the 1990s the building was in disrepair and was to be demolished. Community consultation led to the building being refurbished in 1994–5. The building has since hosted multiple hospitality businesses. The Onehunga Post Office is the oldest surviving building in Onehunga's business district and was appointed a Heritage Place Category 2 in July 1993.

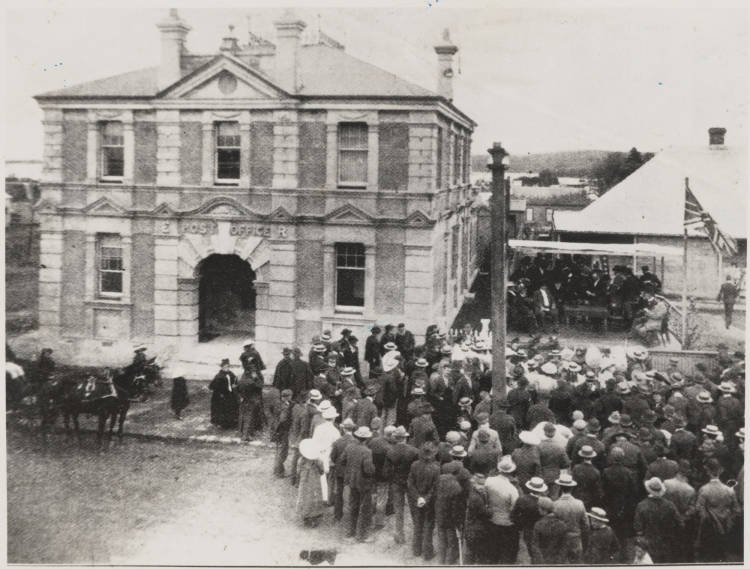
The opening of the new Onehunga Post Office, 1902

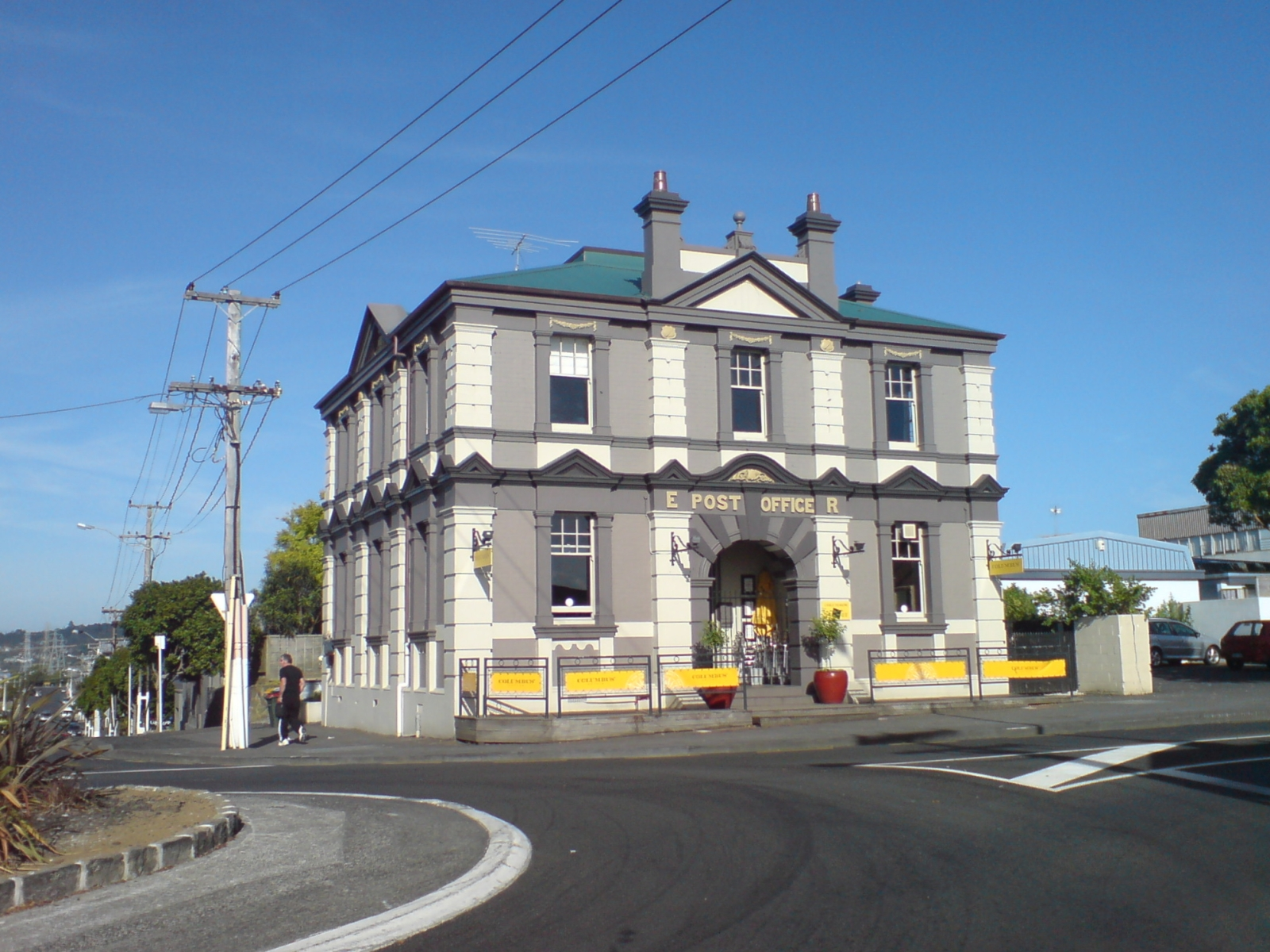
Former Onehunga Post Office, 2011

=== St Peter's Church ===
St Peter's Church is an Anglican church located on the corner of Onehunga Mall Road and Church Street. The Selwyn church built in 1848 has been relocated. The existing building dates from the 1980s and incorporates a gothic revival tower from the 1930s. The churchyard hosts the graves of many of Onehunga's early settlers including first woman Mayor of the British Empire, Elizabeth Yates and some of the bodies from the Wreck of the HMS Orpheus.

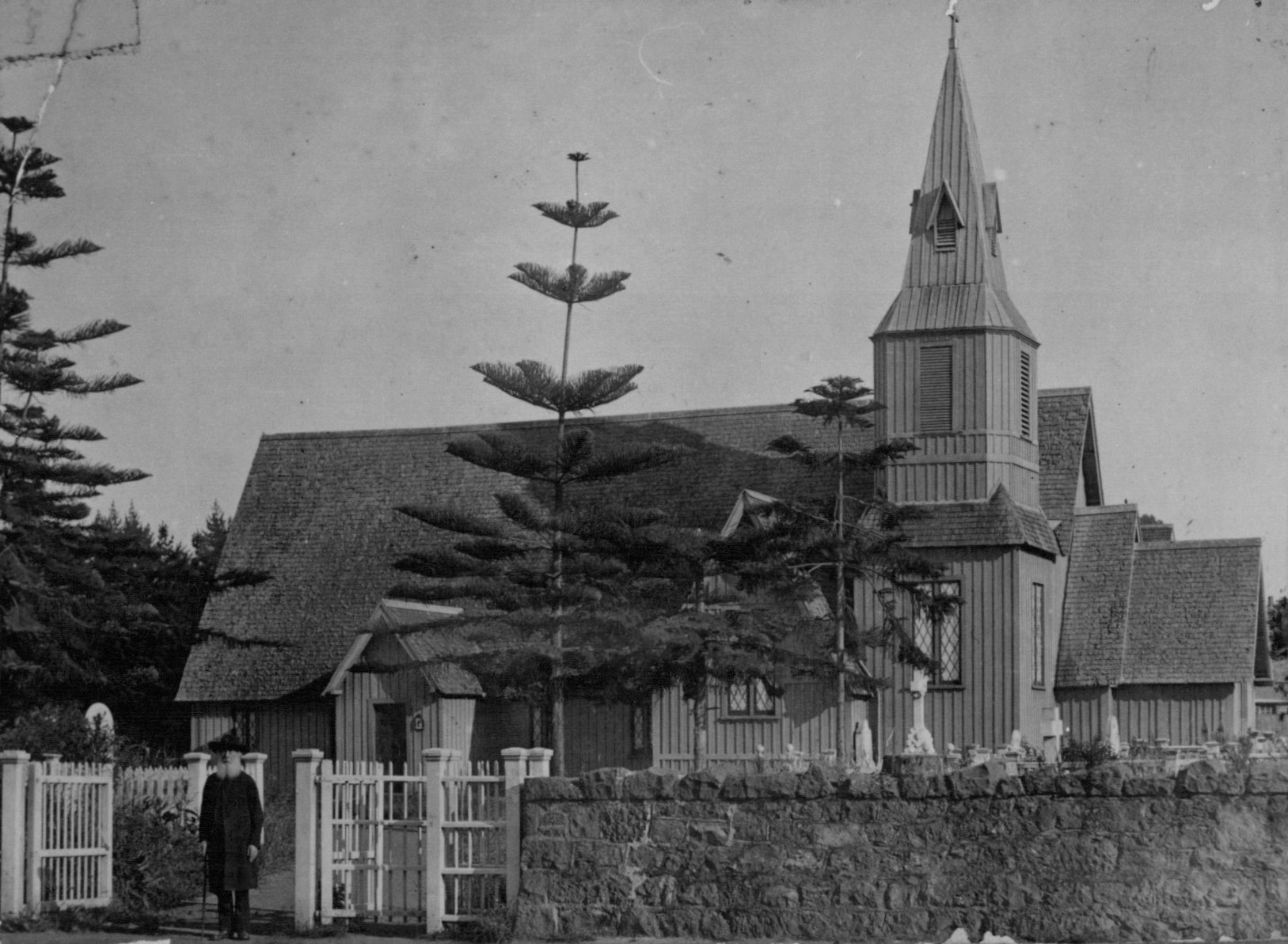
St Peter's Church, 1890s

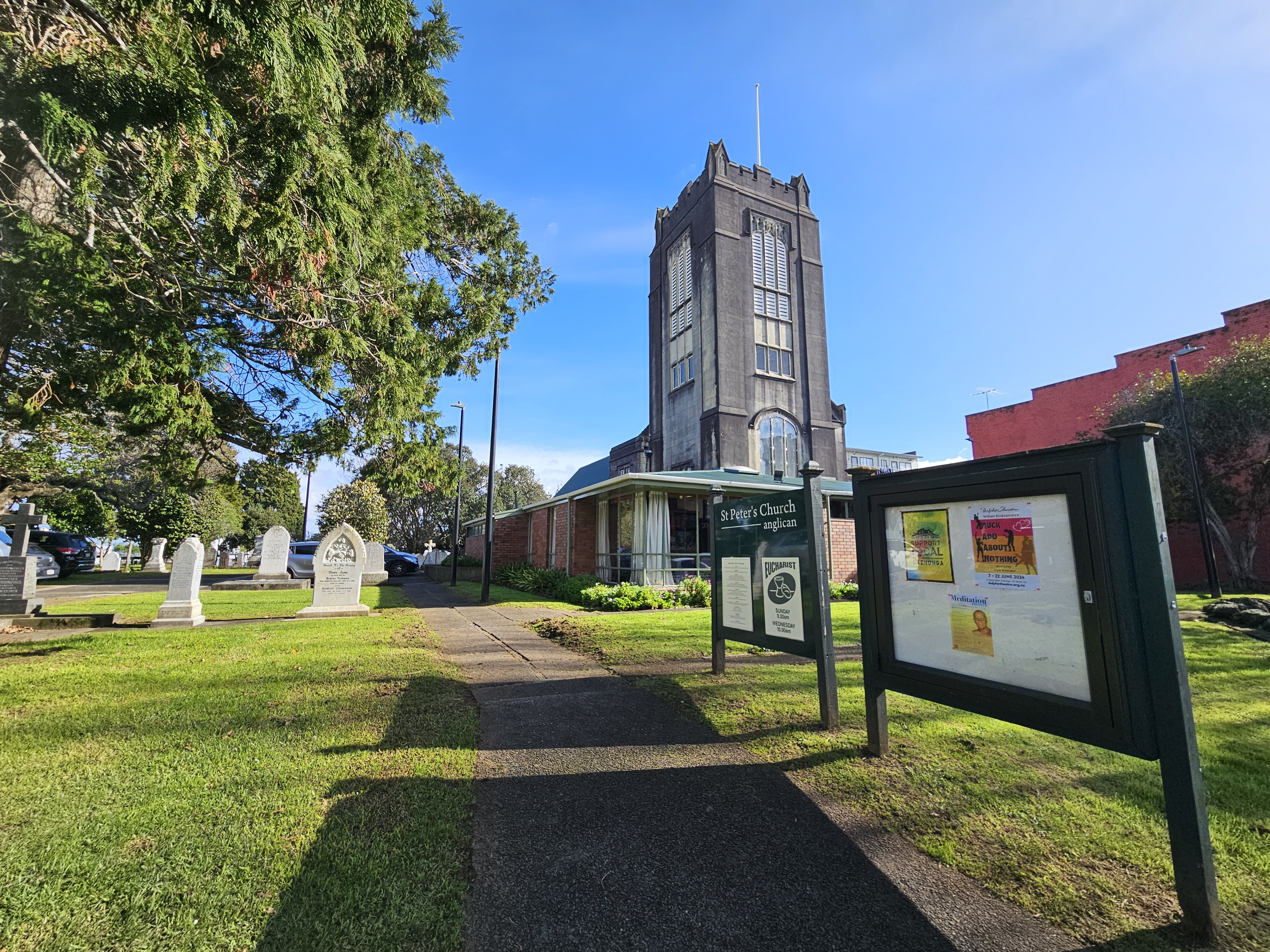
St Peter's Church, 2024

=== Carnegie Free Library (former) ===
Located on Princes Street, the Carnegie Free Library was built in 1911-12 and funded by American industrialist, Andrew Carnegie who supported the construction of free libraries throughout the world. It was one of eighteen in New Zealand built with his financial support. The building was designed by local Architect, John Park, who later served as Mayor of Onehunga. The classical Edwardian style building opened on 11 September 1912 and operated as a library for close to 60 years. In 1957, the name of the building was changed, with the word 'Free' being removed, it became known as the Onehunga Public Library. By 1967 the library moved to Church Street and the building was vacated. The building faced threats of demolition, with opposition from the local community. It was then purchased in 1988 and used as a community space until it was sold privately in 1998. Since then it has housed multiple restaurants and bars. In 1987 it was appointed a Historic Place Category 1 listing.

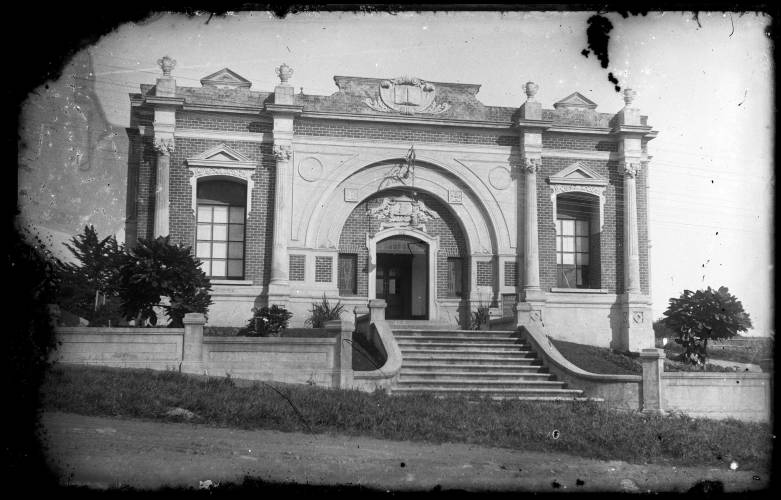
Carnegie Library, Onehunga 1912

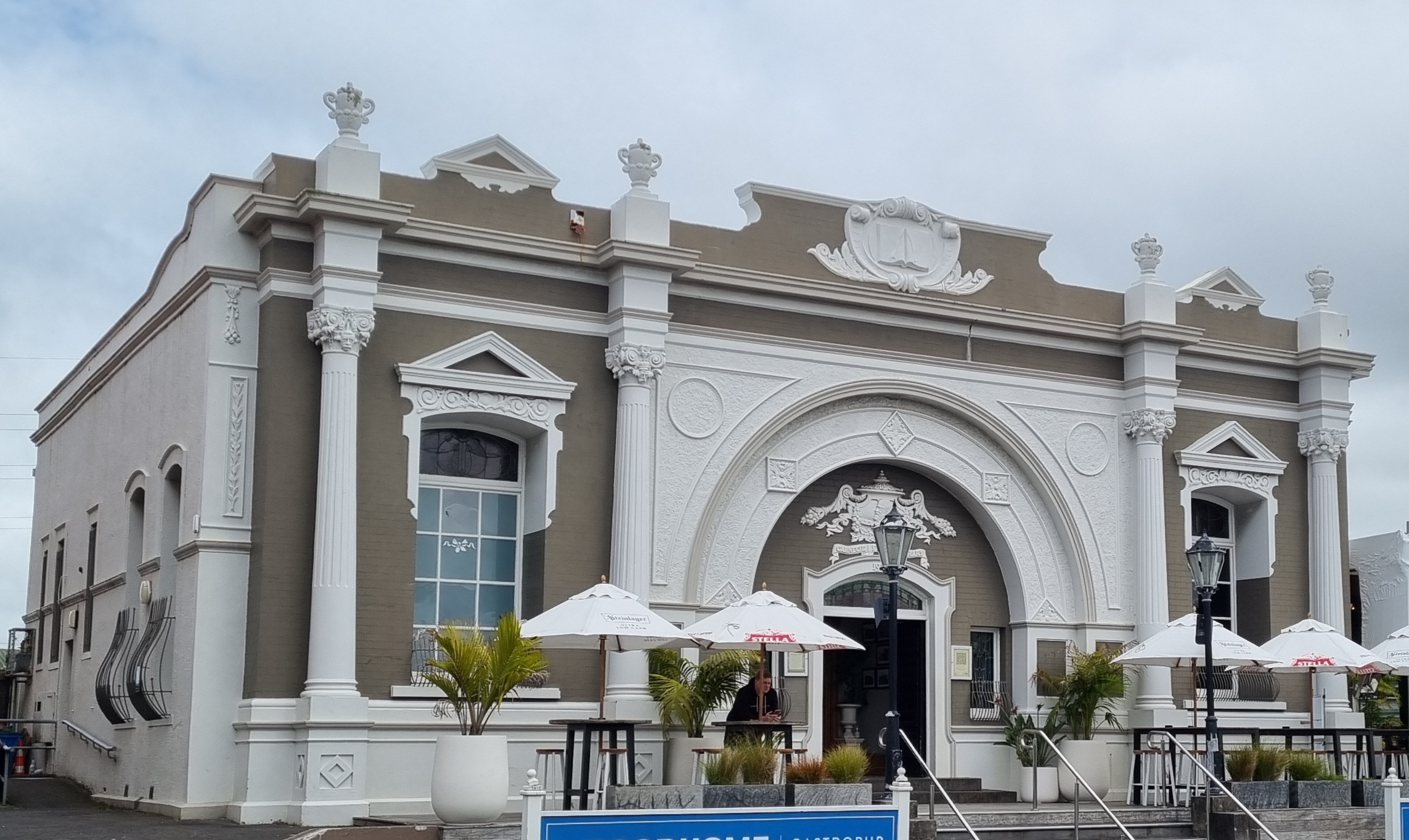
Carnegie Library building, 2023

=== Our Lady of the Assumption Church ===
Our Lady of the Assumption Church, located at the corner of Church & Galway Streets is a Roman Catholic church built between 1887 and 1889. It was designed by architect Thomas Mahoney in Gothic Revival style and built by local bricklayer William Kemp. Next to the church building is a denominational cemetery which contains the graves of many of Onehunga's early settlers. In 1983 it was appointed a Historic Place Category 2 listing.

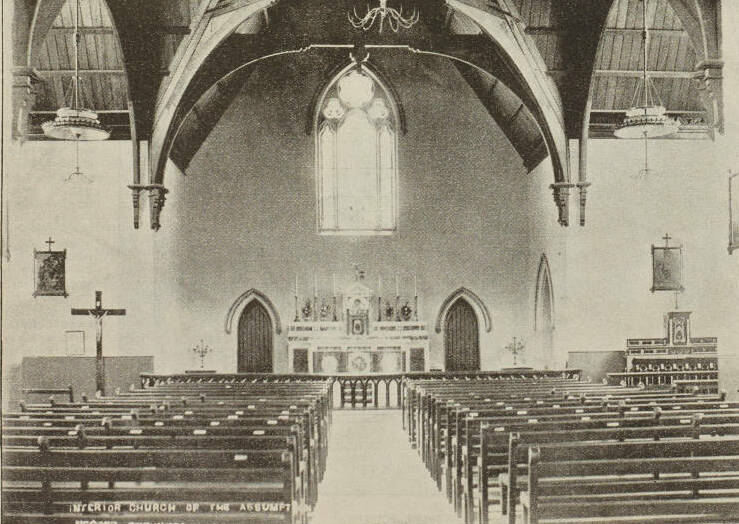
Interior of Our Lady of the Assumption in Onehunga, 1896

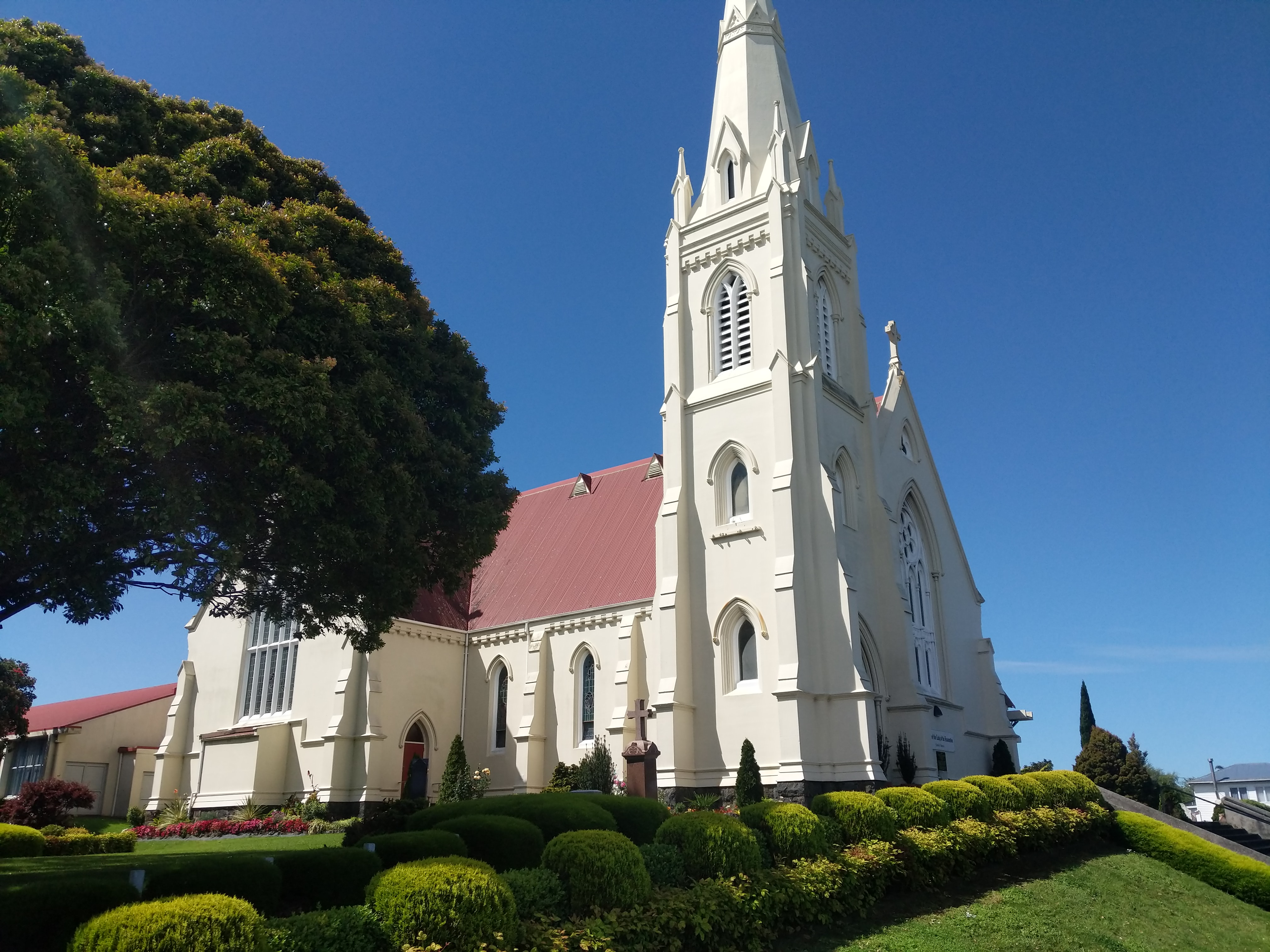
Church of Our Lady of the Assumption, 2020

=== The Landing (formerly The Manukau Hotel) ===
The Landing is located at 2 Onehunga Harbour Road. It was built in 1865 by George Hodge, to accommodate passengers arriving to the Onehunga Wharf. It was known as the Manukau Hotel and was owned by Captain Henry Hardington from 1874. In June 1879, the hotel burnt down. A new hotel designed by architect James Wrigley, opened in December 1879 on the same site. The building has seen significant alteration since its construction, both in 1892 by J. Huntley Allen and by Charles Arnold in 1906. It has been in continuous use as a hotel and public house since its reconstruction in 1879. It now operates as a restaurant and is widely recognised as a historical and social landmark of the area.

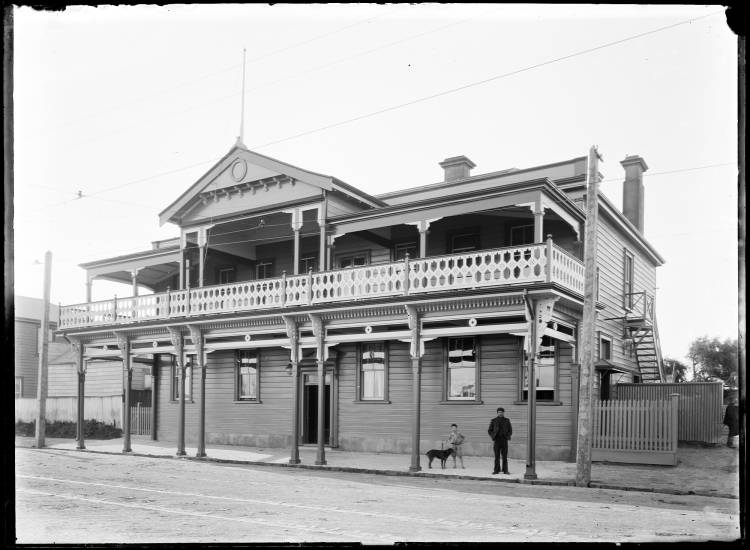
Manukau Hotel Onehunga, 1900s

=== Arch of Remembrance ===
The Arch of Remembrance, is located in Jellicoe Park on Quadrant Road & Grey Street. The park was opened in 1923 by the Governor General, Lord Jellicoe, and is the site of Onehunga's Public Swimming Pools which opened in 1956. The Arch of Remembrance was officially unveiled on 20 October 1929 as a memorial for WWI and WWII. It is made from locally sourced scoria and its initial construction was overseen by John Park. Since its inception it has served as a commemorative site for the local community.

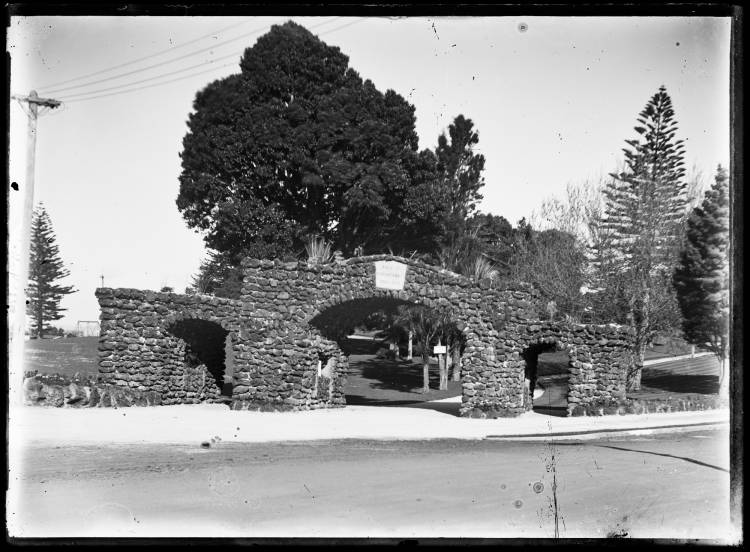
The Arch of Remembrance at the entrance to Jellicoe Park in Onehunga.

=== Onehunga Blockhouse ===
Onehunga Blockhouse is a brick building relocated from Princes St, built in 1860 as a defense strong post during the New Zealand Wars, it is currently owned by the Onehunga Fencible and Historical Society.

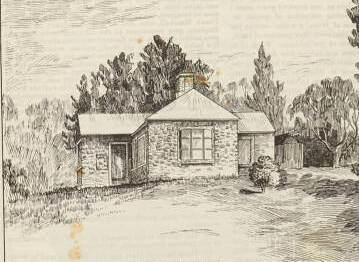
Sketch of Onehunga Blockhouse, 1892

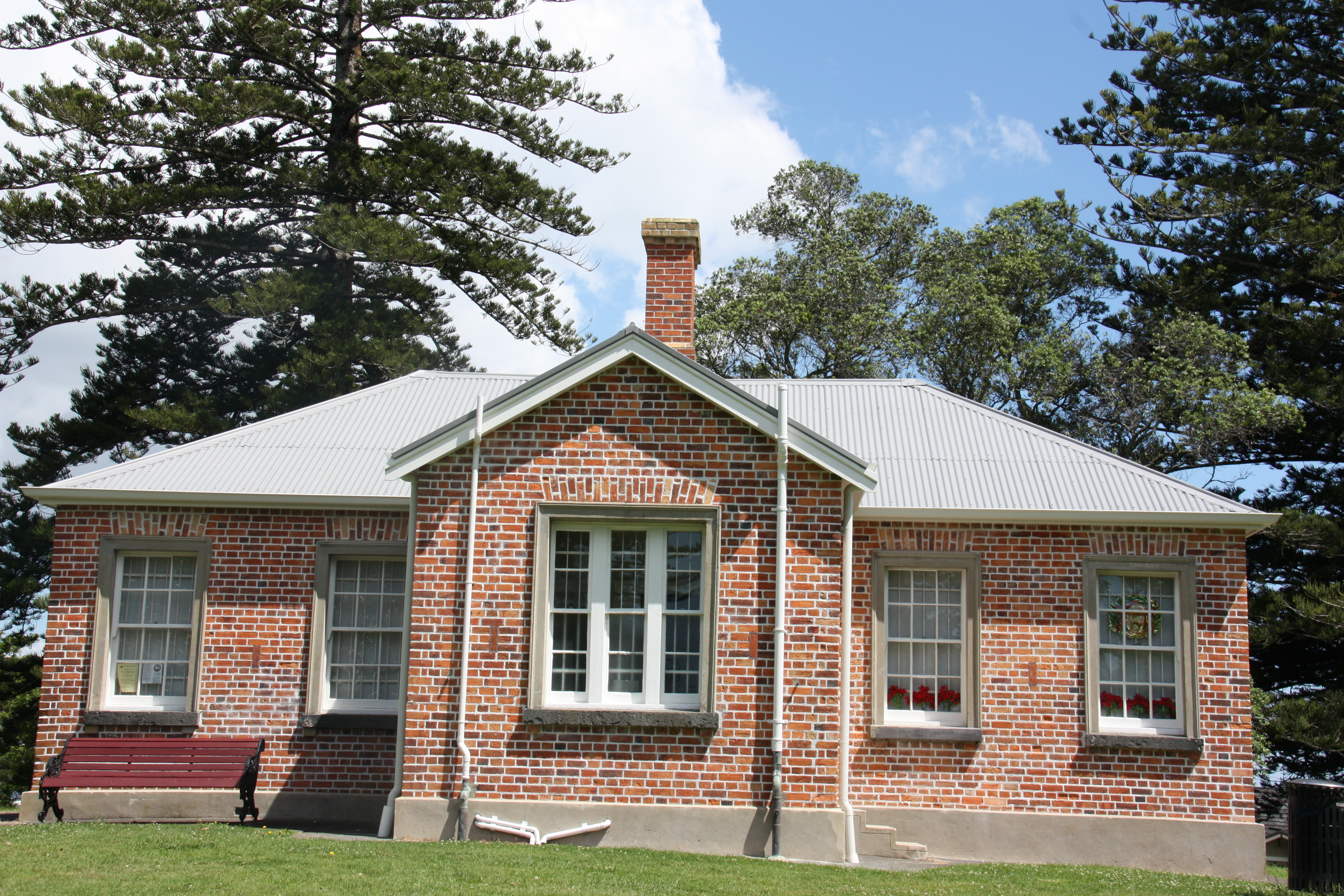
Front of the Onehunga Blockhouse, 2024

=== Journey's End (replica) ===
Journeys End is a replica of a 1850 wooden Fencible cottage, opened in 1959 and moved to its current site in 1969.

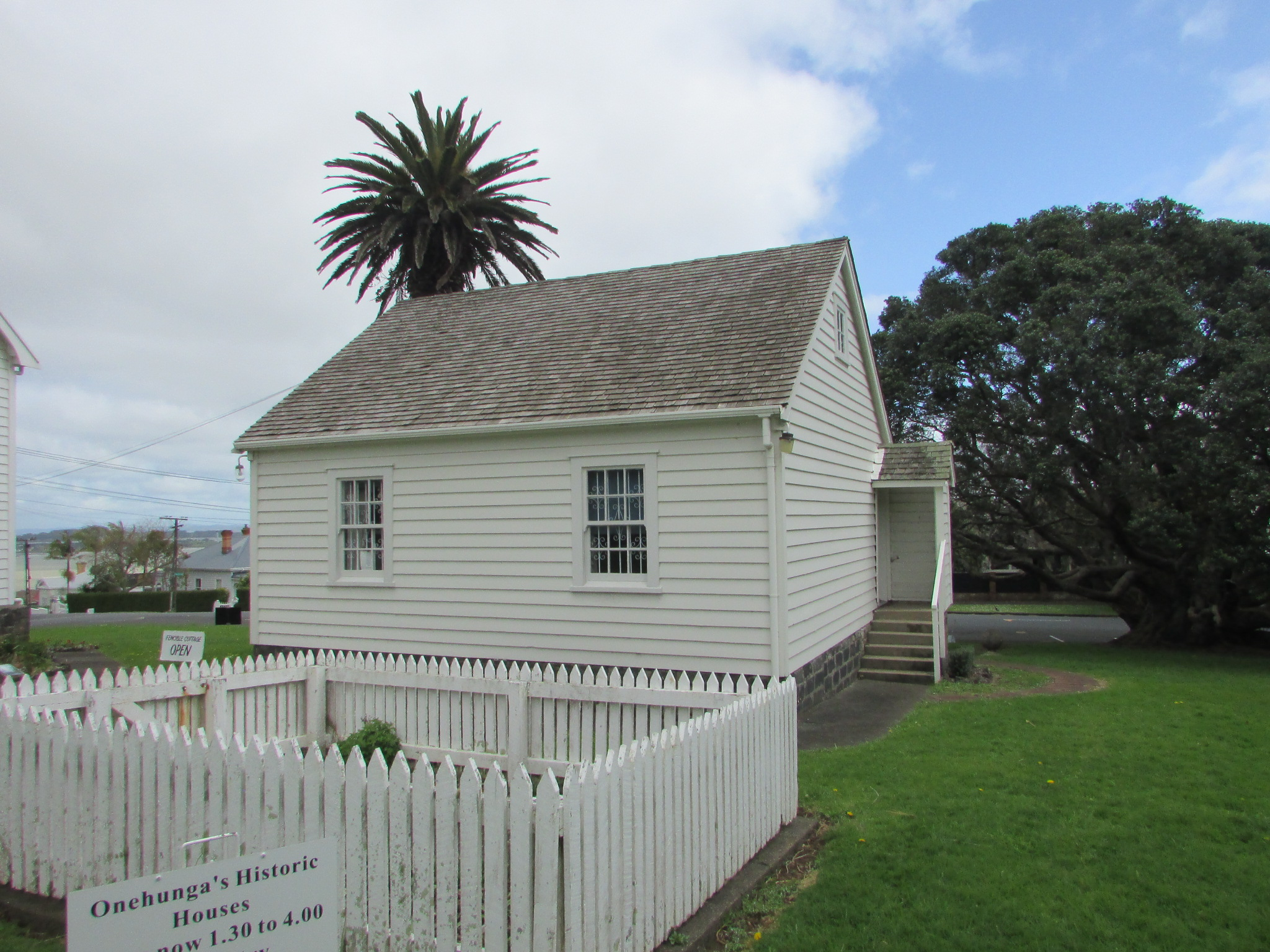
Journey's End, 2024

=== Laishley House ===
Laishley House was built in 1859–60 as a manse for the congregational church, at 44 Princes Street and later relocated to Jellicoe Park in 1985. Rev. Richard Laishley, was the first minister of the church, whom the house is named after.

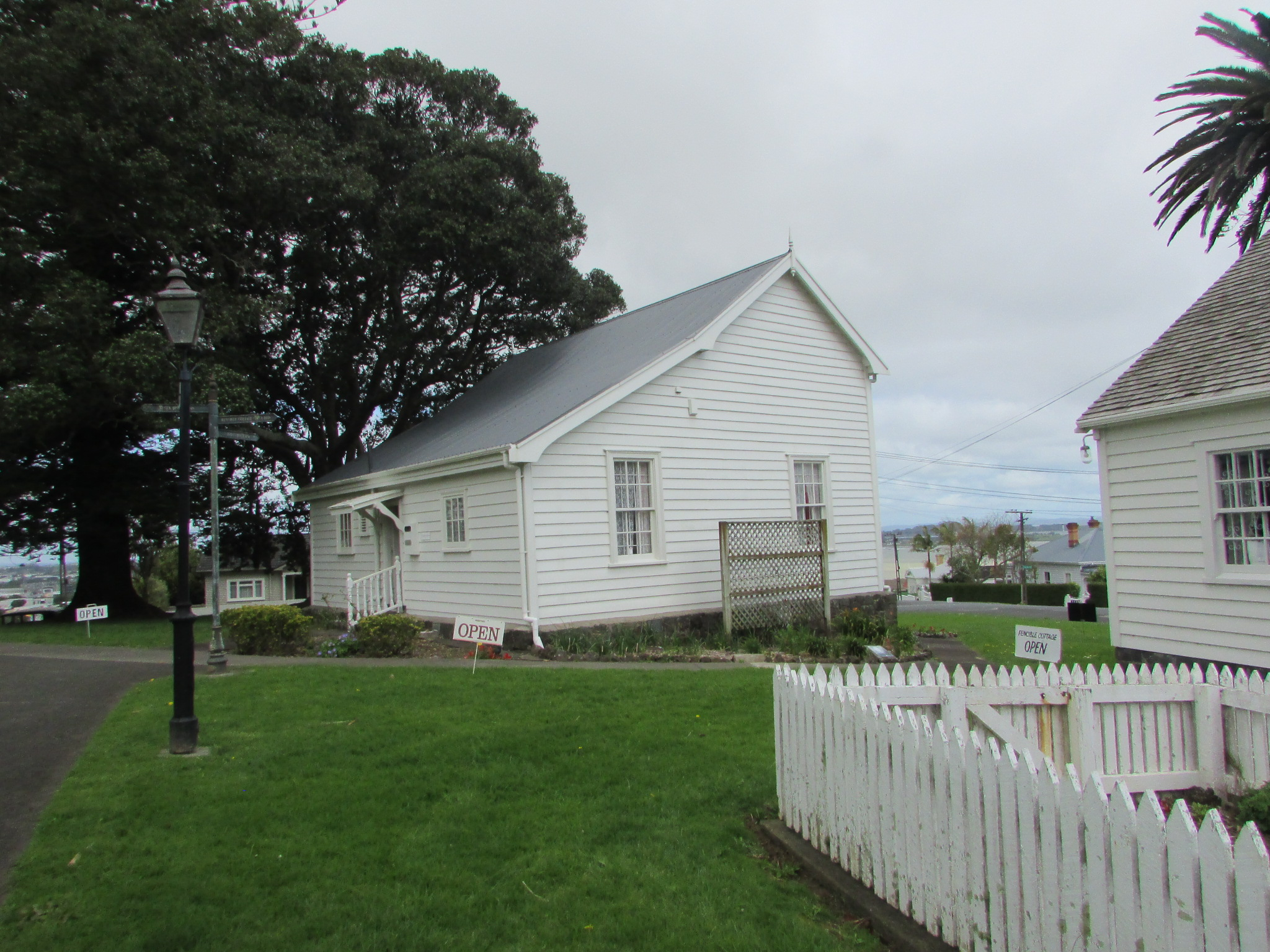
Laishley House, 2024

=== Manukau Yacht and Motor Boat Club (formerly) ===
Located on Onehunga Harbour Road, the now, Aotea Sea Scout Den, was built in 1911 by John Park for the Manukau Yacht and Motor Boat Club. The building was taken over by the Aotea Sea Scouts in 1977. It is noted to be one of the oldest remaining yacht clubs in New Zealand.

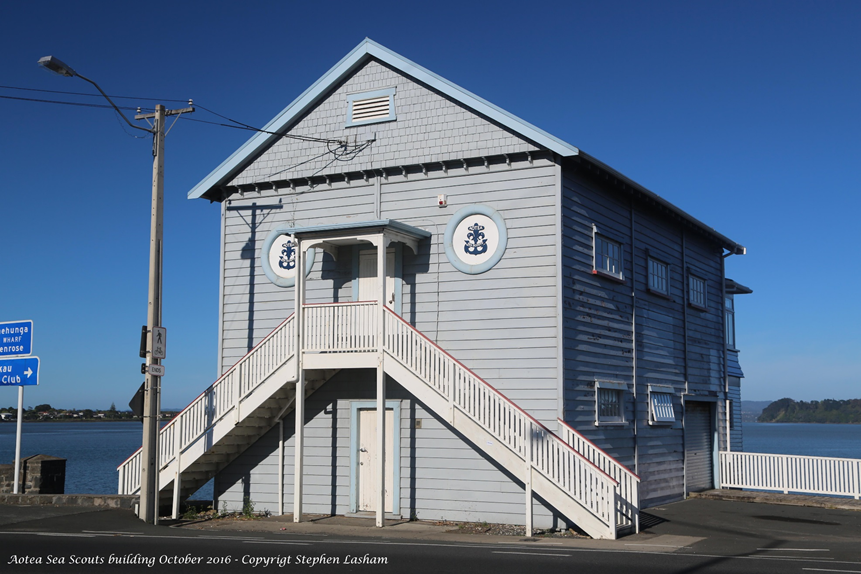
Aotea Sea Scouts Den, 2016

=== Onehunga Primary School (formerly) ===
The former Onehunga Primary School was opened on 20 November 1901. The building was constructed by G M Hancock and designed by architects to the Auckland Education Board, John Mitchell and Robert Watt. Made from native kauri, in a Queen Anne Revival style, the building served as a school for 80 years and from 1981 used as a community space. It is listed as a Historic Place Category 1.

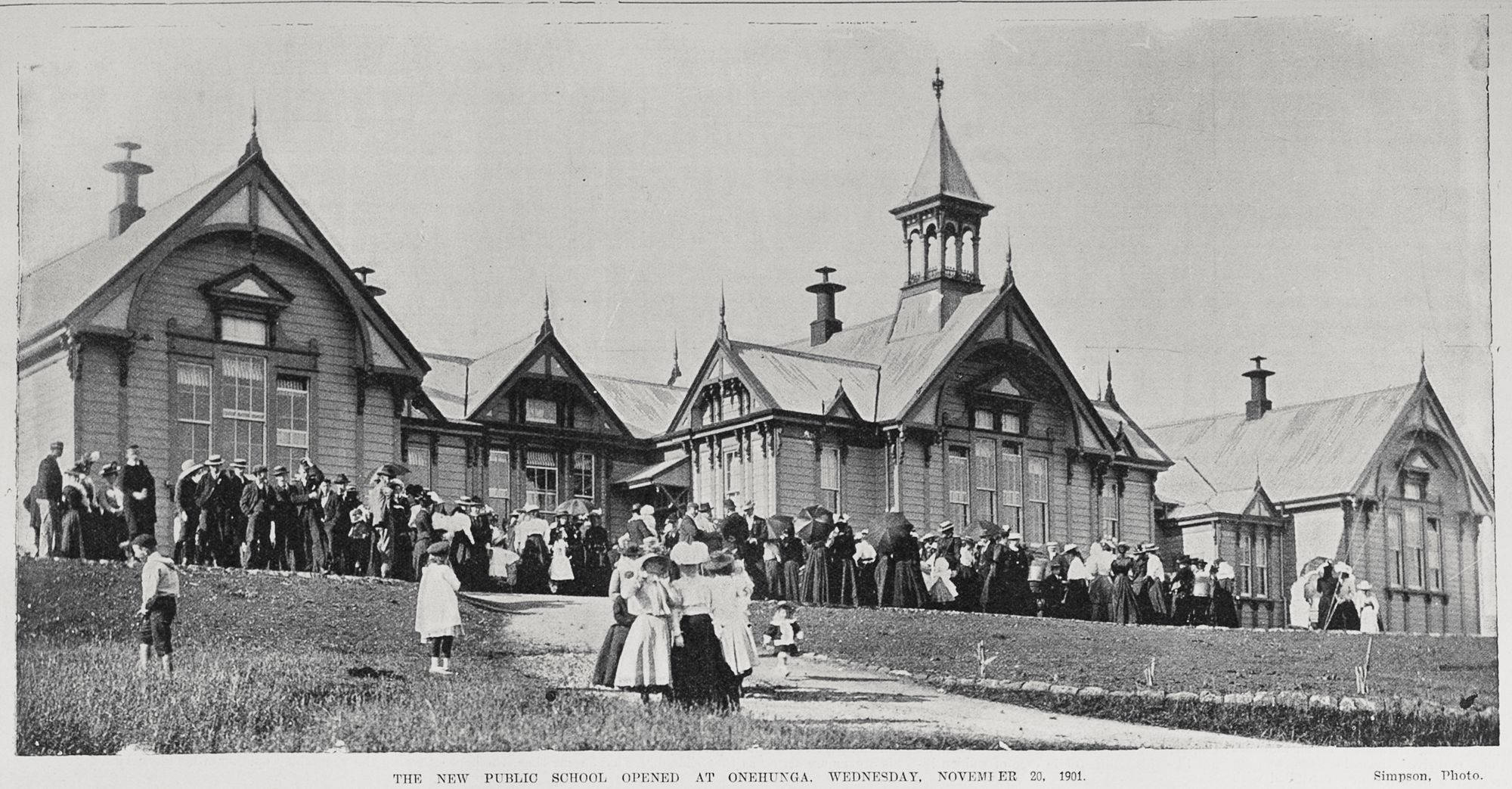
The opening of the new school in Onehunga, November 20, 1901

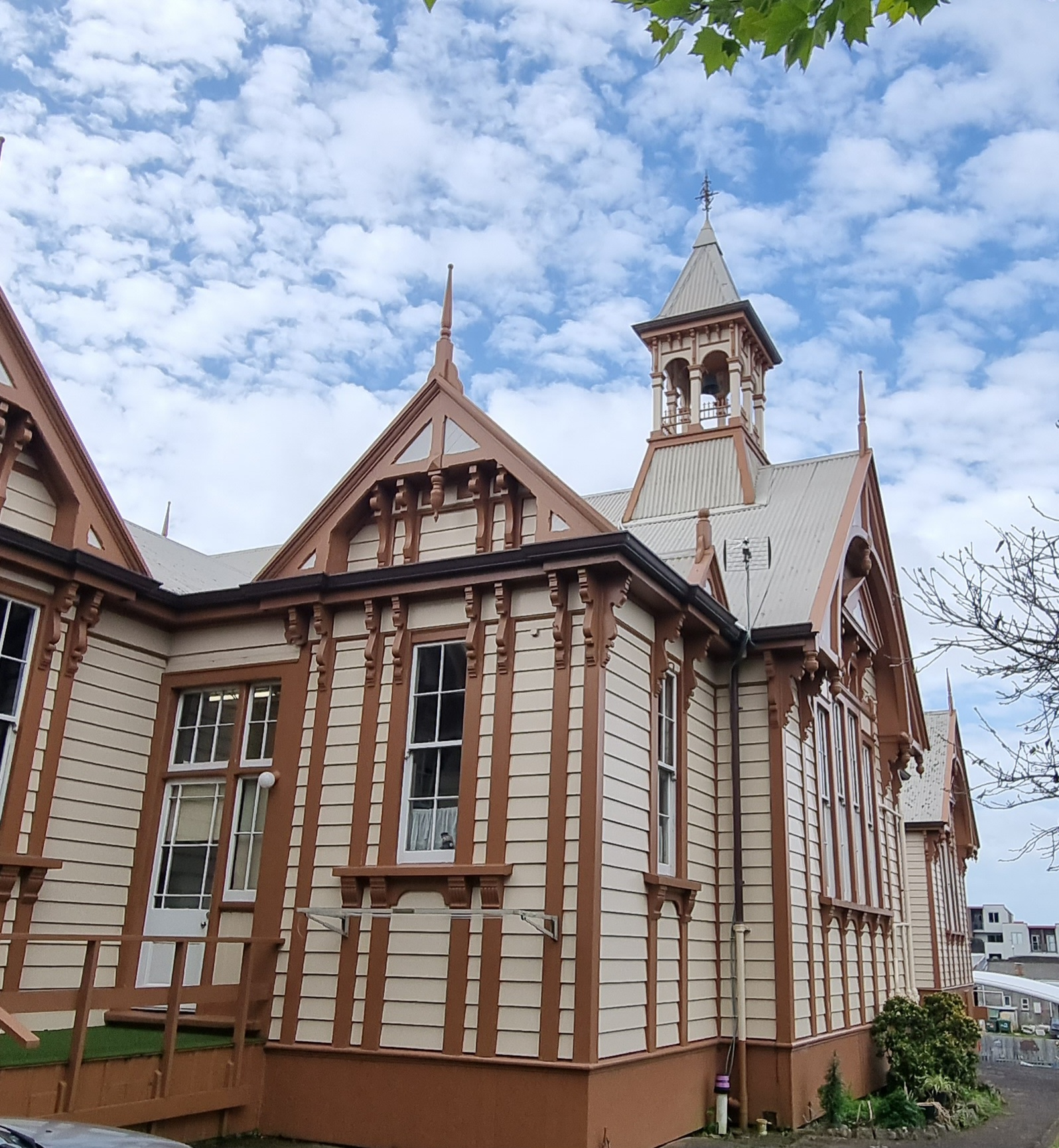
Onehunga Primary School (Former), 2023

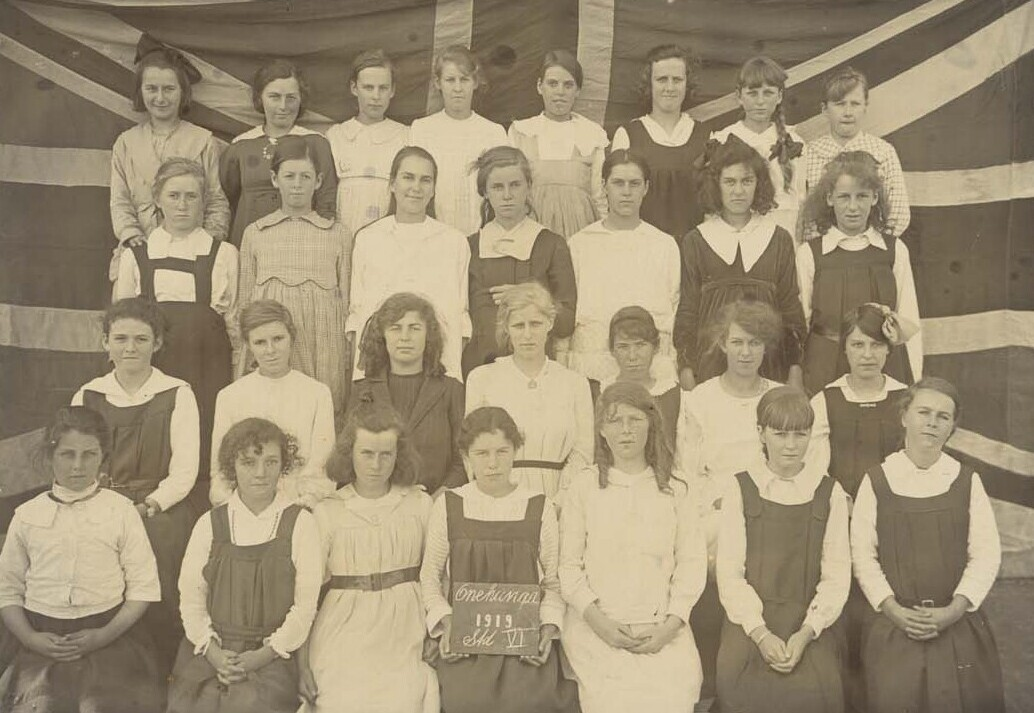
Onehunga Primary School Students, 1919

=== Onehunga Railway Station ===
The former Onehunga Railway Station building, is now relocated to 38 Alfred Street serves as headquarters of the Railway Enthusiasts Society Inc. It was built in 1873. As one of the first train stations to be built under the Vogel Railway Acts of 1870s New Zealand.

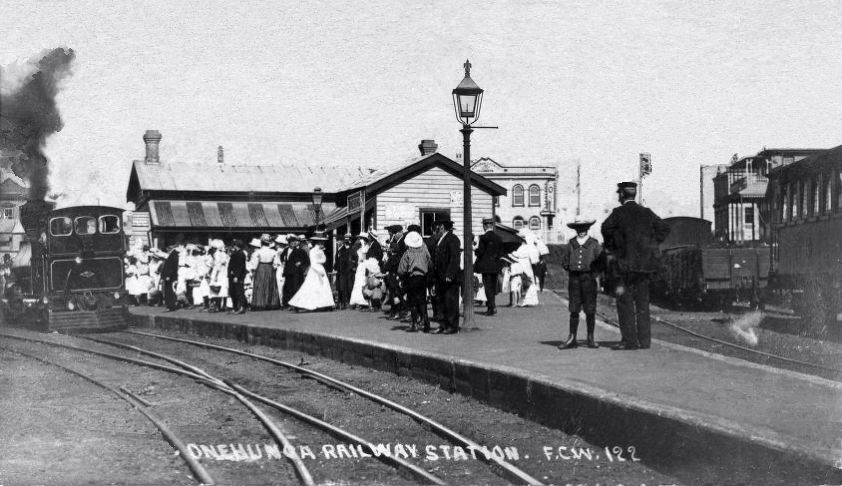
The train station at Onehunga, sometime in the second half of the 19th Century.

== Commerce ==
Dress Smart Auckland opened in Onehunga in 1995, and expanded in 2005. It now covers an area of 13,217 m^{2}, with up to 101 tenancies and 735 carparks.

== Education ==
The first school in Onehunga was an Anglican school established in 1847. Further church and private schools were established over the years. In 1873 the first public school—the Onehunga District School— opened in Onehunga and by 1876 this had moved to Selwyn Street. Following the growth of both Onehunga and education in New Zealand the school expanded and in 1899 added an infant block. The Auckland Education Board decided to construct a senior block on the most northern part of the site. The new school building opened on 20 November 1901 and taught up to standard seven. In July 1903 the Onehunga District High School was opened. This became the largest high school in Auckland Province with some students travelling from as far as Point Chevalier and Pukekohe. The school had reached maximum capacity by August 1904. In 1912 the district high school was closed down and the school reverted to an up to standard seven district school. In 1982 the primary school moved out of the historic schoolhouse and onto a new site.

Onehunga High School is a secondary school (years 9–13) with a roll of 1,010 students.

Onehunga Primary School is a contributing primary school (years 1–6) with a roll of 426 students.

St Joseph's Catholic School is a state-integrated full primary school (years 1–8) with a roll of 168 students.

Golden Grove School is a private Montessori full primary school (years 1–8) with a roll of 50 students.

All these schools are coeducational. Rolls are as of July 2026.

== Sport ==
Waikaraka Park Speedway is a motorcycle speedway venue in Waikaraka Park, on 175-243 Neilson Street. The venue has hosted important events, including the North Island final round of the Speedway World Championship in 1992.

== Notable people ==
- Annie Christina Morrison, first headmistress of Epsom Girls' Grammar School.
- Bruce Cathie (1930-2013), National Airways Corporation pilot and ufologist
- Margaret Beveridge Stevenson (1865–1941), a New Zealand Baháʼí
