= Arthur Watson (cricketer, born 1866) =

English cricketer

Personal information
- Full name: Arthur Lacon Watson
- Born: 27 August 1866; Northwood, Isle of Wight, England
- Died: 28 June 1955 (aged 88); Wootton Bridge, Isle of Wight, England
- Batting: Right-handed
- Bowling: Right-arm fast-medium
- Relatives: Arthur Watson (father)

Domestic team information
- Years: Team
- 1885–1893: Hampshire
- 1888: Cambridge University

Career statistics
Competition	First-class
Matches	2
Runs scored	26
Batting average	6.50
100s/50s	–/–
Top score	22
Catches/stumpings	–/–
- Source: Cricinfo, 19 January 2010

Arthur Lacon Watson (27 August 1866 — 28 June 1955) was an English first-class cricketer.

The son of the Reverend Arthur Watson, he was born in Northwood, Isle of Wight, in August 1866. He was educated at Winchester College, after which he matriculated at Trinity College, Cambridge. In the same year that he matriculated, Watson made a single appearance in first-class cricket for Hampshire against Sussex at Southampton. While studying at Cambridge, he also made one first-class appearance for the Cambridge University Cricket Club against Surrey at The Oval in 1888. In his two first-class matches, he scored 26 runs with a high score of 22. After graduating from Cambridge, Watson became an assistant master at Narborough in Leicestershire, before becoming a private tutor. Watson died on the Isle of Wight at Wootton Bridge in June 1955.
