= Arthur Watson (cricketer, born 1835) =

English cricketer and schoolmaster

Personal information
- Full name: Arthur Watson
- Born: 23 October 1835; Lancing, Sussex, England
- Died: 31 March 1920 (aged 84); Cowes, Isle of Wight, England
- Batting: Unknown
- Bowling: Unknown
- Relatives: Arthur Watson (son)

Domestic team information
- Years: Team
- 1858: Cambridge University

Career statistics
Competition	First-class
Matches	1
Runs scored	0
Batting average	0.00
100s/50s	–/–
Top score	0
Balls bowled	?
Wickets	1
Bowling average	?
5 wickets in innings	–
10 wickets in match	–
Best bowling	1/?
Catches/stumpings	–/–
- Source: Cricinfo, 16 November 2022

Arthur Watson (24 October 1835 – 31 March 1920) was an English schoolmaster. As a student in 1858 at Cambridge University, he played in a single first-class cricket match for the university side. He was born at Lancing, Sussex and died at Cowes, Isle of Wight.

The son of the vicar of Lancing, Watson was educated at the innovative Clapham Grammar School in south London under the headmastership of Charles Pritchard and at Gonville and Caius College, Cambridge. His cricket career was brief: records survive only for matches he played in the 1858 season, plus a single later game in 1865, and only one somewhat-truncated match was later rated as first-class. In it, he played as a lower-order batsman and as a bowler, taking one wicket, though neither his bowling nor his batting styles are known.

Watson graduated from Cambridge University with a Bachelor of Arts degree in 1859, and this converted to a Master of Arts in 1863. He was ordained as a Church of England deacon in 1862 and as a priest the following year; in 1862 he became curate of Neston, Cheshire. Rather than pursuing a career in the church, however, Watson went into education, and in 1863 he returned to his own school, Clapham Grammar, as an assistant master and chaplain. In 1864, he married the daughter of a clergyman from Cowes on the Isle of Wight and from then until his death in 1920 he was headmaster of the Grange School at Cowes.

Watson's son, Arthur Lacon Watson, had a similarly brief first-class cricket career for Hampshire and Cambridge University in the 1880s.
