= Arthur Watson (footballer, born 1913) =

English footballer

Personal information
- Date of birth: 12 July 1913
- Place of birth: South Hiendley, Yorkshire, England
- Date of death: 1995 (aged 81–82)
- Place of death: Hull, Yorkshire, England
- Height: 5 ft 11 1/2 in (1.82 m)
- Position: Full back

Senior career*
Years	Team	Apps	(Gls)
–	Monckton Colliery Welfare		
1934–1936	Lincoln City	37	(0)
1936–1939	Chesterfield	10	(0)
1939–1947	Hull City	35	(2)
- * Club domestic league appearances and goals

Arthur E. Watson (12 July 1913 – 1995) was an English footballer who made 82 appearances in the Football League playing as a full back for Lincoln City, Chesterfield and Hull City.
