= Mayor of Onehunga =

The Mayor of Onehunga officiated over the Onehunga Borough of New Zealand, which was administered by the Onehunga Borough Council. The office existed from 1877 until 1989, when Onehunga Borough was amalgamated into the new Auckland City Council as part of the 1989 local government reforms. There were 24 holders of the office.

In 1894, Elizabeth Yates was elected Mayor of Onehunga, becoming the first female mayor in the British Empire and the second in the world.

== List of mayors ==
Mayors of Onehunga were:

Key

Labour

	Name	Term
1	John Dickenson Jackson	1877
2	James William Waller	1877–1878
3	Thomas George Blakey	1878–1879
4	George Codlin	1879–1880
(3)	Thomas George Blakey	1880–1881
(4)	George Codlin	1881–1883
5	William George Scott	1883–1884
(1)	John Dickenson Jackson	1884–1885
(5)	William George Scott	1885–1886
6	Robert Close Erson	1886–1887
7	Charles Colville Fleming	1887–1888
8	Michael Yates	1888–1892
(6)	Robert Close Erson	1892–1893
9	Elizabeth Yates	1893–1894
10	Donald Sutherland	1894–1897
11	Frederick William Court	1897–1898
(6)	Robert Close Erson	1898–1901
(10)	Donald Sutherland	1901–1904
12	Angus Gordon	1905–1906
13	John Rowe	1906–1917
14	John James Boyd	1917
15	John Stoupe	1917–1919
16	John Park	1919–1923
17	James Edward Cowell	1923–1927
18	William Charles Coldicutt	1927–1929
19	Edward Morton	1929–1935
(16)	John Park	1935–1938
20	Archer Garside	1938–1941
(16)	John Park	1941–1944
(20)	Archer Garside	1944–1959
21	Leo Manning	1959–1968
22	Gerrard Beeson	1968–1974
(21)	Leo Manning	1974–1980
23	John Henderson	1980–1986
24	Graham Johnson Mountjoy	1986–1989
