= St Bride's Church, Mauku =

1861 Anglican church in New Zealand

St Bride's Church
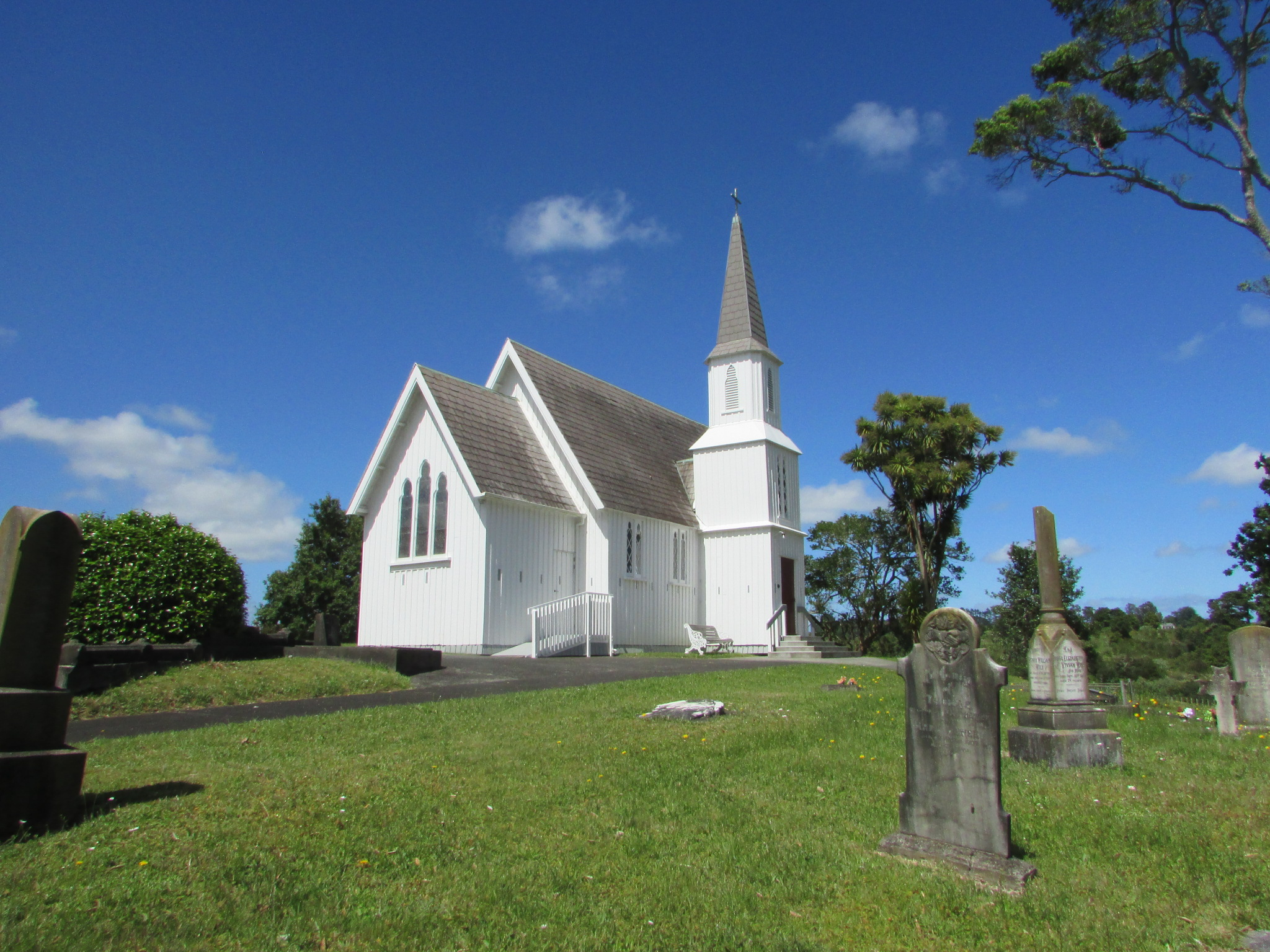
- St Bride's Church, loopholes can be see along the walls of the church
- 37.2013°S 174.8120°E
- Location: Mauku
- Address: Findlay Road, Mauku
- Country: New Zealand
- Denomination: Anglican
- Website: stbridesmauku.wordpress.com

History
- Founded: 1861
- Consecrated: 22 February 1885

Architecture
- Architect: Reverend Arthur Guyon Purchas
- Style: Selwyn style (Gothic Revival)
- Years built: 1860–1861
- Groundbreaking: 1860
- Construction cost: c.£300

Administration
- District: Parochial District of Waiuku
- Diocese: Anglican Diocese of Auckland
- Parish: Parish of Mauku

Heritage New Zealand – Category 1
- Designated: 2 February 1990
- Reference no.: 81

St Bride's Church is an historic Anglican church in Mauku, New Zealand. Constructed in 1861, St Bride's was the first church in the Franklin area. It served as an important military outpost during the Invasion of the Waikato. The church was consecrated in 1885 and has a category 1 listing with Heritage New Zealand.

== Description ==
St Bride's sits atop an elevated site; this along with its spire helps it stand out as a landmark. The church is a tōtara Selwyn-style church and follows traditional ecclesiological design philosophies in its proportions. The church has exposed rafters and trusses and is mostly constructed from kauri, with tōtara for the rest. Two original oil lamps are located in the interior. The cusped diamond pane windows have trefoils that are in pairs of twos except for the chancel where they are pairs of three. The belfry has louvered windows that also have trefoils. The church is designed as a replica of a church in North Devon, England. The porch and vestry are located opposite. The nave is 40 ft (12 m) by 25 ft (7.6 m) and lacks aisles and transepts, the chancel is 12 ft (3.7 m) by 14 ft (4.3 m), and the porch is 8–9 sq ft (0.74–0.84 m^{2}). The tower is located above the porch and is just under 20 m (66 ft) high. The position of the porch results in the entrance to the church being at the side and under the tower instead of a more typical entrance at the front of a church.

== History ==
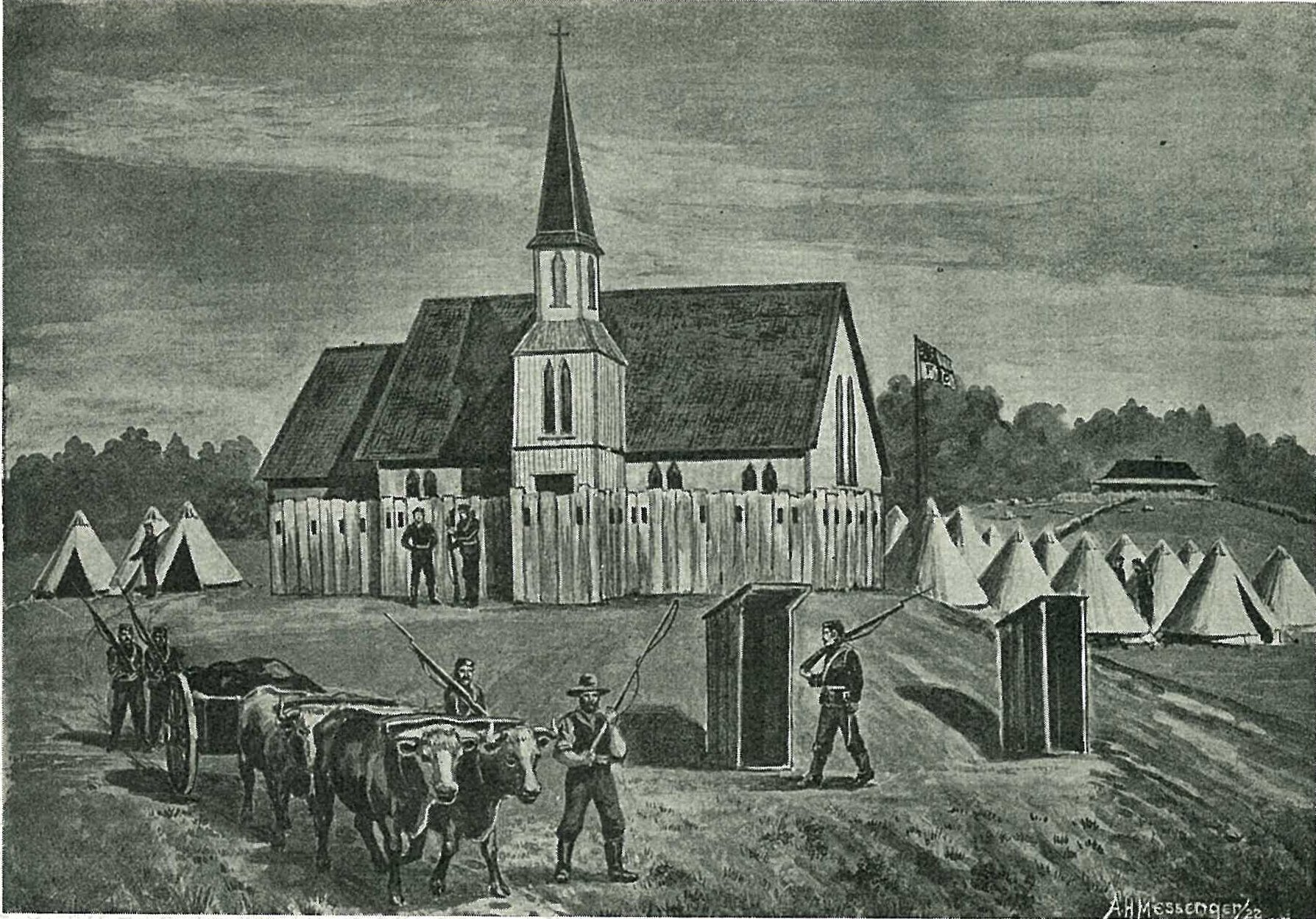
An illustration depicting St Bride's Church in 1863 with stockade surrounding it

Anglican worship in the inchoate settlement of Mauku was initially conducted in private homes and later in a slab hut near the site of St Bride's. Prior to the construction of St Bride's Church — Mauku was visited by George Augustus Selwyn, Robert Maunsell, John Coleridge Patteson, and Arthur Guyon Purchas, who all provided services at different times. On 22 November 1858 it was decided a permanent church should be constructed and a committee was formed, headed by Dr. Purchas. An area of 3 acres (1.2 ha) was given to Selwyn as a Crown grant for the construction of a church. Dr. Purchas offered to donate £25 towards a spire if the committee chose his design, which they did. Significant contributions were also made by Gore Browne, Bishop Selwyn, Patteson, Reverend Henry Melvill, General Robert Wynyard, and Sir Duncan Cameron. The fundraising likely would not have met the target without their support given Mauku was a small rural settlement.

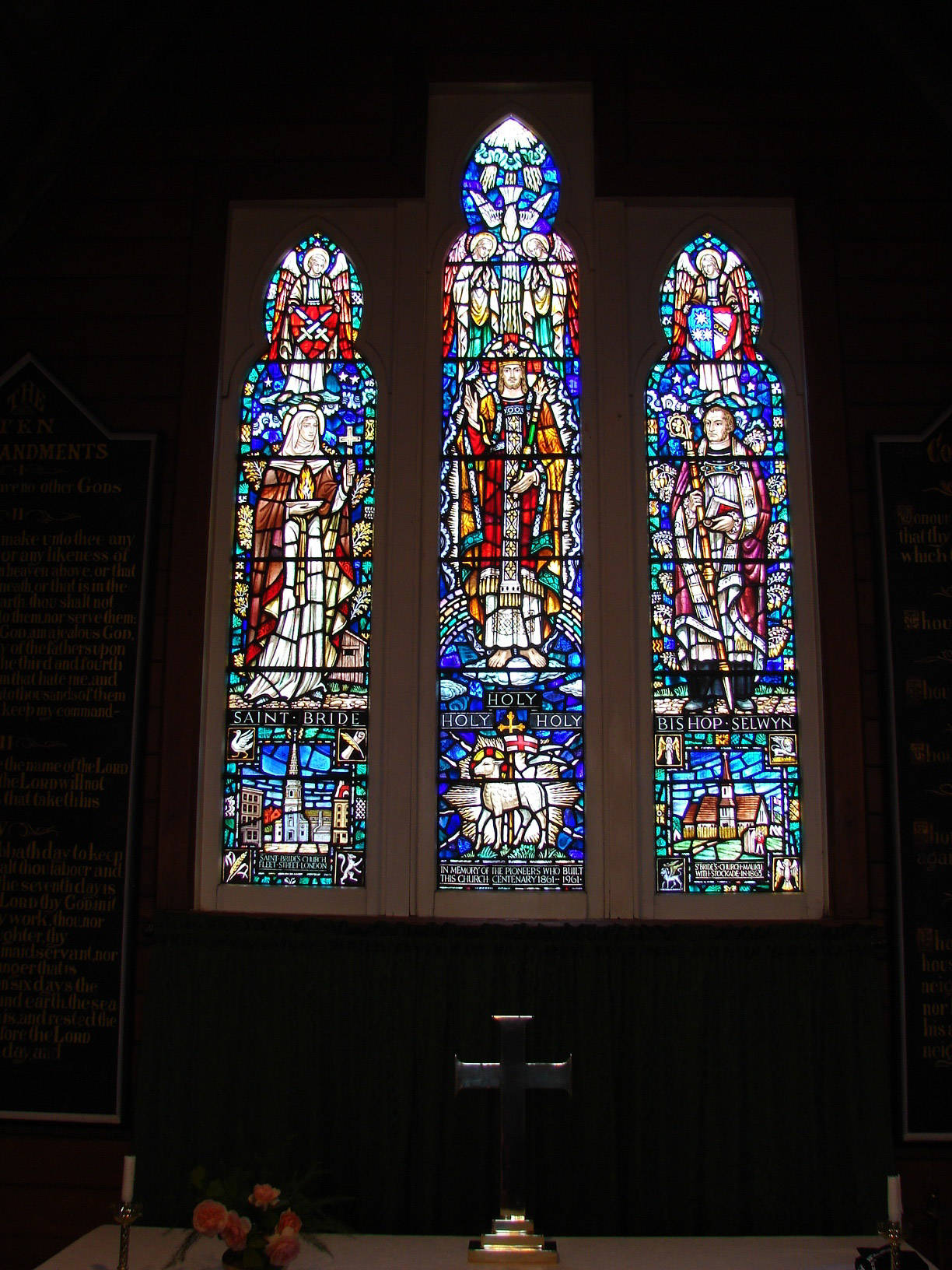
Stained-glass window of St Bride's Church, Mauku, depicting Saint Bride, St Bride's Church, Fleet Street, London; Jesus Christ, the Moravian Church seal; Bishop Selwyn, and St Bride's Church, Mauku

In December 1860, construction began and was completed on a Sunday, 14 July 1861. The cost was approximately £300. It was the first church to be constructed in the Franklin area. As was common with churches in small rural settlements in New Zealand, it also served Presbyterians and Methodists.

Following the Invasion of the Waikato in July 1863, many isolated European settlements became worried about potential raids from hostile Māori. The women and children of Mauku evacuated to Auckland. The Onehunga Ladies' Benevolent Society was set up to provide aid and care for some of the refugees from Mauku and a 10 ft (3.0 m) high stockade was constructed around St Bride's to serve as a military outpost. Between 600 and 2,000 men were based at the church at one point. Fifty-four loopholes were cut into the church during this period and these still remain. No battle took place at the church, although a deadly battle took place just 2 km (1.2 mi) south of the church at Titi Hill. On 23 October 1863, a scouting party from St Bride's Church investigated sounds of gunshots and found Māori killing cattle at a farm south of the church. A Lieutenant Percival disobeyed orders to remain at the church and set out with a dozen men towards Titi Hill. Percival's men were overwhelmed before 50 riflemen came from the church to assist them. Eventually the Europeans retreated after suffering at least 9 fatalities. The church was also the headquarters of the Forest Rangers after the aforementioned battle. After the end of the war the church underwent repairs from damage it had sustained from the military occupation.

In 1872 a vicarage was built and the Reverend Ezra Robert Otway was appointed vicar. In 1876 the Reverend William Taylor was appointed vicar. Taylor resigned in April 1882, and died a few months later. Taylor was laid to rest in the church cemetery. In 1882 the vicar relocated to Waiuku and the vicarage at Mauku was let to other groups. Following the opening of the Paerata-Waiuku line the government took part of the vicarage glebe. The building was sold and removed in 1947.

In 1884 a pulpit, font, and stained-glass windows were installed. The following year on 22 February, the church was consecrated by bishop William Cowie. The lack of earlier consecration may have been out of a desire to allow other denominations to use the church.

Following the enfranchisement of women in 1893, a motion was brought to the diocesan synod by the Mauku synod representative, Heywood Crispe, that would have seen women enfranchised in the Anglican church. Ultimately it was amended and never took effect.

The puriri block foundations was replaced with concrete in 1953. A neighbouring property was purchased in 1956 to serve as a Sunday school and church hall. In 1961 a stained-glass window, created by Whitefriars Stained Glass Studio, was installed for the centenary. The left window shows Saint Bride with St Bride's Church, Fleet Street, shown below. The middle window shows Jesus Christ, with the Moravian Church seal shown below. The right window shows Bishop Selwyn and below it St Bride's Church, Mauku, with the stockade around it. The windows cost £600.

== Connections to St Bride's, London ==
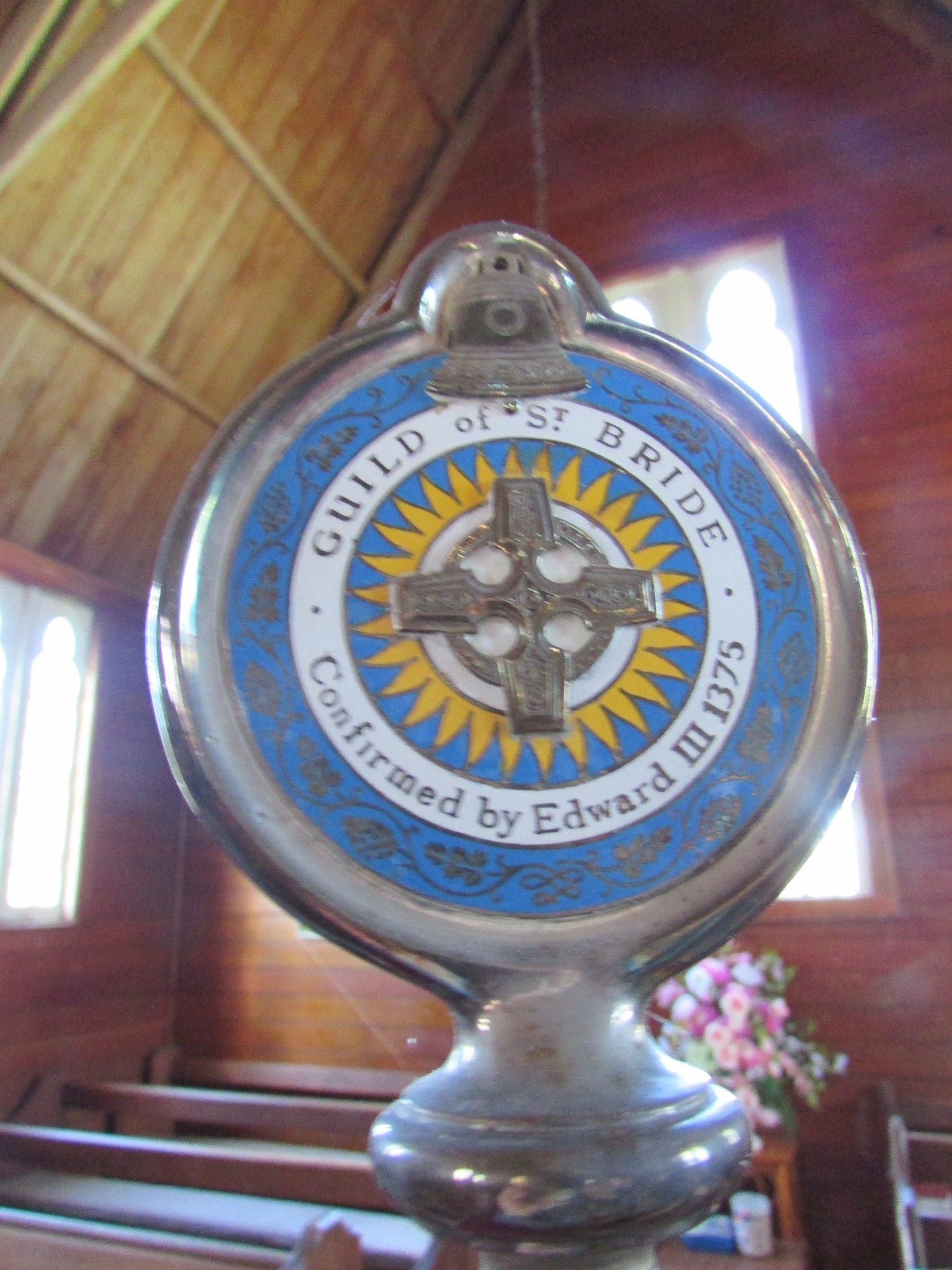
The Guild of St Bride medallion in the Mauku church

One of the founders of St Bride's Church had been a member of St Bride's Church in Fleet Street, London. The London church had also sent a donation helping to establish the church in Mauku. It was later decided to name the new church after St Bride's in Fleet Street. In 1941 the Mauku church sent £100 and food parcels to St Bride's, Fleet Street, following the London Blitz that severely damaged the Fleet Street church. In 1952 £57 was sent from Mauku for restoration of the Fleet Street church. During St Bride's centennial in 1961 the vicar, reverend, and two wardens were made liverymen of the Guild of St Bride, a guild sanctioned by Edward III in 1375. St Bride's Church, Mauku, now displays the medallions they were awarded. The Vicar of St Bride's, Fleet Street, referred to the Mauku church as the daughter of St Bride's Church. Parishioners of the Mauku church send flowers on St Bride's Day to the Fleet Street church.

== Legacy ==
The design of St Bride's Church has been described as simple and elegant by architect Peter Lewis Sheppard. The spire has been described as being well proportioned and giving 'character and distinction' to the building. As well as being a landmark due to being visible across the district.

St Bride's Church is listed as a category 1 historic place with Heritage New Zealand.
