= Elizabeth George (disambiguation) =

Elizabeth George is an American author of mystery novels set in Great Britain.

Elizabeth George may also refer to:

- Elizabeth George (author) (born 1944), American Christian writer, teacher, and public speaker
- Elizabeth George (businesswoman) (1814–1902), New Zealand hotel owner, businesswoman and community leader
- Elizabeth Anne George (1935–2012), Australian botanical writer

== See also ==
- Elizabeth George Speare (1908–1994), American children's author
