= Onehunga Library =

Library in Auckland, New Zealand

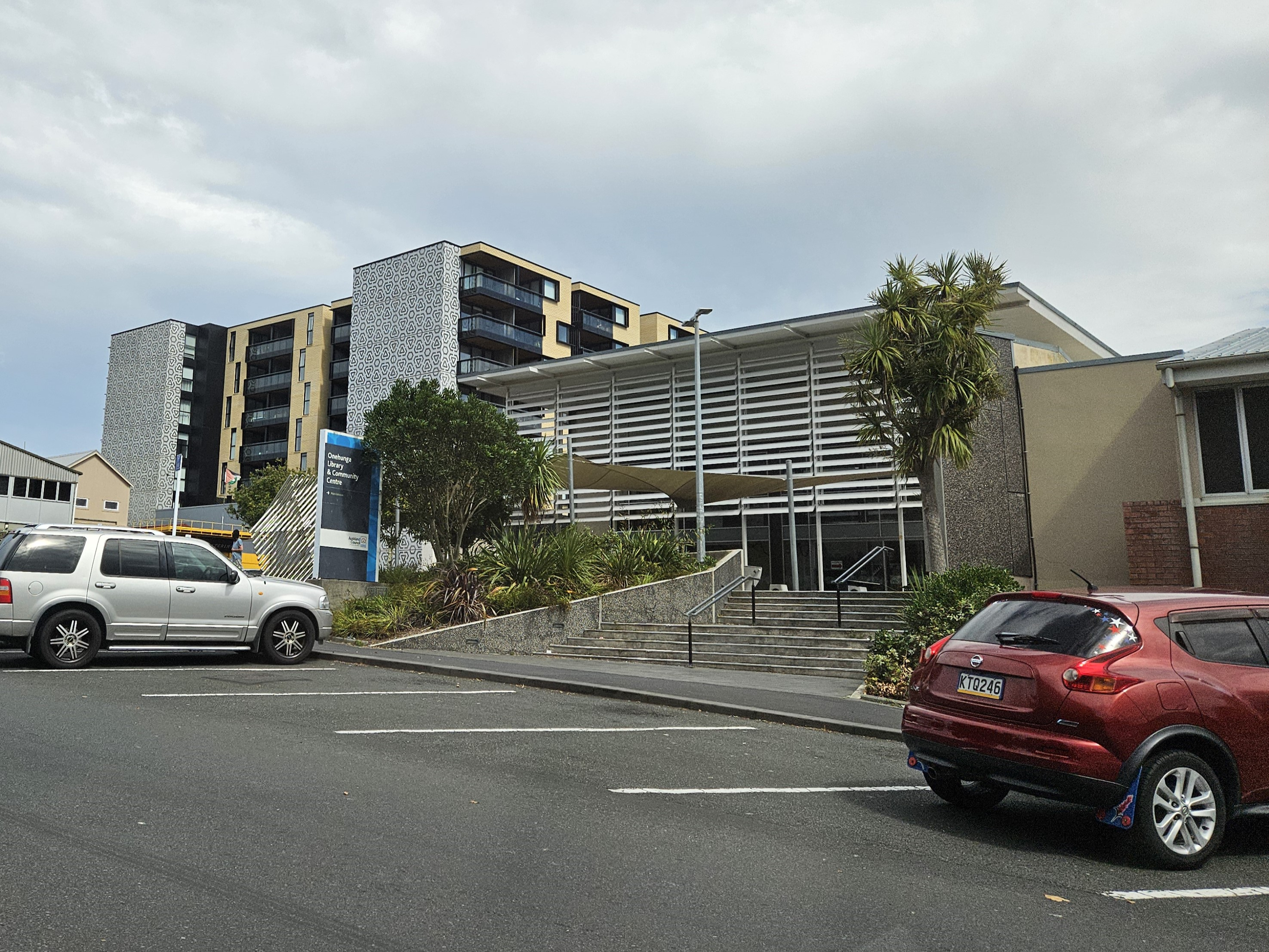
- Onehunga Library seen from Church Street
- 36°55′24″S 174°47′04″E
- Location: 85 Church Street, Onehunga, Auckland, New Zealand
- Type: Public library
- Established: March 1855; 171 years ago
- Branch of: Auckland Libraries

Collection
- Size: Floating

The Onehunga Library is a public library located in Onehunga, a suburb of Auckland, New Zealand. First established as a public library in March 1855 and housed in the Anglican school house near St Peter's Church, the library grew in scope and was moved to Queen Street (Onehunga Mall) in 1870. After closing in the 1890s and reopening in the Onehunga Institute building in 1901, the library committee and Onehunga Borough Council applied for the construction of a Carnegie library, which was opened in 1912 and operated until 1967. In 1970, the library began operating again from the Onehunga Borough Council building, and in 1989 became a part of the Auckland City Libraries system. The current building was constructed in 2003, and features two public sculptures at its entrance, Hautaha (2004) and Matau (1972).

== Location and building ==
The Onehunga Library & Community Centre is located on Church Street, Onehunga. Two sculptures are found at the entrance to the library on Church Street: Hautaha (2004) and Matau (1972). The Filipe Tohi-designed sculpture Hautaha is a "complex and three-dimensional" sculpture, built from steel tubes, and woven in the style of Tongan lalava binding. It was unveiled after the opening of the current Onehunga Library space in 2004. Matau (also known as A.H.I. - W.H. Bond Sculpture) is a cement sculpture by Jim Palmer. Commissioned by the W. H. Bond company and donated to Onehunga in 1972 to celebrate the 50th anniversary of the founding of the company, Palmer's entry was the winning sculpture chosen by the W. H. Bond company and Alex Harvey Industries. Palmer was inspired by the legend of Māui fishing up the North Island, with the sculpture representing the whale bone fish hook and anchor stone Māui uses in the legend. Originally located in a reflection pool on Onehunga Mall, the sculpture was moved to the entrance of the library in 2003.

The facility also houses a branch of the Citizens Advice Bureau, a cafe, shared offices and community meeting rooms.

== History ==
=== Early libraries in Onehunga ===
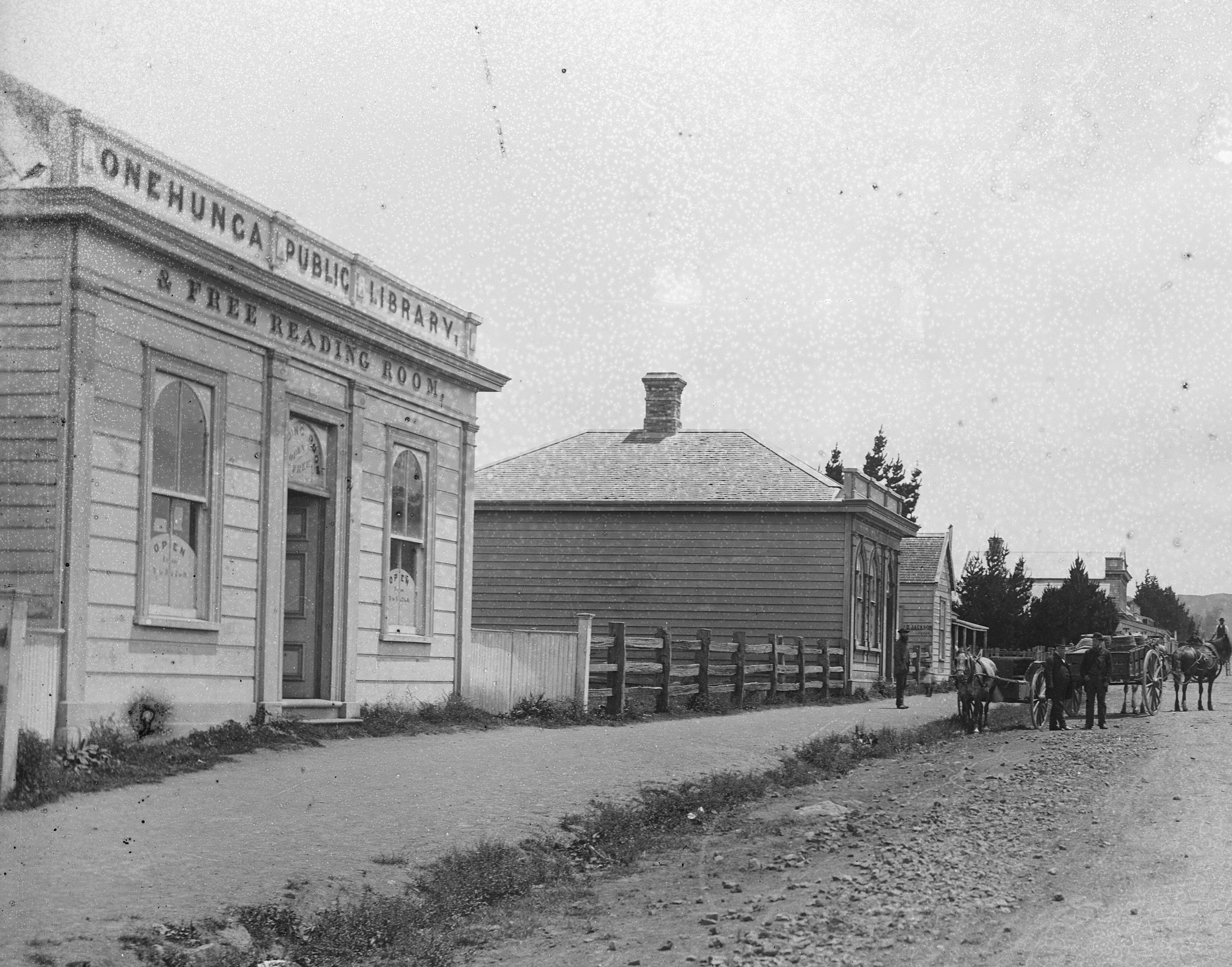
The Onehunga Public Library on Queen Street (Onehunga Mall) in 1884

The earliest library in Onehunga was the Royal New Zealand Fencible Corps library, a collection of 250 books purchased from Longmans publishing by Secretary at War Fox Maule-Ramsay, 11th Earl of Dalhousie through a £100 grant from the British Treasury. The books arrived in New Zealand on the Ann in May 1848 and were stored at Captain Kenney's home in Onehunga, becoming one of the first public libraries in New Zealand. The collection was not often used, likely due to high levels of illiteracy, or Fencible soldiers not wanting to visit the home of a commanding officer. Later, the collection was moved from Kenney's home on Nixon Street to a vacant house on Queen Street (Onehunga Mall), leading to greater usage.

In November 1854, a public meeting was held to discuss the establishment of a public library. By March 1855, the collection was moved to a free reading room in the Anglican school house near St Peter's Church, and had become a subscription service. Some books likely becoming a part of the Onehunga Institute library when it opened in June 1861. By 1862, the collection expanded to approximately 400 books.

A library was established on Newsome Street in 1865, moving to two separate buildings on Queen Street in 1870, one of which was an Edward Bartley-designed wooden building. By 1874, the library was known as the Onehunga Free Library, and had grown to include approximately 850 books. By the mid-1870s, the Onehunga Free Library committee asked the Onehunga Borough Council to construct a purpose-built library for the collection, which they agreed to. By 1879, the library had begun receiving funding from the borough council, however due to funding difficulties, the books were stored in a spare room in the council chambers, essentially closing by 1896.

On 21 December 1901, a new library was established in the old Onehunga Institute building, growing to have 80 members and a collection of 1,500 books by 1902.

=== Onehunga Carnegie Public Library ===
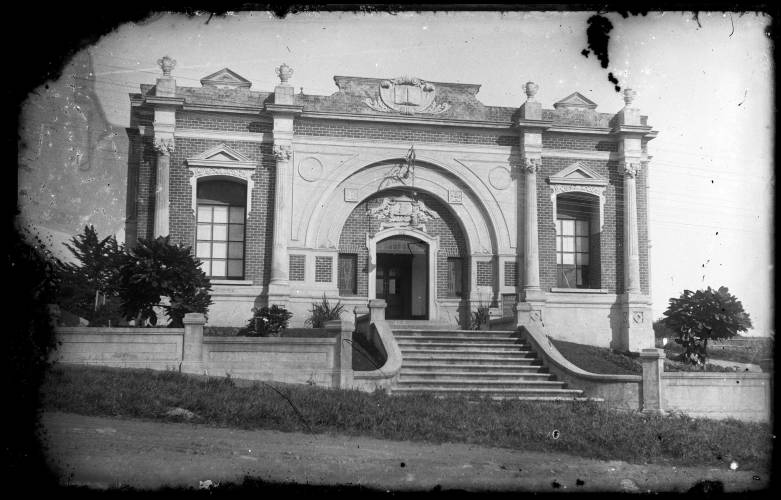
The Onehunga Carnegie Free Library in 1912

The Onehunga Library Committee approached the Carnegie Corporation for a grant in 1904. After years of discussions, the Onehunga Borough Council agreed to the Carnegie Corporation conditions, including providing a suitable site for construction, and the grant was successfully lodged in 1910. The brick Edwardian Classical building was designed by local architect John Park and constructed by W. Maud junior, opening on 12 September 1912 as the Onehunga Carnegie Free Library on Princes Street, on Princes Street, at the council's former Fencible military parade reserve.

By the 1940s, membership had expanded to over 2,000 members, and children's library services had begun operating. By 1948, the library established a branch in the neighbouring suburb of Oranga, which closed on 14 December 1959 due to lack of patronage.

In August 1957, the library was renamed as the Onehunga Carnegie Public Library, also known as the Onehunga Public Library. The building was vacated in 1967, with the library reopening on 21 February 1970, when the new Onehunga borough council building was opened and the library collections were moved to the new site. The collections had expanded to include 36,000 books by 1977, with there being over 9,000 members of the library.

The Carnegie building became vacant and was at-threat of demolition, something opposed by the local Onehunga community. The Onehunga Borough Council refurbished the property between 1987 and 1989, with the building becoming a Heritage New Zealand Historic Place Category 1 building in 1987. It reopened on 12 August 1988 as a community space, and was sold into private ownership in 1998, operating as a restaurant and cafe.

=== Amalgamation with Auckland City Libraries ===
During the 1989 local government reforms when the Onehunga Borough was merged with Auckland City, the Onehunga Public Library became a branch of the Auckland City Libraries on 1 November 1989. The library was closed on 31 March 2001. The building was demolished, and a new library and community centre was opened on 22 February 2003, designed by Andrews Scott Cotton (ASC Architects), who won the NZIA Resene Colour Award 2004 for designing the structure.

== Gallery ==
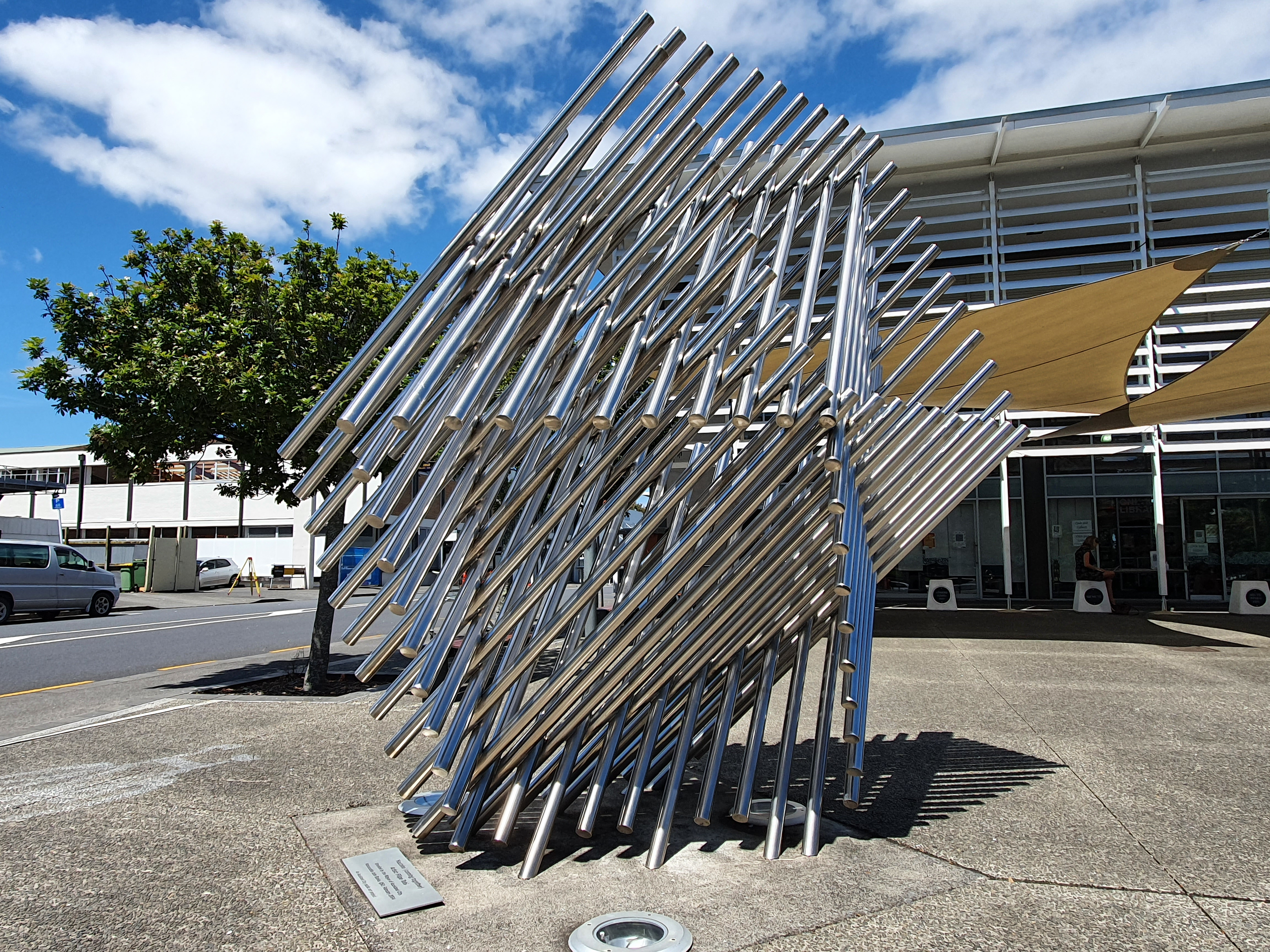
Hautaha (2004)

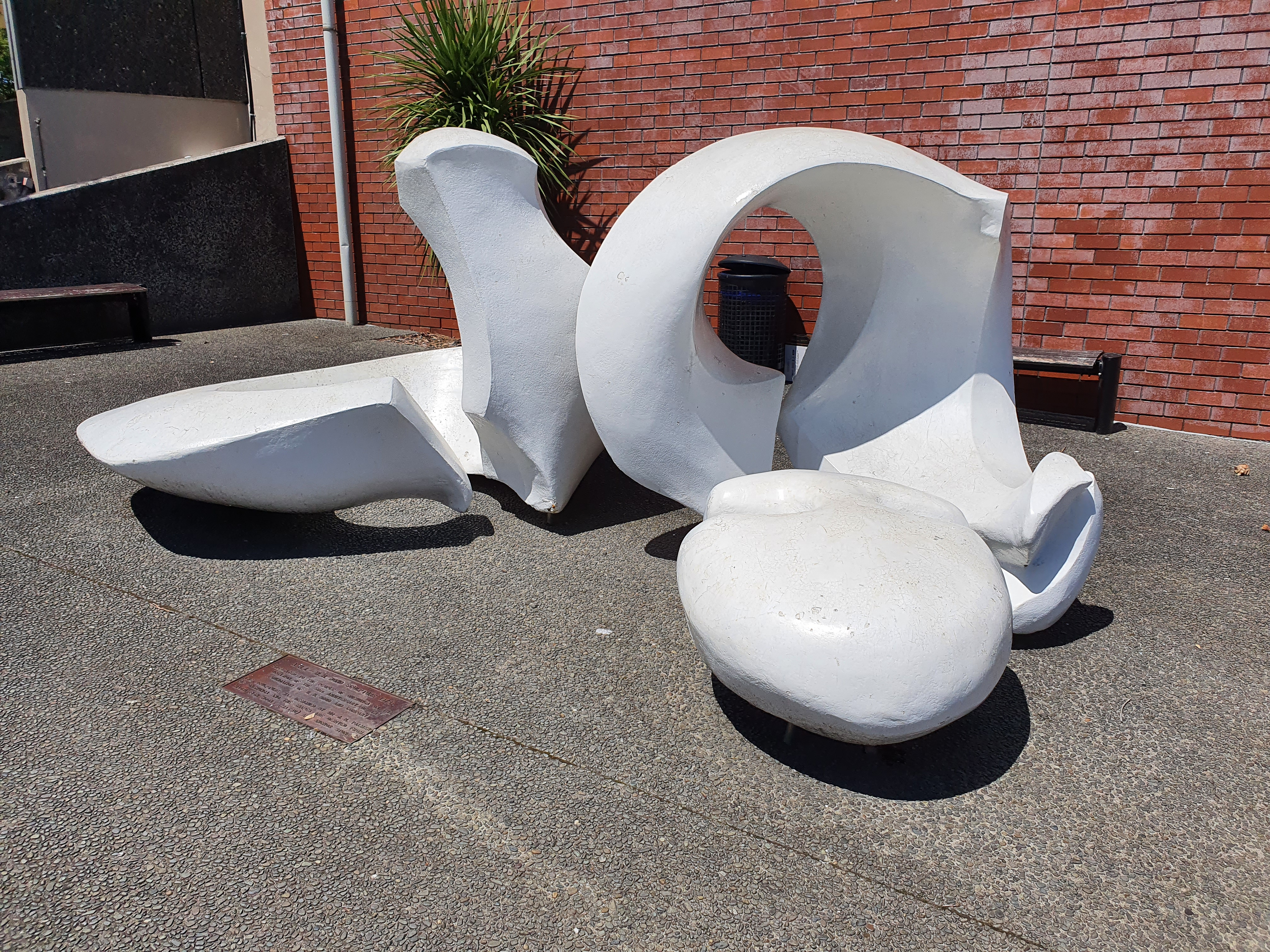
Matau (1972)

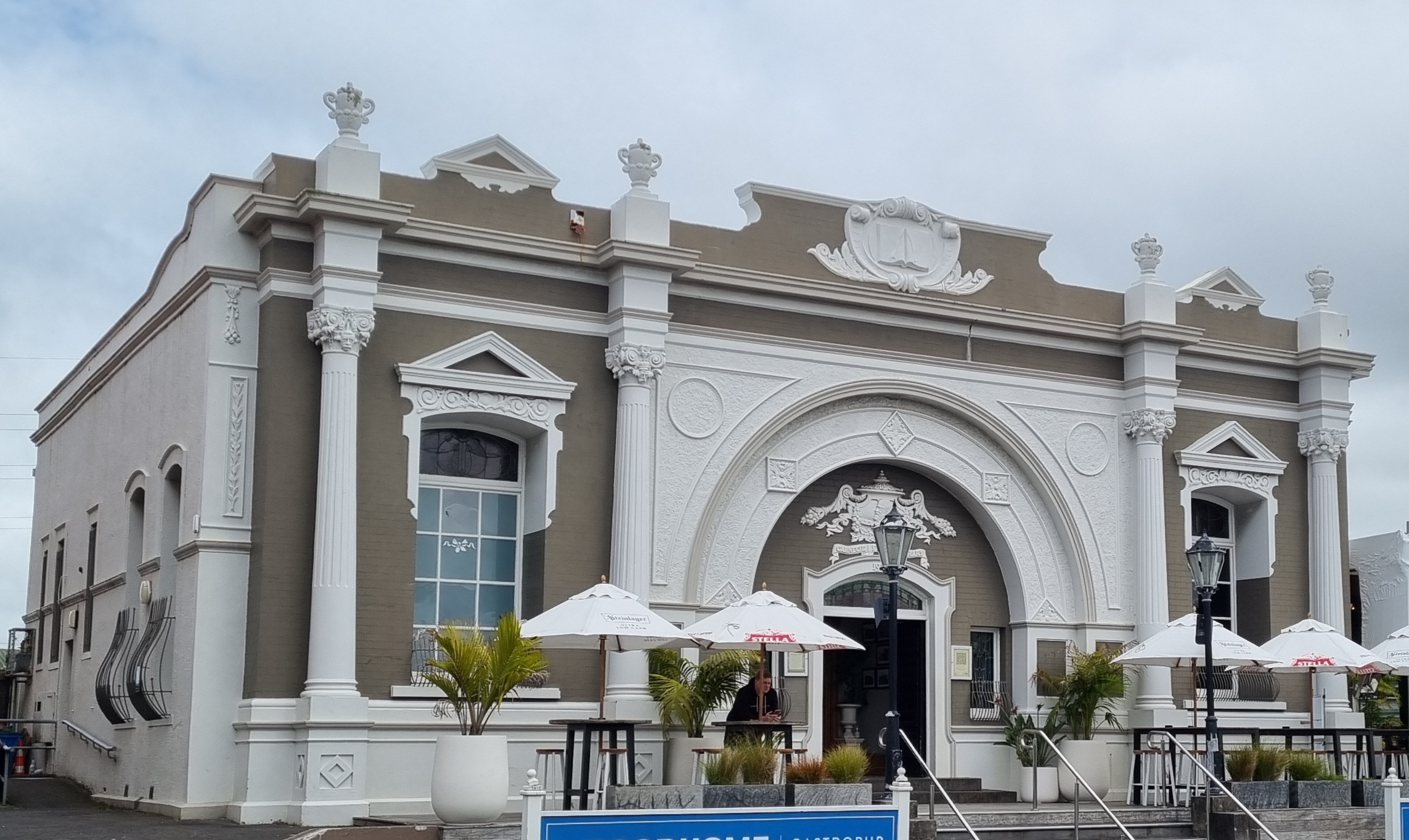
The former Carnegie Free Library building, photographed in 2023.

== Bibliography ==
- Verran, David (April 2011). Auckland City Libraries: Another Chapter. Auckland: Auckland Libraries. ISBN 978-0-473-18578-7.
