= Furley =

Furley is an English surname.

== Notable people with the surname ==
- Eileen Furley (1900–1985), first woman to represent the Liberal Party in the New South Wales Legislative
- Matilda Furley (1813–1899), New Zealand storekeeper, baker, butcher, hotel-keeper and community leader
- John Furley (1836–1919), English humanitarian
- Oliver Furley (1927–2015), English historian and political scientist
- Ralph Furley, fictional character on the sitcom Three's Company

== As a given name ==
- Philip Furley Fyson (1877–1947), British botanists and educator

== See also ==
- Furley, Kansas is an unincorporated community in Sedgwick County, Kansas, United States
- Furley, Bioextracts is a privately incorporated company in Semenyih, Selangor, Malaysia
