= Chapel of St John the Evangelist, Auckland =

Historic chapel in Auckland, New Zealand

Chapel of St John the Evangelist
- Collegiate Chapel of St John the Evangelist
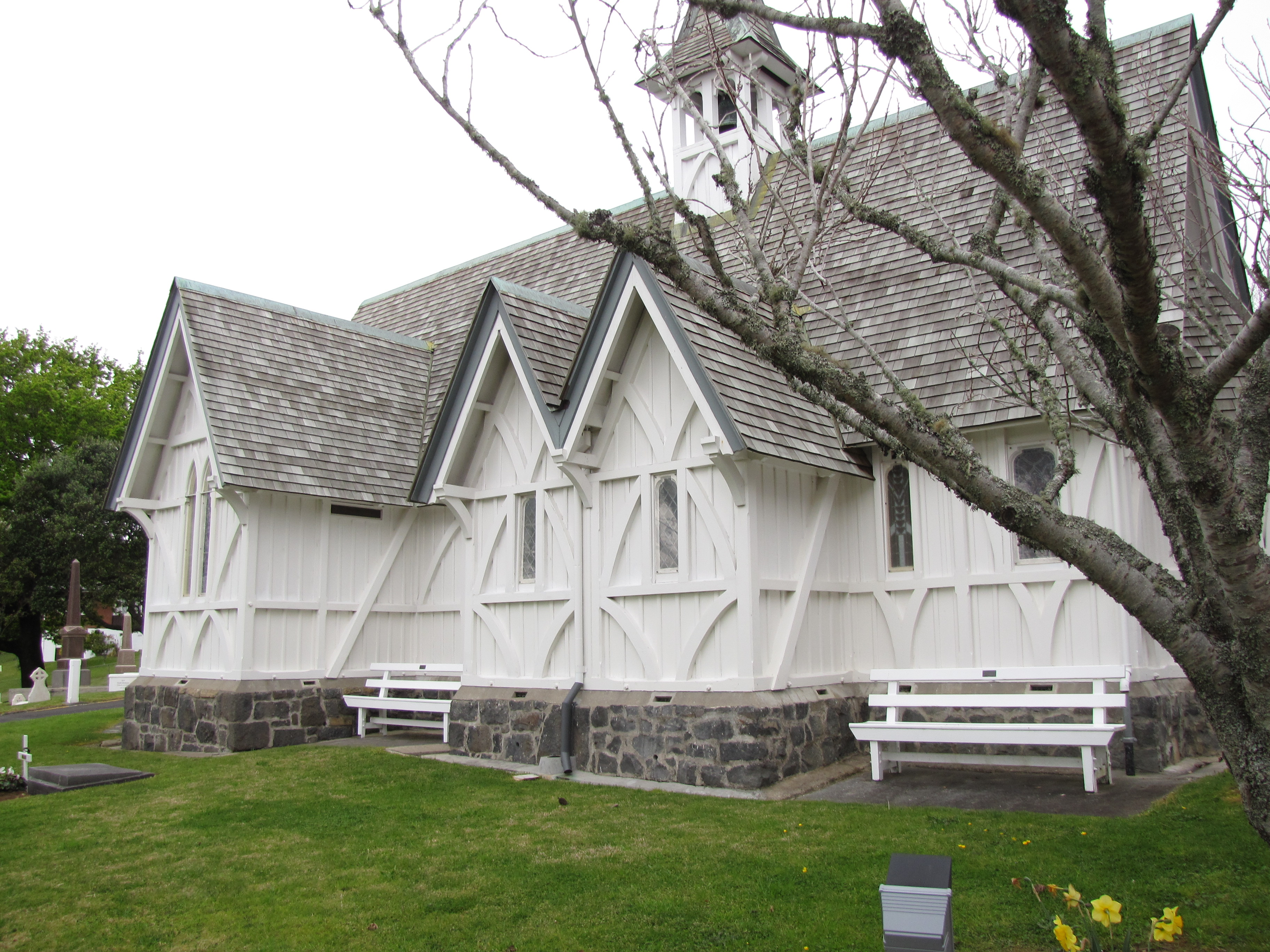
- The chapel in 2012
- Chapel of St John the Evangelist
- 36°52′25.61″S 174°50′29.18″E
- Address: 188–226 St Johns Road, Meadowbank, Auckland
- Country: New Zealand
- Denomination: Anglican

History
- Status: Chapel
- Dedication: John the Evangelist
- Consecrated: 1847 by Bishop Selwyn

Architecture
- Functional status: Active
- Architect: Frederick Thatcher
- Architectural type: Church
- Completed: 1847
- Construction cost: £330

Specifications
- Materials: Kauri and tōtara timber

Administration
- Province: Anglican Church in Aotearoa, New Zealand and Polynesia
- Diocese: Auckland

Heritage New Zealand – Category 1
- Designated: 23 June 1983
- Reference no.: 13

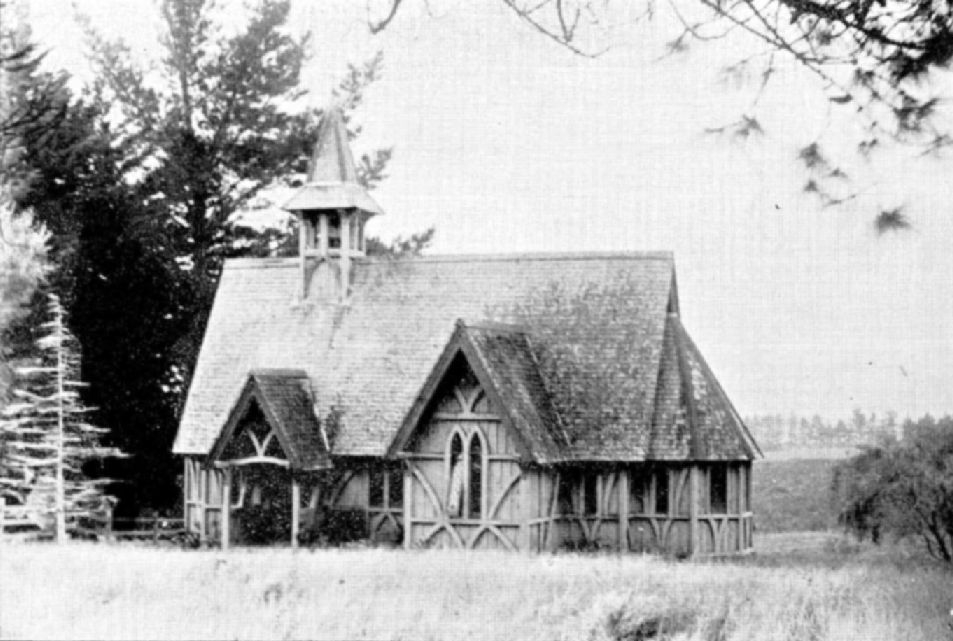
The chapel c. 1900

The Chapel of St John the Evangelist, formally, the Collegiate Chapel of St John the Evangelist, is an heritage-listed Anglican chapel that forms part of St John's College in the suburb of Meadowbank, Auckland, New Zealand. It is the oldest surviving church building in Auckland.

== History ==
Building began of the Chapel of St John the Evangelist in March 1847. The chapel was consecrated by Bishop Selwyn in November 1847. The chapel was designed by Frederick Thatcher and built at a cost of £330.

It was registered on 23 June 1983 by the New Zealand Historic Places Trust as a Category I historic place. It is still in use as a chapel on the site of St John's Theological College.

== Description ==
The Chapel was built of kauri and tōtara timber with a stone base. It is cruciform in plan with "apsidal east and west ends," and has externally exposed timber framing with Thatcher later stopped deploying in his church designs. It is the earliest surviving example of a Selwyn Church, which are notable for their "steeply pitched roofs, overhanging eaves, early English fenestration and carefully calculated proportions."

== Modifications ==
The belfry, designed by Archdeacon Philip Walsh, was added in the early 1870s under John Kinder while he was warden of the college. In 1959, the Chapel was enlarged by extending it to the west by 10ft and matched the original kauri and tōtara timber. This extension was undertaken by architects Patterson, Lewis & Sutcliffe, and on the north side, an additional vestry was added. There are also several memorial windows to those associated with the college.

The altar dates from 1934 and the altar candlesticks are made from wood from St Botolph's Church, Boston, Lincolnshire. The bell is made from metal from bells originally in York Minster.
