= Onehunga Ladies' Benevolent Society =

Benevolent society in New Zealand

The Onehunga Ladies' Benevolent Society was established in 1863 to care for refugees of the Waikato War. The Onehunga benevolent society was the oldest surviving women's organisation by the time of its disestablishment in 2017.

== History ==
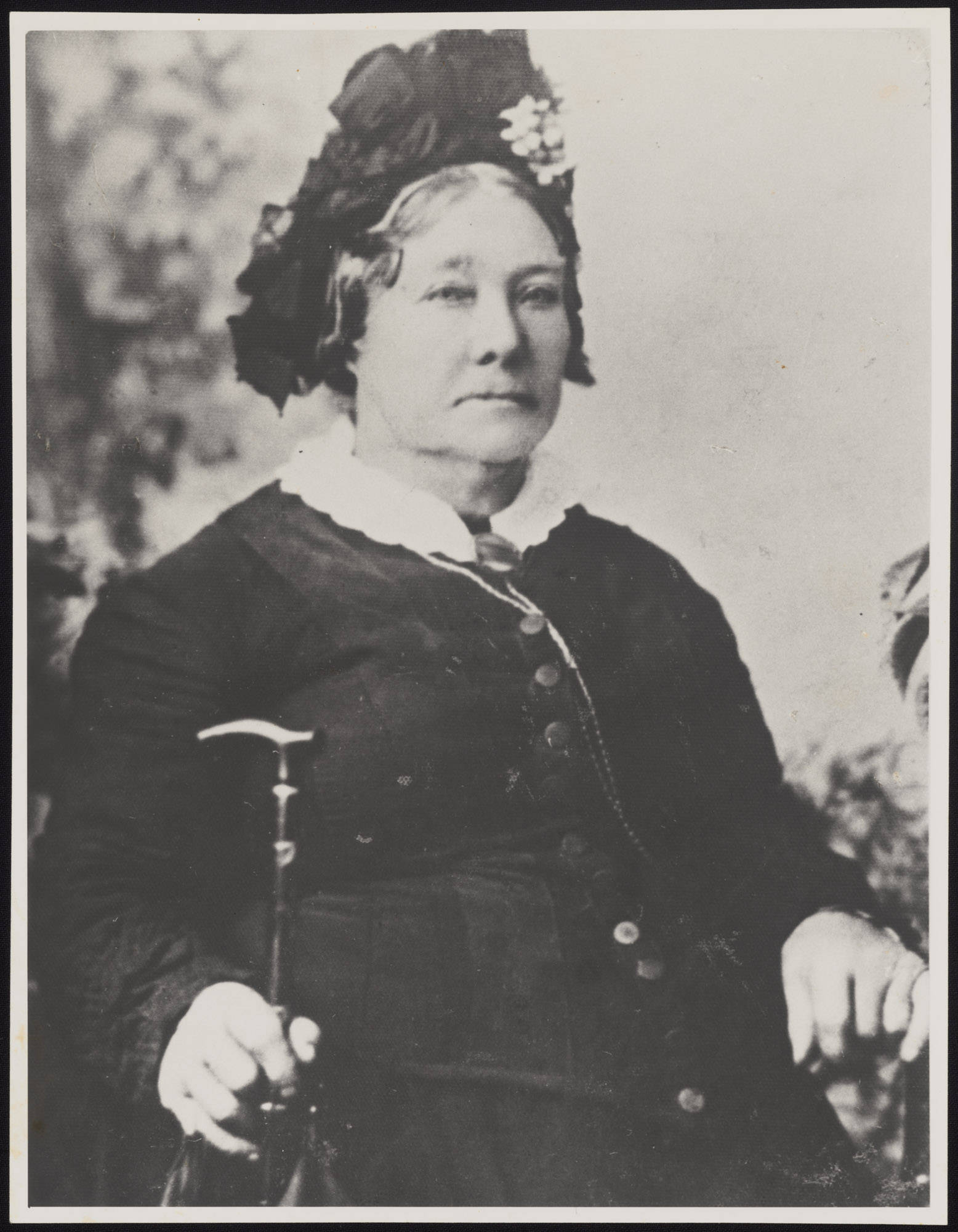
Matilda Furley, one of the founding members

Following a period of heightened tensions between the New Zealand government and Kingite Māori, many women and children evacuated European settlements south of Auckland. Many of these refugees wound up in Onehunga, where they were housed in substandard conditions in barracks. A meeting was held to discuss relief efforts and from that the Onehunga Ladies' Benevolent Society was formed in August 1863.

After the return of the refugees to their homes after the end of the Invasion of the Waikato in 1864 the society continued to exist. It focused mostly on the needs of destitute women and children. The society fundraised through concerts, soirées, and appeals to the public. Originally meetings were held in the Anglican schoolhouse and later at St Peter's Anglican Church.

During the 19th century the society provided blankets, clothes, food, and money for small loans and rents to those in need, as well as providing widows with black dresses. The 20th century was similar with milk, fuel, groceries, and clothes being the most common items provided.

The society struggled to meet demand during the Great Depression until the introduction of social security saw a steep reduction in their services. The society continued to shrink until after the economic reforms of the 1980s, where the society began to increase the amount of people they provided to. In 1992 most of those receiving support from the society were referred by other social welfare agencies, including the Department of Social Development.

In 2007 the organisation was officially registered as a charity and was mostly providing food parcels. In 2013 it was still making use of a grant bequested in 1917. In 2017 it was deregistered for failing to file returns. By 2017 it was the oldest extant women's organisation in New Zealand.

== Notable members ==
- Matilda Furley: founding member
- Elizabeth George: founding member
- Hazel Askew: Queen's Service Medal recipient and member of the society for more than 40 years.
