= Waipipi =

- A procession at St Mark's Anglican Church in 1914
- Coordinates: 37.21°S 174.684°E
- Country: New Zealand
- Region: Auckland Region
- Ward: Franklin ward
- Board: Franklin Local Board

Government
  - Territorial Authority: Auckland Council
- Postcode: 2684
- Area code: 09

Waipipi is a rural locality in the North Island of New Zealand.

== Geography ==
Waipipi is located west of the Waiuku River.

== Etymology ==
Waipipi is a Māori word made up of Wai (stream) and pipi (cockle). The name is in reference to the bank of an estuary with a large amount of cockles.

== History ==
Waipipi was first settled by Europeans in the 1860s.

== Government ==
Waipipi was originally governed by the Waipipi Road District, formed 26 September 1867, which amalgamated with Franklin County in 1913. Waipipi was one of eight ridings of Franklin County.
