= Matilda Furley =

New Zealand storekeeper, baker, butcher, hotel-keeper and community leader

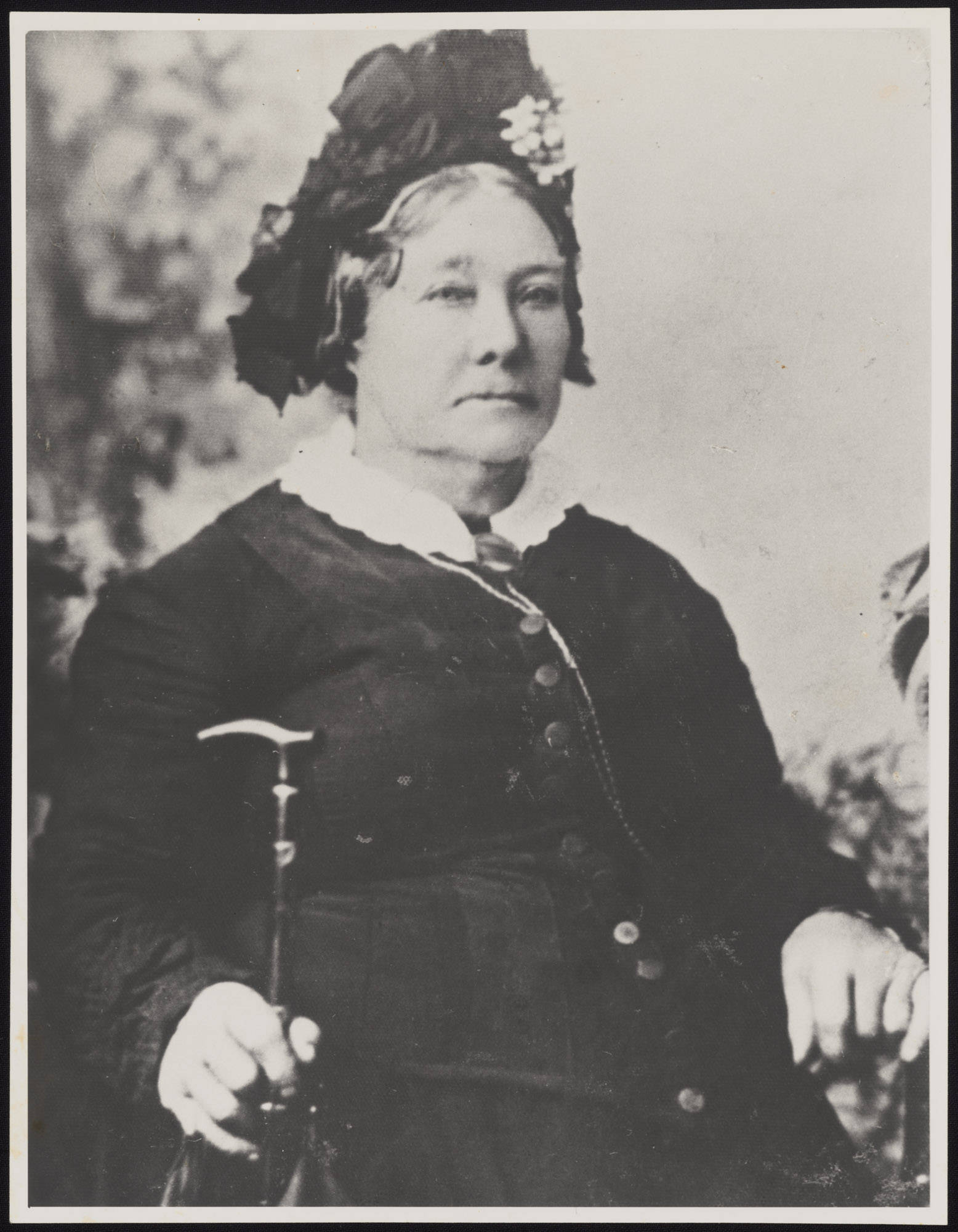
- Portrait of Matilda Furley
- Born: Matilda Webb; May 30, 1813; North Nibley, Gloucestershire, England
- Died: October 22, 1899 (aged 86); Onehunga Borough, New Zealand
- Burial place: St Peter's Anglican Church, Onehunga
- Organization: Onehunga Ladies' Benevolent Society
- Known for: Philanthropy

Matilda Furley (née Webb) (30 May 1813 – 22 October 1899), was a New Zealand storekeeper, baker, butcher, hotel-keeper and community leader. She was one of the founders of the Onehunga Ladies' Benevolent Society.

== Early life ==
Matilda Webb was born in North Nibley, Gloucestershire, England, On 30 May 1813. Her family had a long history in the wool trade and by age 12 Matilda was working at a wool mill in Dursley her father owned. Matilda married Samuel Furley, a weaver, 9 May 1835 at Oldham, Lancastershire. They had three daughters.

== Life in New Zealand ==
In either 1840 or 1841 the Furleys arrived in Auckland. They first lived on Princes Street, Auckland, and later at Mechanics Bay. During this time the Furleys had a general store on Queen Street. In 1844 the Furleys sold the store and moved to Onehunga. Matilda bartered with Māori for pigs and other produce. From this she became a butcher for the small town. Matilda was active in the Onehunga community and was a member of St Peter's Church, the local Anglican church.

In 1847 Onehunga experienced growth following the fencible settlement of Onehunga. This led to the Furleys expanding their business on Princes Street, Onehunga. In 1854 they sold the business and Matilda opened a bakery and confectionery on Queen Street, Onehunga. Matilda continued to run the bakery until the 1890s. In 1877 Matilda relied on her experience in the wool mills back in England to resolve an issue with the machines for the Onehunga Woollen Mills.

In May 1863, many women and children arrived in Onehunga as refugees following fears of attacks by Māori on European settlements. These refugees lived in substandard conditions in barracks. Their conditions spurred the founding of the Onehunga Ladies' Benevolent Society, of which Matilda was a founding member.

Matilda died on 22 October 1899. She was buried at the cemetery of St Peter's next to her husband.

== Legacy ==
Furley Place, a service lane in Onehunga, is named after Matilda.
