= Mauku =

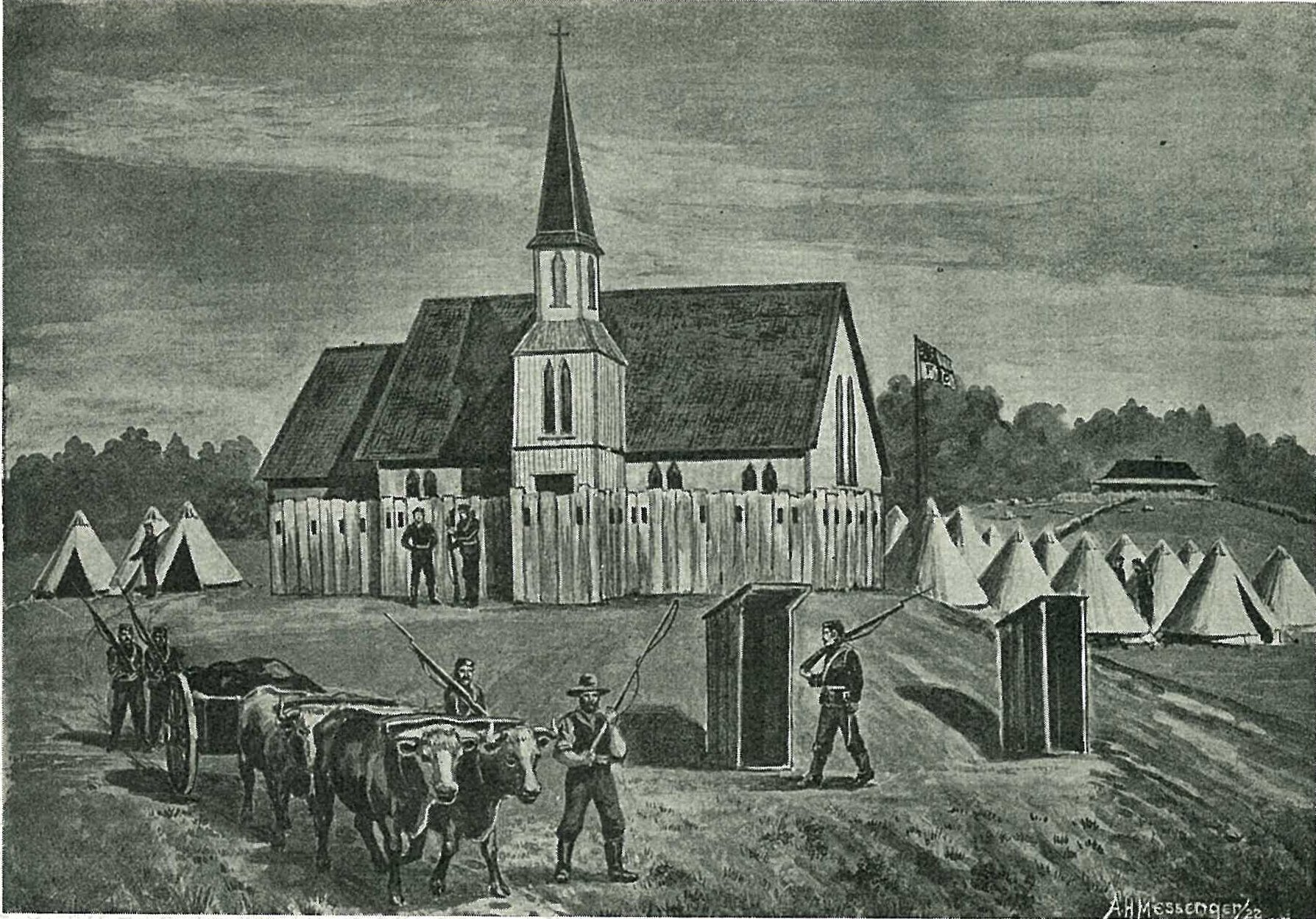
- An illustration of St Bride's Church in 1863 showing the stockade and tents surrounding the church
- Interactive map of Mauku
- Coordinates: 37.202°S 174.816°E
- Country: New Zealand
- Region: Auckland Region
- Ward: Franklin ward
- Board: Franklin Local Board
- Electorates: Port Waikato; Hauraki-Waikato

Government
  - Territorial Authority: Auckland Council

Mauku is a settlement located 10 km (6.2 mi) west of Pukekohe in New Zealand.

== History ==
Mauku was the first settlement in the Franklin area west of Pukekohe. It was settled c.1854, at the mouth of a stream that led into the Manukau Harbour as this provided access to Onehunga. With the development of roads and the forests cleared the settlement moved inland. It was originally the most important settlement in the area; Pukekohe and Patumahoe did not have European settlement and Waiuku had only a few settlers.

Mauku was the first settlement in the Franklin area to have a church. St Bride's Church was opened on the 14th, July, 1861.

In July 1863 the Invasion of the Waikato began and settlers in Mauku became worried about an attack from hostile Māori. The women and children of Mauku evacuated to Auckland and a stockade was constructed around St Bride's to serve as a military outpost. Up to 2,000 men were based at the church at one point. Mauku was also the base of the Forest Rangers during the war.

The Mauku Historical Cemetery is located 4 kilometres (2.5 miles) north of the settlement.

== Government ==
The Mauku Road District Board administered the area from 2 August 1872 before amalgamating with Franklin County in 1913.
