= Awhitu =

Settlement on the Āwhitu Peninsula, New Zealand

Coordinates: 37°04′58″S 174°38′09″E

Awhitu is a rural settlement on the Āwhitu Peninsula in New Zealand.

== History ==
The Awhitu Road District Board governed Awhitu from 13 February 1868 until 1915 when it dissolved to come under the direct governance of Franklin County in 1915. Awhitu became one of eight ridings of Franklin County.

== Education ==
Awhitu District School is a coeducational full primary schools (years 1–8) with a roll of 107 students as of March 2025.
