= The World's First Lady Mayor =

- Based on: Docu-drama
- Cinematography: Enos Silvanus Pegler
- Release date: 1900
- Running time: 1 min 9 sec
- Country: New Zealand
- Language: Silent

External videos
- The World's First Lady Mayor (The NZ Archive of Film)

The World's First Lady Mayor was a 1900 New Zealand silent docu-drama film. It is the second-oldest surviving film in New Zealand, the oldest being The Departure of the Second Contingent for the Boer War from earlier the same year.

In the 69-second film, Elizabeth Yates is re-enacting a speech she gave as mayor in 1893. Yates was the first woman mayor in the British Empire when elected mayor of Onehunga, New Zealand in 1893.

Susanna M. Salter of Argonia, Kansas, is widely regarded as the first woman elected mayor in the world.
