= Selwyn churches =

Historic Anglican churches in the Auckland region, New Zealand

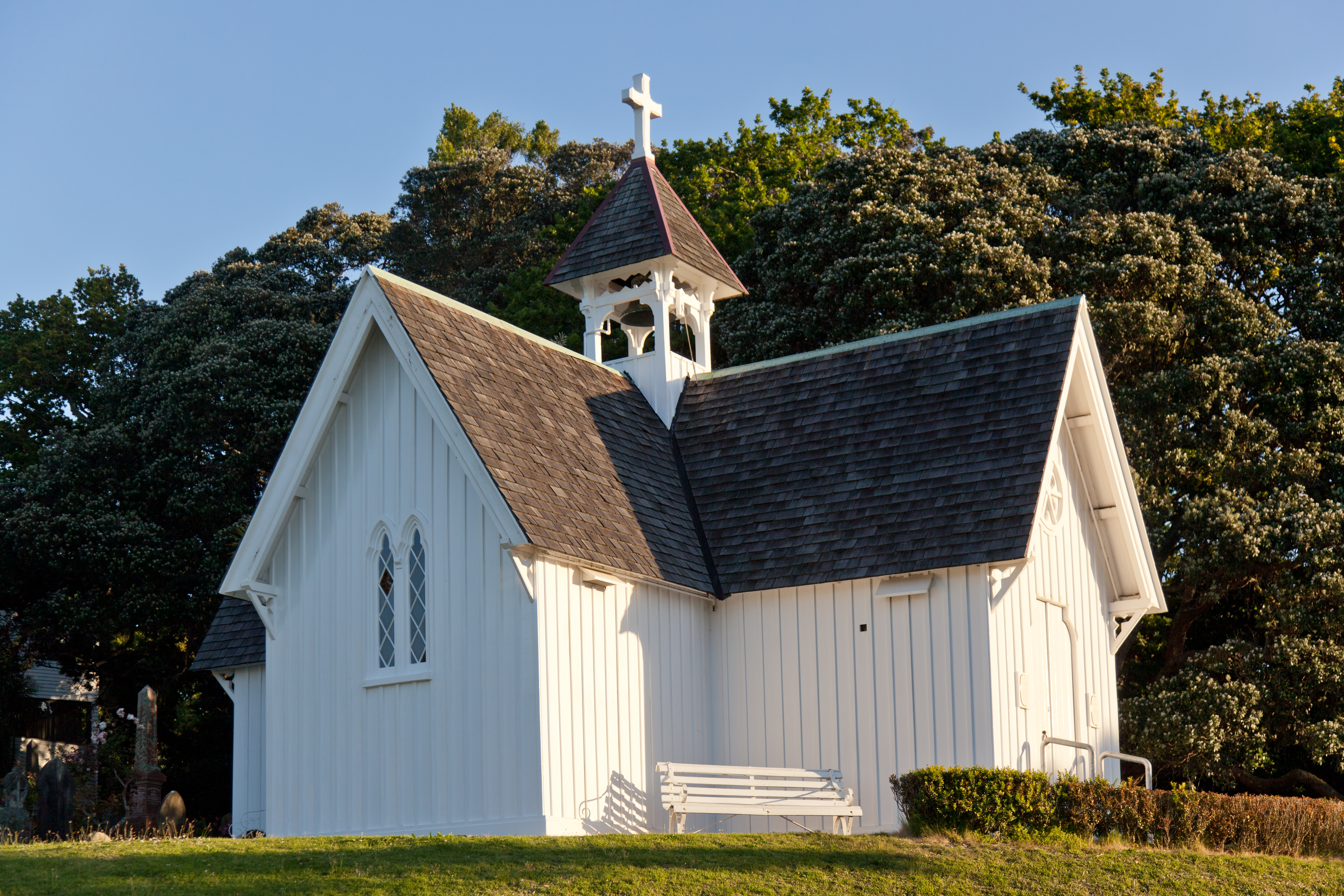
St Stephen's Chapel in Judges Bay

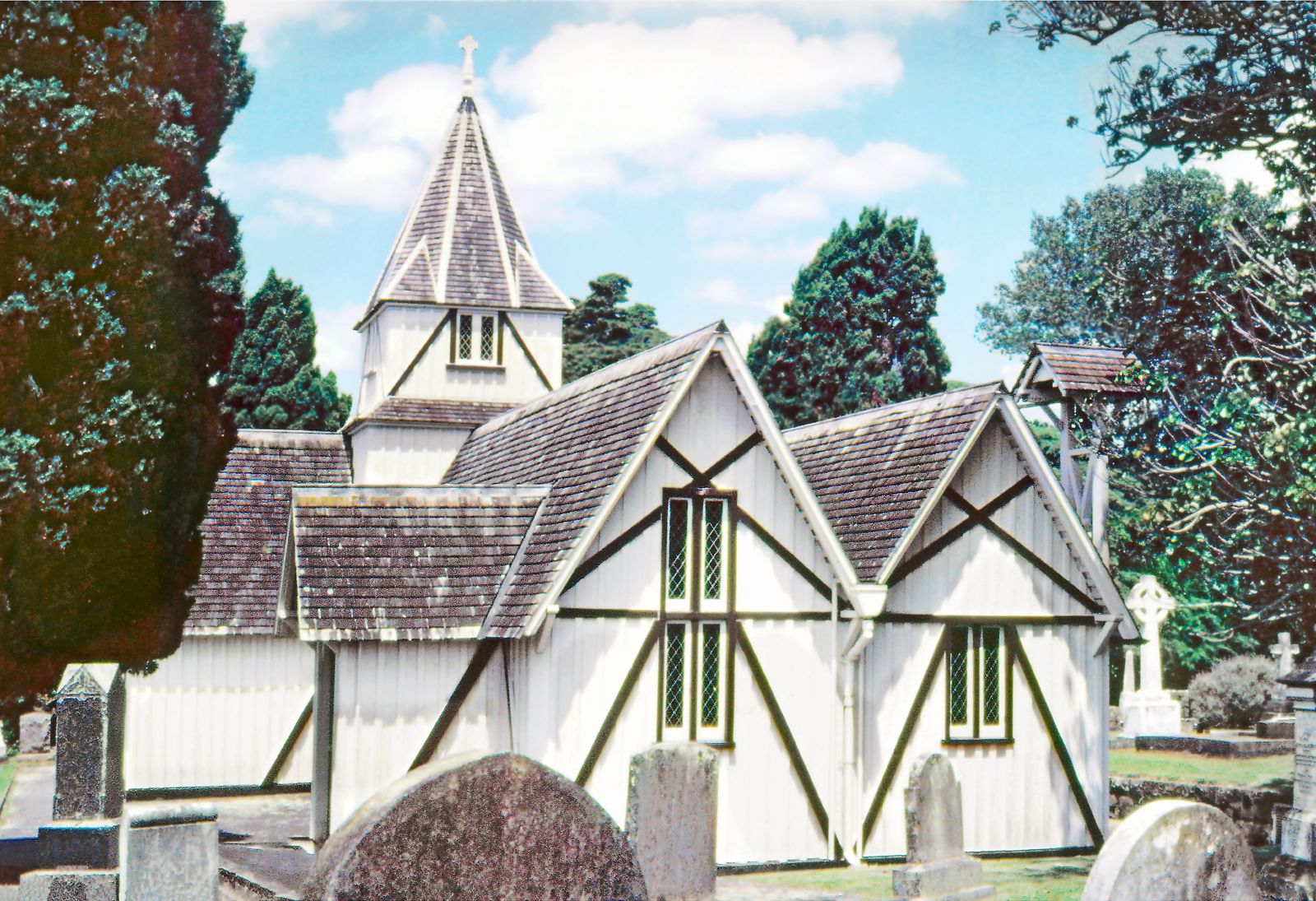
All Saints Church, Howick

The Selwyn churches were a group of 19th-century Anglican churches and chapels in the Auckland region, New Zealand, named after Bishop Selwyn, who inspired their construction. The majority were built in wood in the neo-gothic style, and many were designed by the architect Frederick Thatcher.

Two Selwyn churches, St Bride's Church in Mauku and the Holy Trinity in Otahuhu were designed by Arthur Guyon Purchas, an associate of the Bishop Selwyn.

Most Selwyn churches were constructed from local timber, mainly kauri and totara. Earlier churches were simple with a rectangular nave, and a smaller chancel; larger churches containing a spire and smaller ones having a belfry; internal walls were stained and varnished; Tudor style oriel windows were used in some. Examples of these include: All Saints Church, Howick, St Peter's Anglican Church, Onehunga, and St Matthias' Church, Panmure.

In 1930 two architecture students recorded and surveyed some of the more well-known Selwyn churches.

Selwyn churches in the Auckland region:

- St Stephen's, Judges Bay (1844) – first St Stephen's chapel
- St Andrew's, Epsom (1846–67)
- St Thomas's, Tamaki (1847)
- St John's Chapel, Meadowbank
- All Saints, Howick (1847)
- St Mark's, Remuera (1847–60)
- St Peter's, Onehunga (1848)
- St Barnabas, Mt Eden (1848)
- St Barnabas, Parnell (1848)
- St James' Church, Okahu (c.1850)
- St Matthias', Panmure (1852)
- Old St Mary's, Parnell (1855–58) – replaced by St Mary's Cathedral
- St Stephen's Chapel, Judges Bay (1857)
- St James', Māngere Bridge (1857) – the only stone church
- St John the Baptist, Northcote (1860)
- St Bride's, Mauku (1860–61)
- All Souls', Clevedon (1861)
- Christ Church, Papakura (1862)
- St John's, Drury (1862)
- Holy Trinity, Otahuhu (1863) – moved in 1928 to become Selwyn Church, Mangere East
- St Sepulchre's, Eden Valley (1865–91)
- St Peter's in the Forest, Bombay (1867)
