= Elizabeth Yates (mayor) =

New Zealand politician

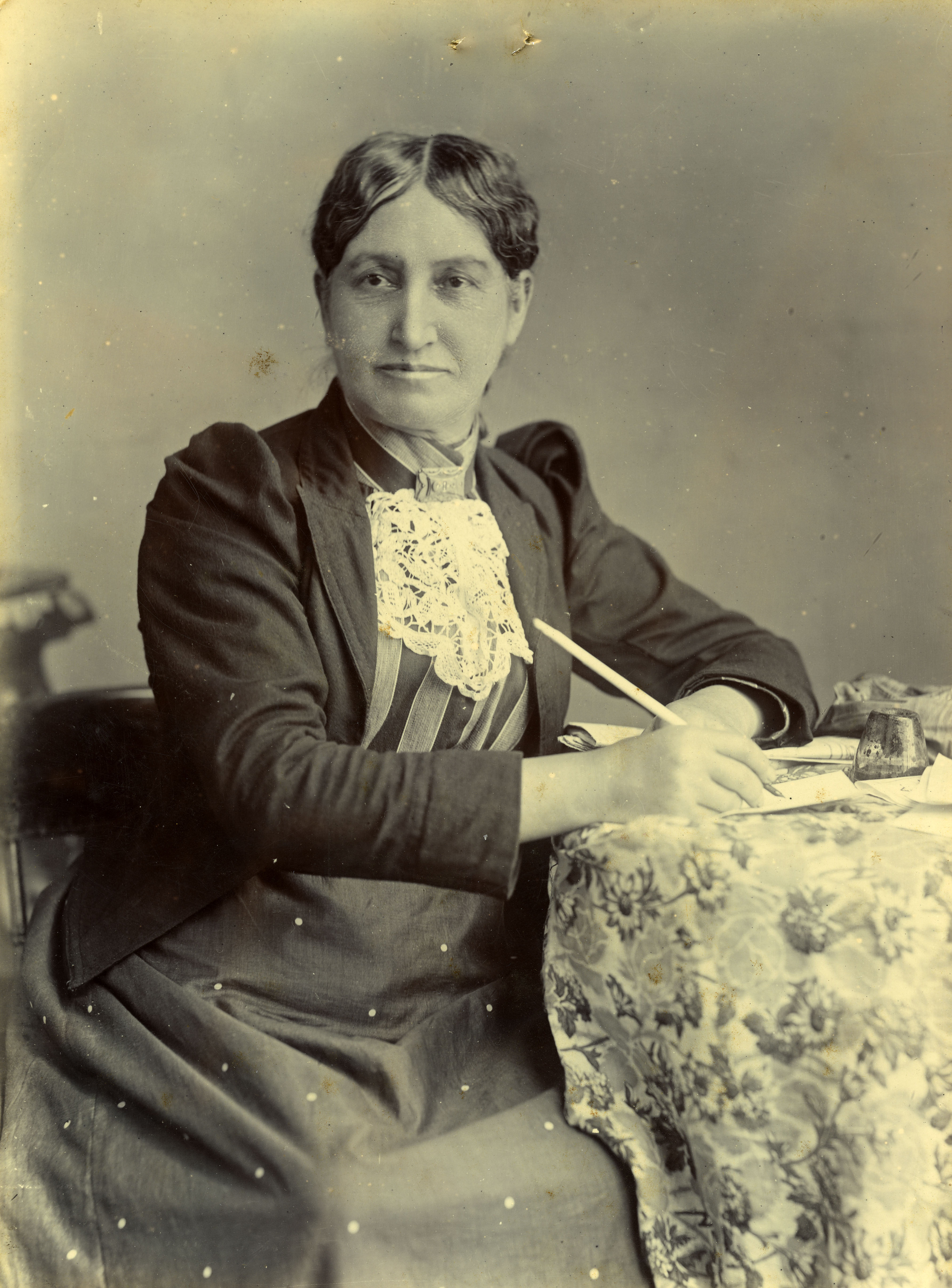
- Elizabeth Yates in 1894
- Born: 1840; Caithness, Scotland
- Died: 6 September 1918 (aged 78)
- Known for: First female mayor and Justice of the Peace in the British Empire
- Spouse: Captain Michael Yates

Elizabeth Yates (née Oman, 1840 – 6 September 1918) was a New Zealand politician who served as the mayor of Onehunga borough for most of 1894. She was the first female mayor in the British Empire.

== Biography ==
Yates was born Elizabeth Oman in Caithness, Scotland in 1840. She arrived to New Zealand with her family around December 1853 aboard the Berwick Castle. Although little is known about her early life, it is believed that her and her family lived in the Onehunga area from 1855 onwards.

In 1875, she married Michael Yates, master mariner, at St Peter's Church. The couple lived on Selwyn Street and had no children. Michael Yates was also on the Onehunga Borough Council, where he was a councilor from 1885 and then mayor from 1888 to 1892.

== Career ==
Yates was involved in politics through her strong support of the women's suffrage movement, as well as participation in the debates of the Auckland Union Parliament.

In 1893, after her husband had stood down from his post in 1892 due to ill health, she had accepted the nomination for the office of mayor. In November she defeated her opponent, Frederick Court, at the polls (also automatically becoming a Justice of the Peace) in a close race decided by only 13 votes. Yates became mayor of Onehunga on 16 January 1894. The election made international news and brought her congratulations from Premier Richard Seddon and Queen Victoria. Kate Sheppard noted that Yate's win was a fitting end to the year of 1893, which saw the signing of an Electoral Act that gave New Zealand women the vote.

This appointment made Yates the first woman mayor of the British Empire. Outside the British Empire, she was preceded by Susanna M. Salter who was elected mayor of Argonia, Kansas in 1887.

Yates was met with strong opposition from local councillors, town clerks and members of the public (four councillors and the town clerk resigned in response to her election, citing they would not work under a 'petticoat government'), and they often disrupted meetings and orchestrated opposition to her every proposal. It is noted by some critics that she did not help her own cause by being 'tactless' and 'dictatorial' in her manner. In November 1894, mayoralty was again contested. Yates ran again but was defeated at the polls by a significant margin, overall she only served one year as mayor.

Yates later returned as a councillor to the Borough Council for two years between 1899 and 1901. Even her opponents conceded that she had been very effective during her short tenure, having liquidated the borough debt, established a sinking fund, reorganised the fire brigade, upgraded roads, footpaths and sanitation, and having personally lobbied the government to authorise the reopening of the Waikaraka Cemetery.

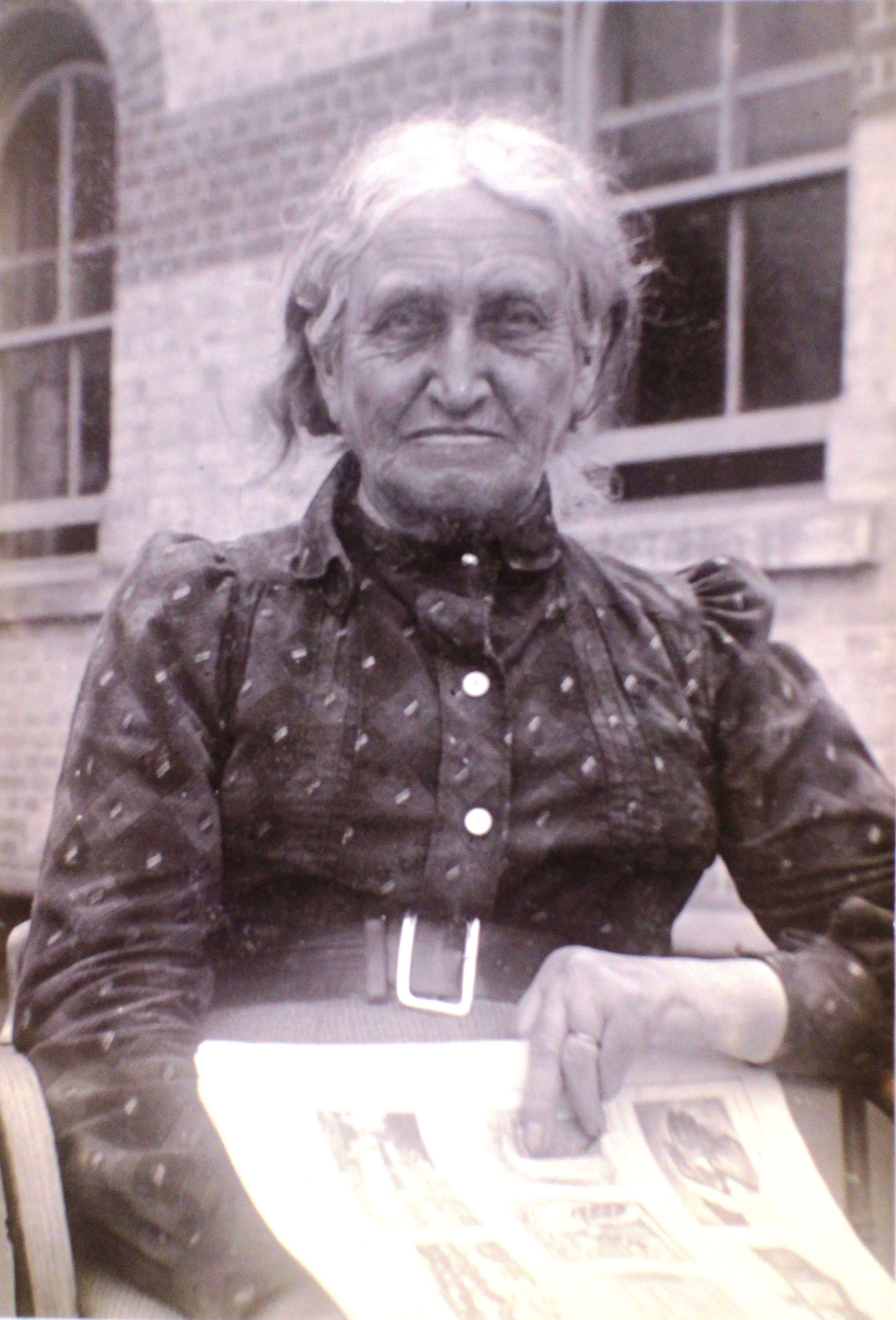
Yates later in life

== Later life ==
Following the death of her husband in 1902 and the decline of her political career, Yates suffered with dementia and alcoholism. She was committed to Auckland Mental Hospital in Avondale in 1909 until her death on 6 September 1918.

Yates was buried with her husband in the cemetery at St Peter's Churchyard in Onehunga.

== Legacy ==
Elizabeth and Michael Yates are the subjects in, The World's First Lady Mayor, the second oldest surviving New Zealand film shot by photographer Enos Pegler in 1900. The film was restored by Ngā Taonga Sound and Vision and is part of their moving image collection.

In 2019 a public mural of Yates was commissioned and installed by the Onehunga Business Association. Located on the corner of Onehunga Mall Road and Pearce Street, the mural was made by two local artists, Bobby MacDonald and Karlee Hirovaana-Nicholls.
