= Enos Pegler =

New Zealand photographer

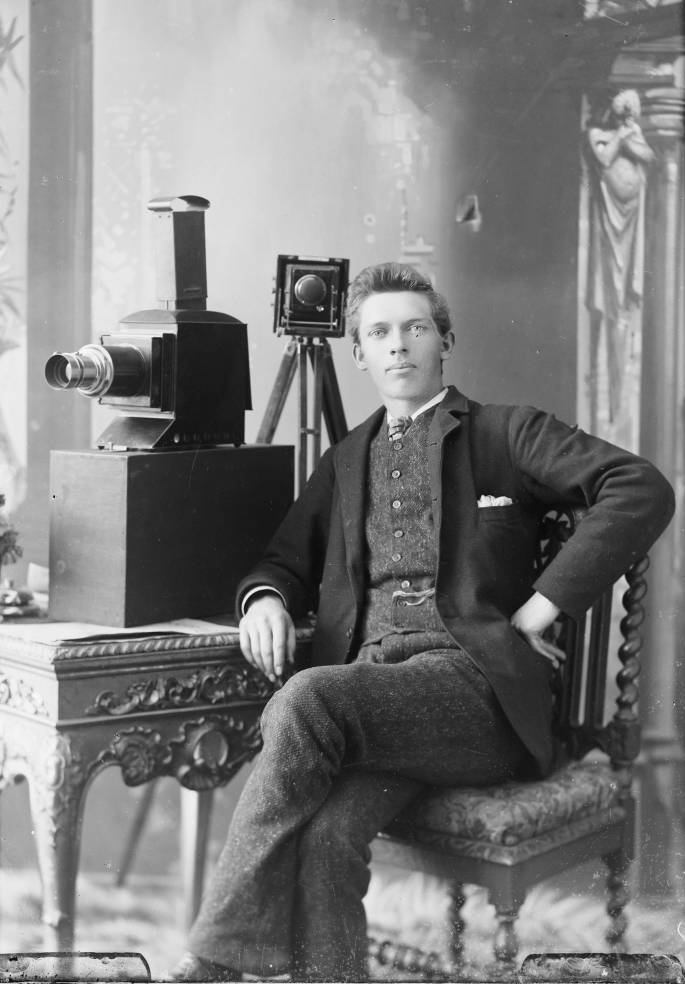
- Pegler in the 1890s, with a lantern slide projector and camera
- Born: 1869; King's Stanley, Gloucestershire, England
- Died: 13 October 1938 (aged 69); Epsom, Auckland, New Zealand
- Occupation: Photographer
- Spouse: Eliza Emily Oldham (m. 1892)

Enos Silvanus Abijah Pegler (1869 – 13 October 1938) was an early New Zealand photographer who documented New Zealand during the late 19th and early 20th centuries.

== Biography ==
Pegler was born in King's Stanley, Gloucestershire, England, in 1869 to mother Eliza Pegler (née Sealey) and father James William Pegler, a shoemaker. In 1875, he and his family (including sisters Julia Flatt and Emily Joeelin) emigrated to New Zealand, arriving on the Baron Aberdare on 19 March. The family resided in the Auckland suburb of Onehunga, where Pegler ran a photographic studio from 1894 to 1901.

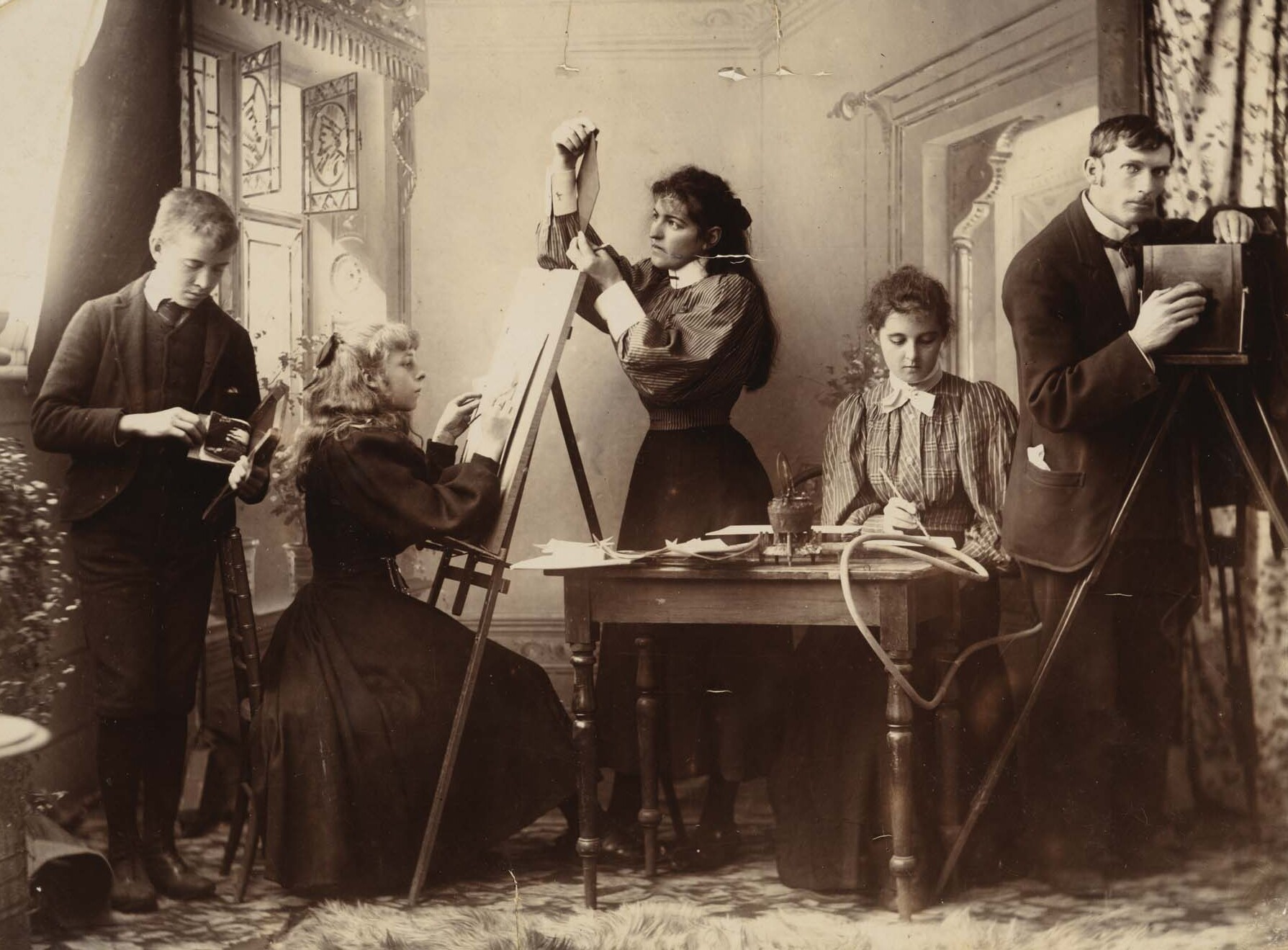
Studio group photograph, with Pegler on the far right

Pegler's photography was published in the Auckland Weekly News and he photographed notable New Zealand colonial figures, including Elizabeth Yates, the first female mayor in the British Empire. His film Lady Mayor depicts Yates and is the second-oldest New Zealand film in the collection of Ngā Taonga Sound & Vision. He also documented the tangihanga (funeral rites) of the second Māori monarch, Tāwhiao at Parawera in 1894.

Pegler married Eliza Emily Oldham on 15 March 1892 at the Wesleyan Church in Tuakau. The couple had four daughters and three sons.

In 1901, Pegler moved to Palmerston North, where he was manager of the Theatre Royal, and established a photographic studio, also importing and selling photographic supplies and giving free photography lessons. In Palmerston North, Pegler served as secretary of the Manawatu Cricket Association, and was instrumental in securing a match there between Manawatu and Lord Hawke's team that toured New Zealand in 1902–1903.

Pegler returned to Auckland in 1907, settling in Papatoetoe. He was a prominent figure is expanding the Auckland suburban railway service from Penrose to Papatoetoe. He widened his business concerns, with a real estate office and farm at Manurewa, and opened a studio at 91 Karangahape Road in Auckland. When the Manurewa Town Board was established in 1916, Pegler was elected as a member on a "progressive" ticket, although he had opposed the board's creation. In 1918, he unsuccessfully stood for election to the Manukau County Council.

Pegler was active in the sport of lawn bowls. In 1921, the Manurewa Town Board granted Pegler nine months' leave, and he travelled to Britain as a member of the New Zealand bowls team.

After a period of failing health, Pegler retired and he died at his home in the Auckland suburb of Epsom on 13 October 1938, at the age of 69. His wife died in 1953. They were both buried at Purewa Cemetery in Meadowbank.

== Photographic legacy ==
Pegler's photographic work is part of collections at Auckland Art Gallery, Te Papa, Auckland War Memorial Museum, National Library of New Zealand and Auckland Libraries. His work was displayed as part of the 2024 exhibition, A Different Light: First Photographs of Aotearoa.

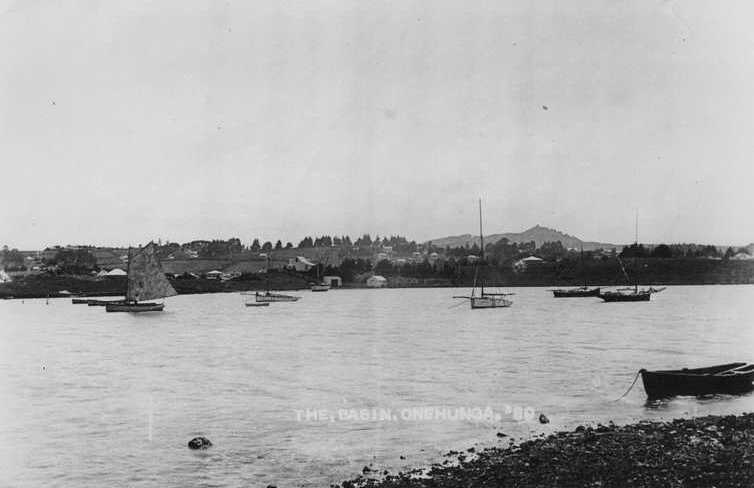

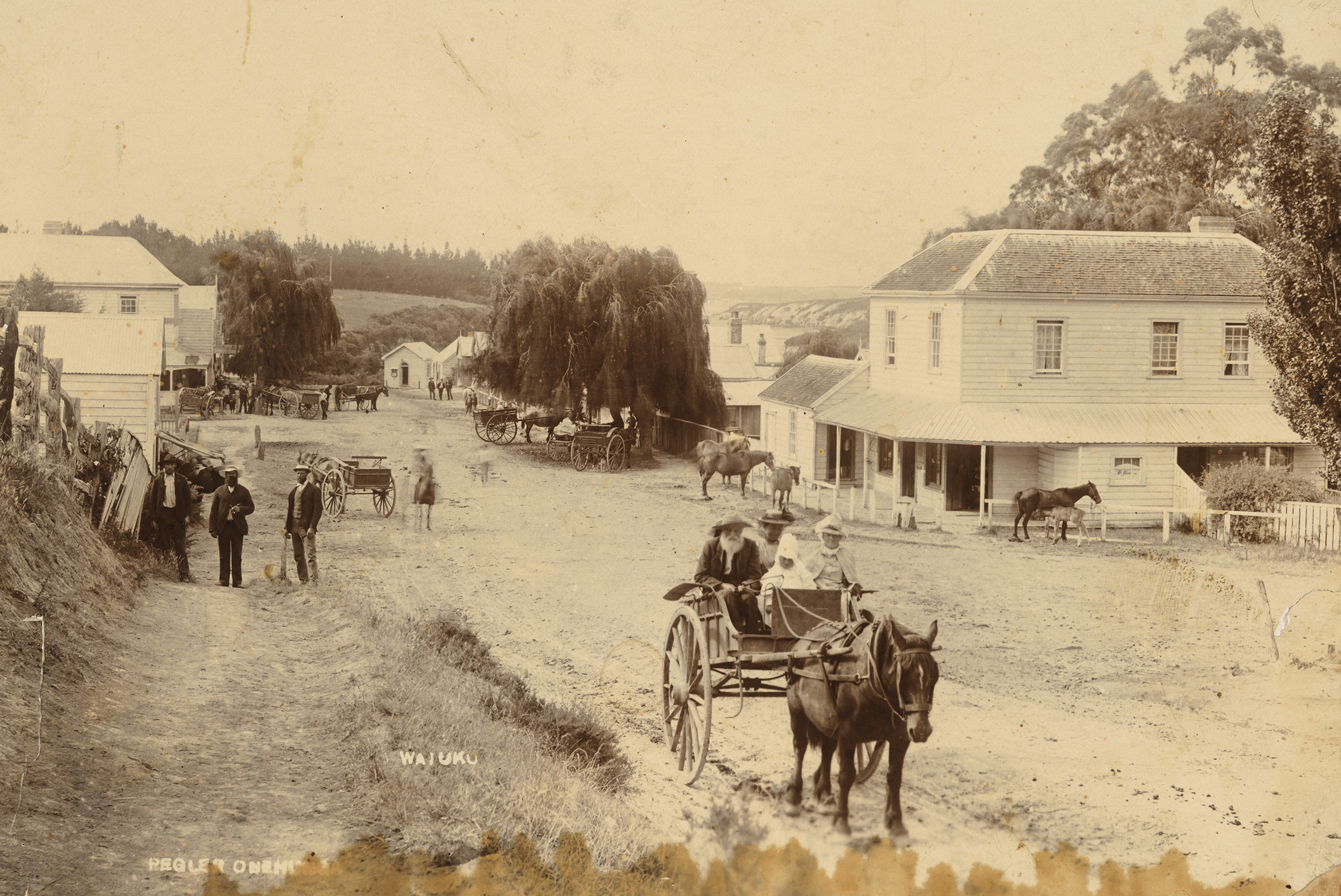

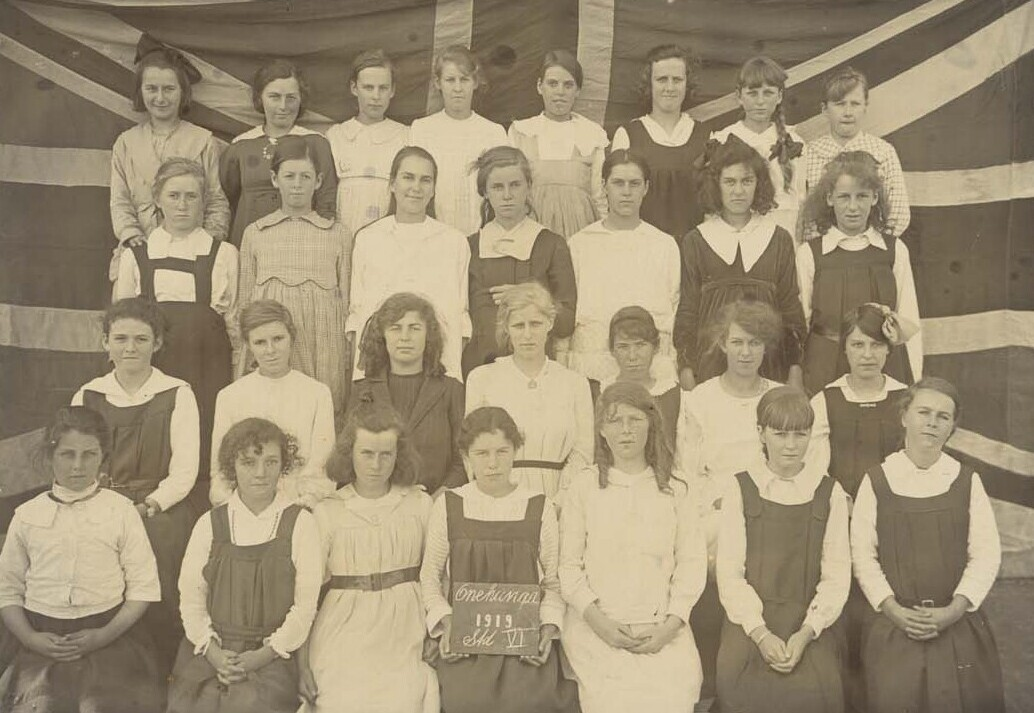

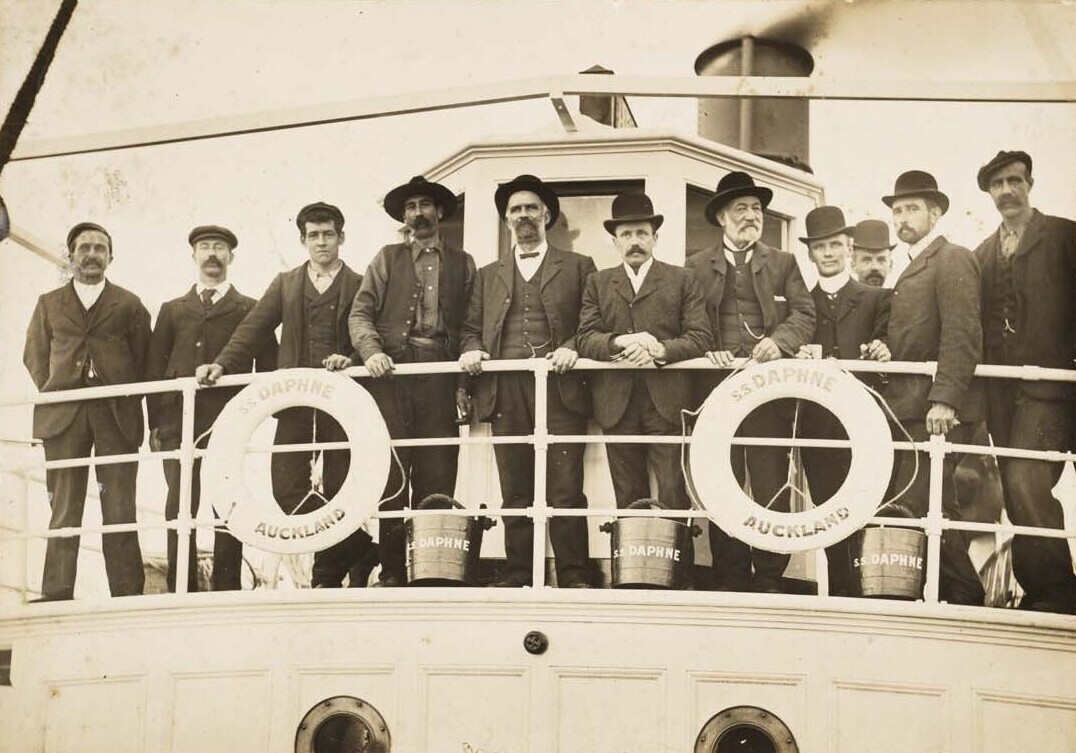

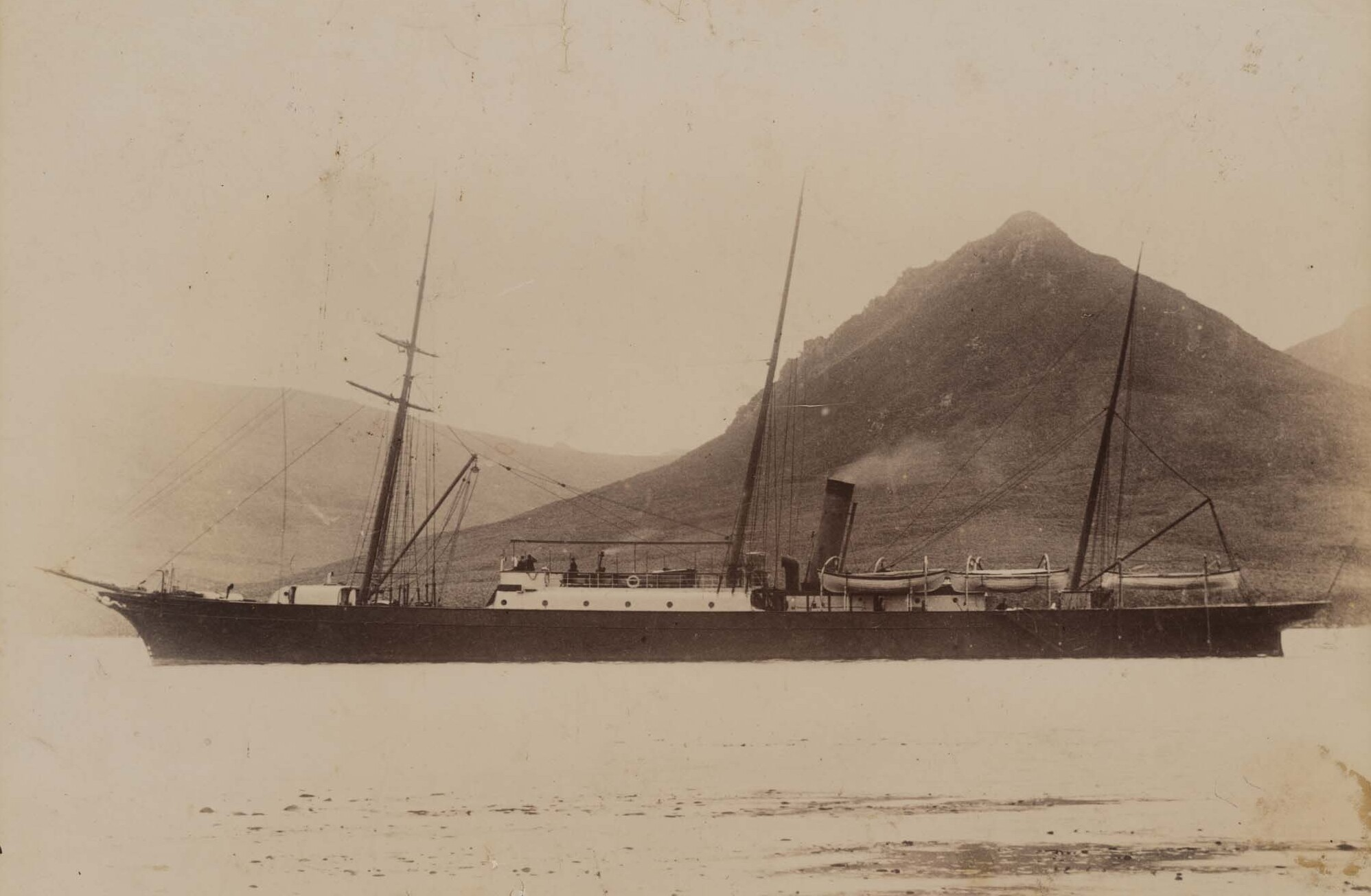

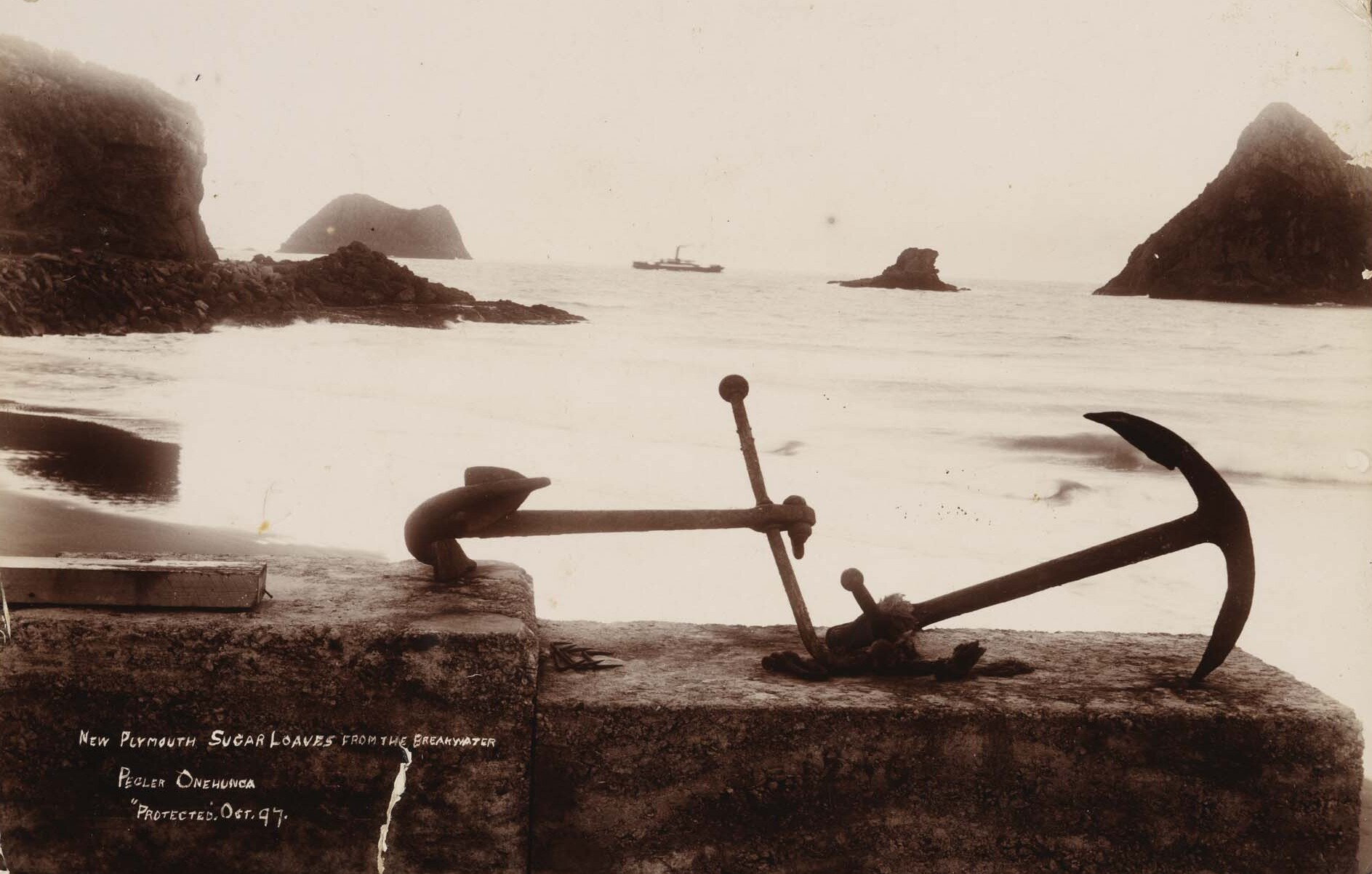

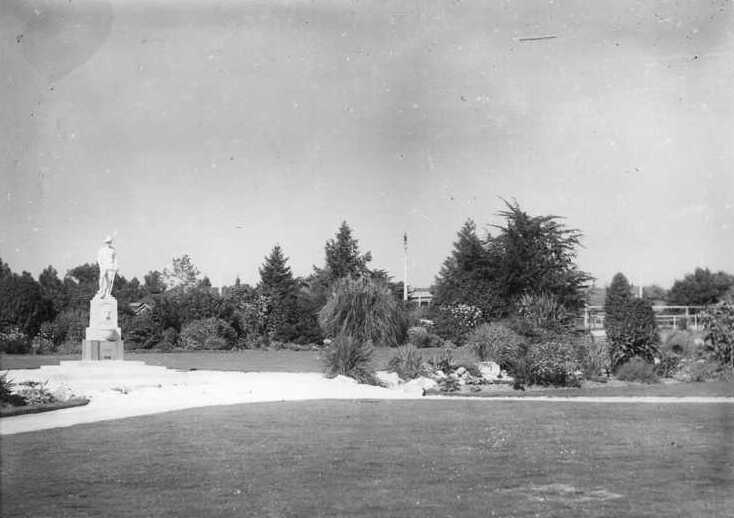
