= Franklin County, New Zealand =

Franklin County
- County of New Zealand
- 1912–1989
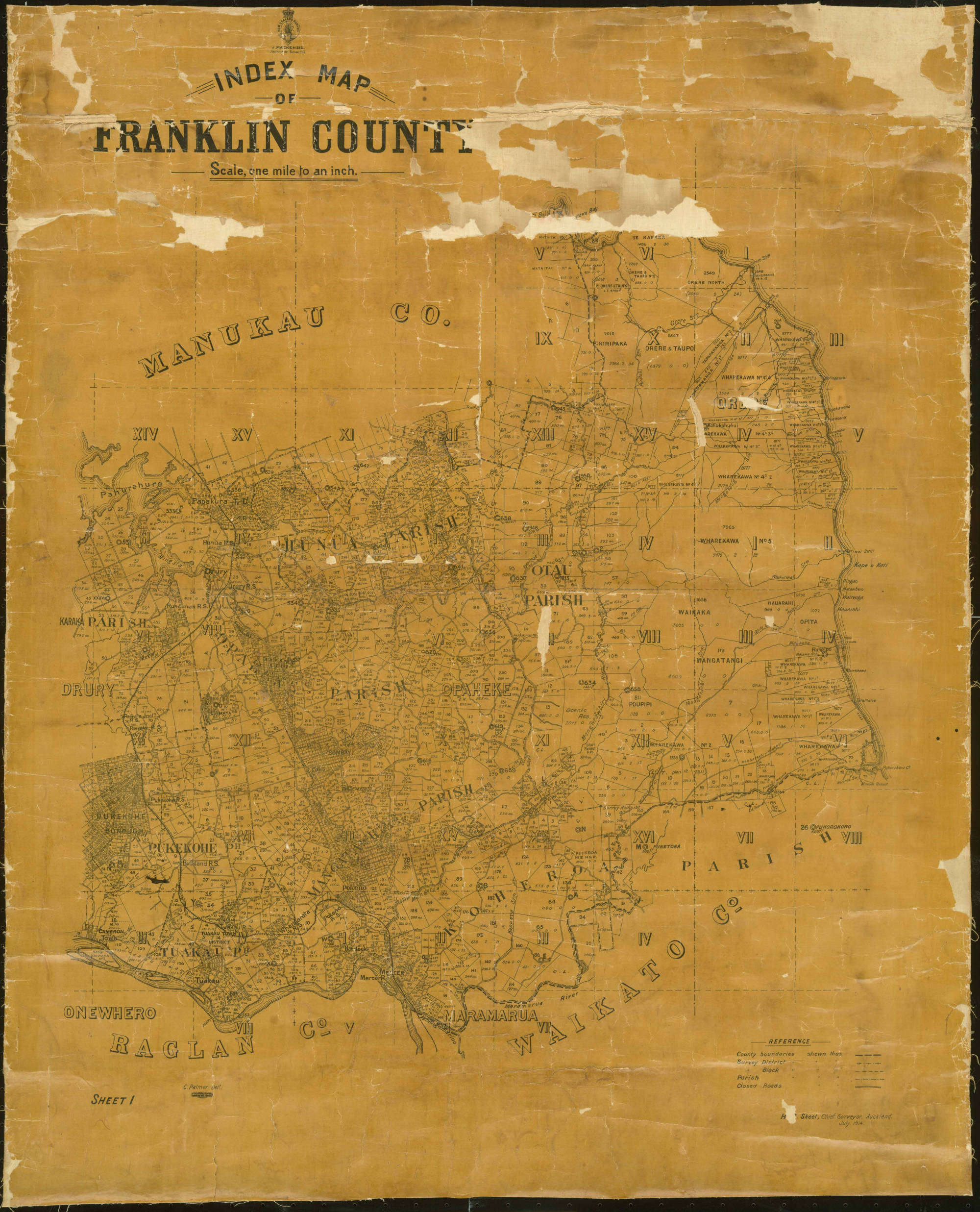
- Map of the eastern portion of Franklin County in 1914
- Capital: Pukekohe
- History
  - Established: 1912
  - Disestablished: 1989
- Today part of: Auckland Council, Waikato District

Franklin County was one of the counties of New Zealand in the North Island. It was formed following the 1911 Franklin and Manukau Counties Act and continued to exist until 1989 when most of the area became Franklin District.

== Etymology ==
Franklin County was named after the Franklin electorate. The electorate had been named in honour of Lady Jane Franklin, the wife of Sir John Franklin, the Arctic explorer. Lady Franklin had visited the Waikato Heads in 1841 when see visited the mission station of Robert Maunsell.

== History ==
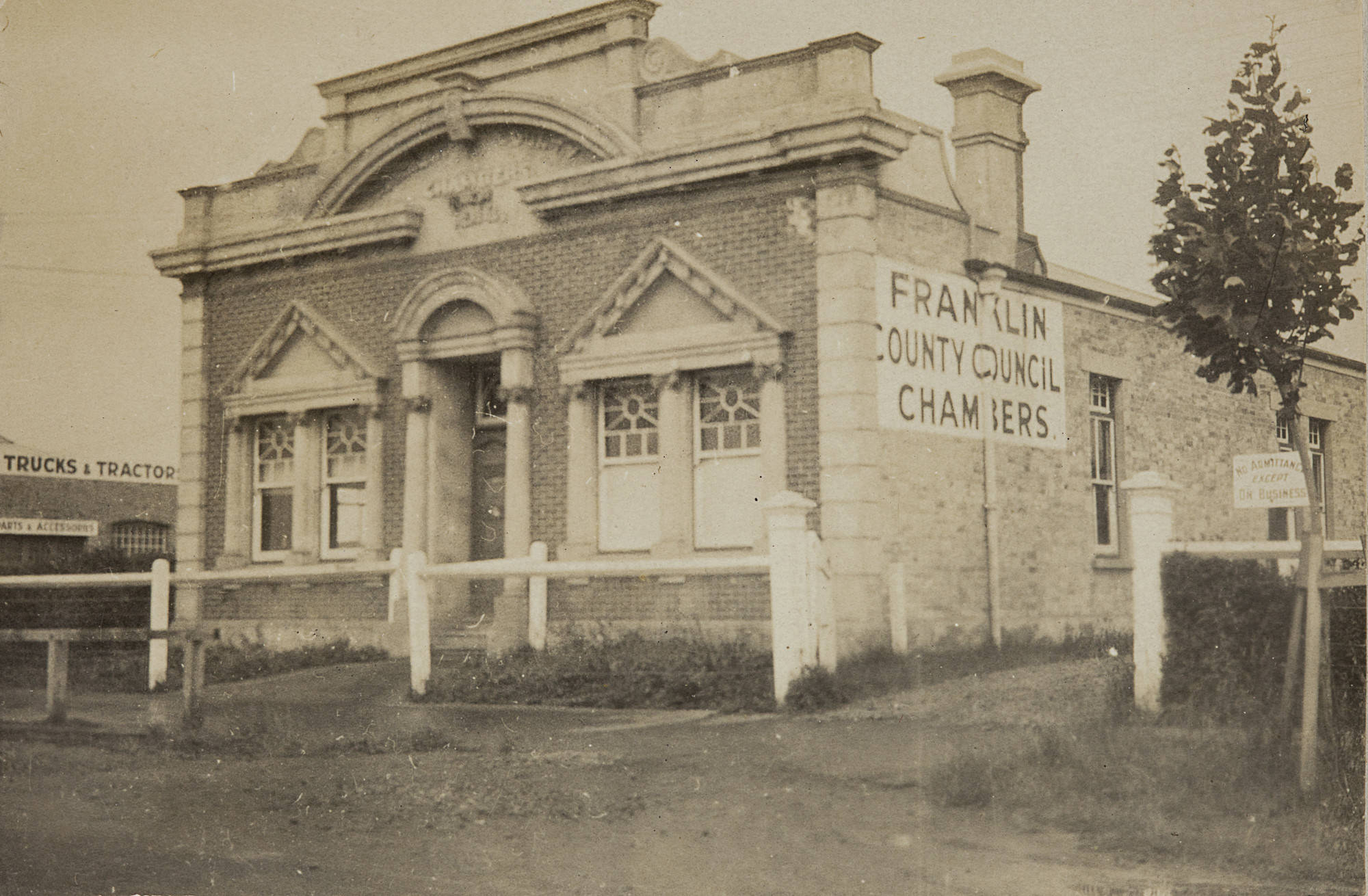
Franklin County Council Chambers in 1924

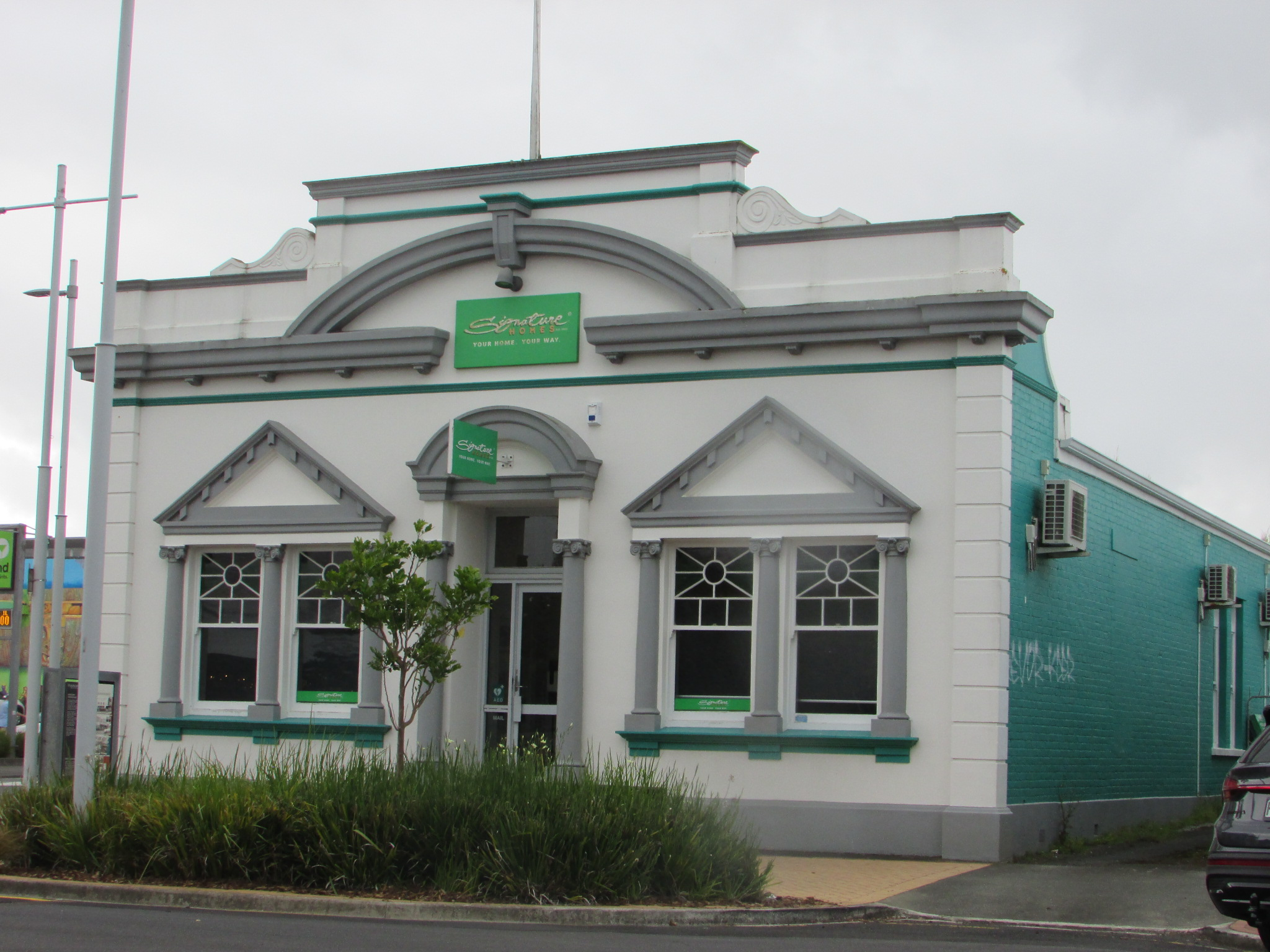
Franklin County Council Chambers in 2024

Franklin County was established on 1 April 1912, following the 1911 Franklin and Manukau Counties Act. Previously Franklin County was part of the larger Manukau County.

The first election for the Franklin County Council was held 22 June 1912. The first meeting was held in the Pukekohe Mason Hall on 4 July 1912. A permanent location was discussed at the meeting and the Buckland hall was offered but the council preferred to have their offices in Pukekohe. The council set about obtaining two quarter-acre sites at £425 and in 1913 hired local architect L. C. A. Potter to design the new council premises. The tender went to Macpherson & Harvey of Tuakau who finished construction in February 1914. The County held onto the building until 1972.

From 1913 to 1918 all 15 road districts merged with Franklin County. The county had eight ridings: Awhitu, Waiuku, Waipipi, Mauku, Pukekohe, Drury, Mercer, and Hunua.

In 1915 the approximate rateable value of the county was £3,500,000. In 1923 Franklin County covered 620 mi^{2} (1,600 km^{2}) and had a population of 9,730, with 183 mi (295 km) of gravel roads, 252 mi (406 km) of mud roads and 400 mi (640 km) of tracks.

Some urban areas were lost to the Papakura Borough in the 1960s.

In 1970 the county covered 350,720 acres (141,930 ha) with a population of 18,000.

== Chairmen of Franklin County Council ==
Eight men served as chair of Franklin County Council during its 77-year existence:

	Name	Term	Notes
1	W. Claud Motion	1912–1914	
2	Joseph Flanagan	1914–1917	
1	W. Claud Motion	1917–1924	Second period
3	Henry Wilcox	1924–1928	
4	Jack Massey	1928–1953	
5	R.W. Bennett	1953–1966	
6	P.M. Cochrane	1966–1978	
7	Richard Hoe	1978–1983	
8	D.M. McCartie	1983–1989	

== See also ==
- List of former territorial authorities in New Zealand § Counties
