= All Saints' Church, Howick =

All Saints’ Church, Howick
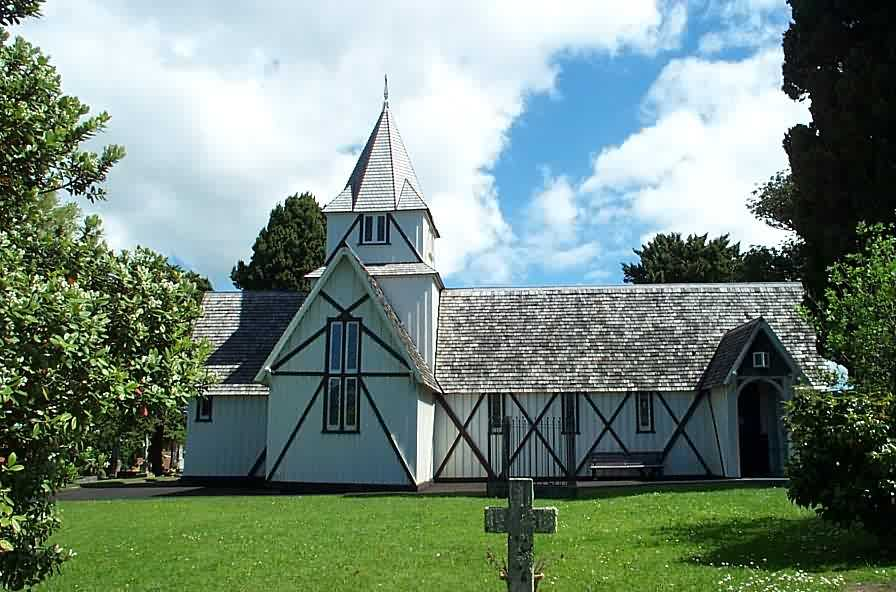
- All Saints’ Church
- 36°53′44″S 174°56′02″E
- Address: Cook Street and Selwyn Road, Howick
- Country: New Zealand
- Denomination: Anglican
- Website: allsaintshowick.org.nz

Architecture
- Architect: Frederick Thatcher
- Architectural type: Church
- Style: Tudor Revival
- Completed: November 1847
- Construction cost: NZ£147/3/9

Administration
- Province: Anglican Church in Aotearoa, New Zealand and Polynesia
- Diocese: Auckland
- Parish: Howick

Clergy
- Vicar: Rev. Ivica Gregurec

Heritage New Zealand – Category 1
- Designated: 7 April 1983
- Reference no.: 11

All Saints’ Church is a historic Tudor Revival Anglican church located in Howick, Auckland, New Zealand. Constructed in 1847 to a designed from Frederick Thatcher and located on a site picked by Bishop George Augustus Selwyn, it is one of the oldest churches in Auckland and is registered as a category 1 historic building by Heritage New Zealand.

== Description ==
All Saint's Church is a timber Tudor Revival church. It has a unique look due to a duplicated aisle and both a belfry and tower. The church is situated on an elevated position that overlooks the Hauraki Gulf.

== History ==
In 1847, Howick was established as a fencible settlement. In preparation for the settlement the government gave a grant of an acre to the Anglican Church. Bishop Selwyn picked the site himself and had Frederick Thatcher design it. The church was a prefabricated construction, with this taking place at the nearby St John's College before being moved via boat and later by hand to the site to be put together. It was the first building in Howick to be constructed and was completed before the fencibles arrived.

Originally built to a cruciform plan with equal span transepts, chancel and nave, with a tower. In 1862 the church was too small and the aisle was duplicated to extend it. In 1893 a belfry was added separate the existing tower. These modifications give All Saints' Church a unique look.

All Saints' Church is the only extant prefabricated Selwyn church.
