= Elizabeth George (businesswoman) =

Hotel owner, businesswoman, community leader

- Born: Elizabeth Rowe c.1814 Bodmin, Cornwall, England
- Died: April 4, 1902 (aged 87); Onehunga, New Zealand
- Occupation(s): Proprietor of Royal Hotel, Onehunga, New Zealand
- Years active: 1855–1909
- Known for: Founder and first President of Onehunga Ladies' Benevolent Society
- Spouse: Edward George

Elizabeth George (c.1814 – 4 April 1902) was a hotel owner, businesswoman and community leader in New Zealand. She was the founder and first president of Onehunga Ladies' Benevolent Society, one of the longest-running institutions of its kind with continuous public service.

== Life ==
Elizabeth George was born Elizabeth Rowe in Bodmin, Cornwall, England on c.1814. With her husband Edward George, Elizabeth emigrated to Auckland, New Zealand in May 1842. After moving to Onehunga in 1848, Edward purchased land and built the Royal Hotel on Princes Street. At Elizabeth's suggestion, he included a meeting room. The "Long Room" then served as the site for lectures and political meetings.

After Edward's death in 1855, Elizabeth continued as proprietor of the Royal Hotel and other local properties. In 1863, Elizabeth provided material support of food, clothing, and lodging for refugee settlers and advocated on their behalf. The result of this engagement was the establishment of the Onehunga Ladies' Benevolent Society.

Elizabeth died in Onehunga in 1902, aged 87. Elizabeth and Edward were parents to four sons.
