= St Peter's Church, Onehunga =

Anglican church in Onehunga, New Zealand

Coordinates: 36°55′21″S 174°47′06″E

St Peter's Church
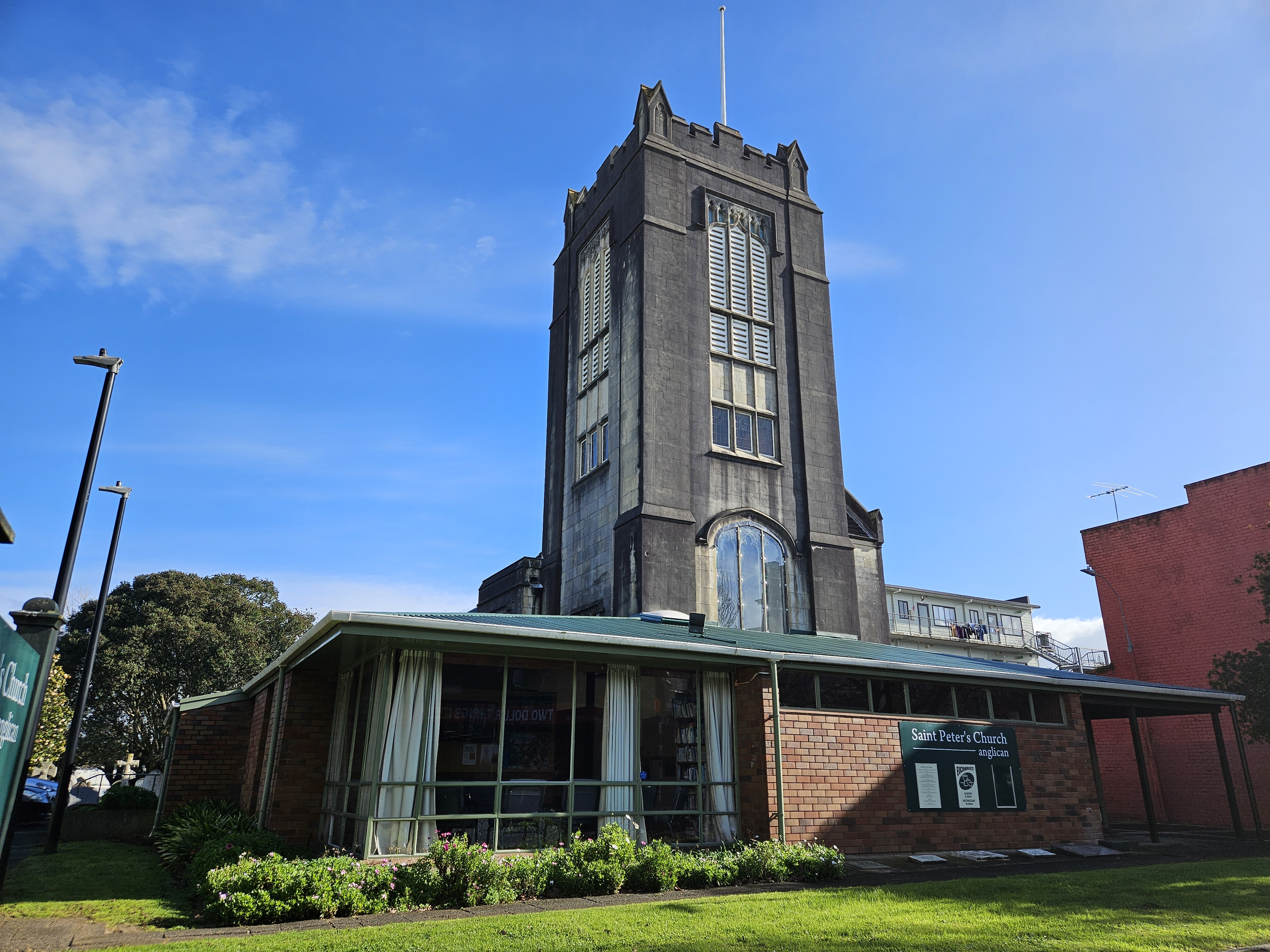
- Address: 184 Onehunga Mall, Onehunga
- Country: New Zealand
- Denomination: Anglican
- Website: https://aucklandanglican.org.nz/find-a-church/st-peters-onehunga/

History
- Consecrated: 28 June 1981

Architecture
- Years built: 1848, 1930

Administration
- Parish: Parish of Onehunga

St Peter's is an Anglican church in Onehunga, Auckland, New Zealand. Originally constructed in 1848, a new structure was built around the old church in 1930.

== Description ==
The original St Peter's was a Selwyn church and followed a cruciform plan, equal span to the nave and transepts. It had a high pitched gable roof and a central belltower. The windows were vertical with diamond panes and the interior boards were vertical. Horizontal bracing was visible on the external walls.

== History ==
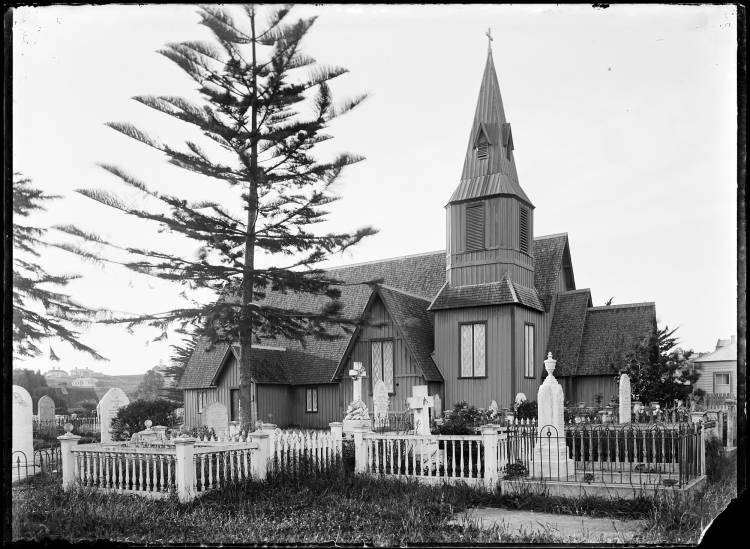
St Peter's church and graveyard, 1900s

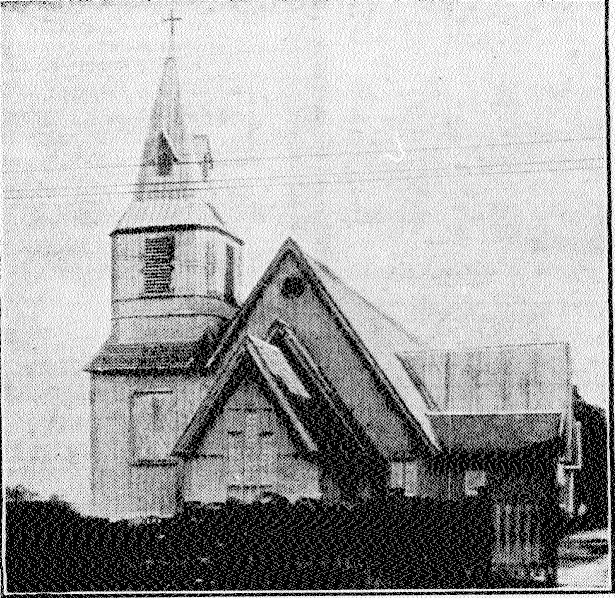
St Peter's church, 1928

In 1847 the site of the church was granted to the Anglican Church. Reverend Arthur Purchas was appointed to the Parish of Onehunga, which went as far south as Waiuku.

St Peter's church was designed and constructed by St John's College's building department, in a similar fashion to how All Saints' Church, Howick was constructed. Frederick Thatcher was the architect and may have been helped by Arthur Purchas. The first service was held on 29 June 1848. Further north to the church the vicarage and a school were constructed later the same decade. The church underwent two extensions for the growing population in the 1860s and 1870s.

In c.1858 the central tower was rebuilt to the side. This also led to the roof becoming much steeper. In 1903 a new site was purchased to build a new church, instead just the hall and vicarage were constructed. In 1930 a new stone chancel and tower were constructed with the wooden nave attached to it; the nave was the only part of the original remaining. Cyril Roy critiqued this, stating that the two buildings have nothing in common and the old church in the interior is out of place amongst the new building. In 1980 the construction of the modern building began. The wooden nave was dismantled. The new building was consecrated on St Peter's Day, 28 June 1981.

== Cemetery ==
The cemetery contains graves from victims of the HMS Orpheus and Niger, as well as that of Elizabeth Yates.

In July 2017, Keith Johnson, a homeless man, was found dead on a bench he frequented in the cemetery. A surfboard has been permanently attached to the back of the bench in his memory.
