= Fuller House =

Fuller House may refer to:

== Places ==
- Granville Fuller House, Aurora, Colorado, listed on the National Register of Historic Places (NRHP) in Adams County
- Montezuma Fuller House, Fort Collins, Colorado, listed on the NRHP in Larimer County
- John Fuller House, Suffield, Connecticut, listed on the NRHP in Hartford County
- Fuller House (Washington, D.C.), listed on the NRHP
- R. Buckminster Fuller and Anne Hewlett Dome Home, Carbondale, Illinois, listed on the NRHP in Jackson County
- W. Joseph Fuller House, Muscatine, Iowa, listed on the NRHP in Muscatine County
- Fuller House (Minden, Louisiana), listed on the NRHP in Webster Parish
- Fuller-Weston House, Augusta, Maine, listed on the NRHP in Kennebec County
- Fuller-Baker Log House, Grantsville, Maryland, listed on the NRHP in Garrett County
- Fuller House (Barnstable, Massachusetts), listed on the NRHP in Barnstable County
- Margaret Fuller House, Cambridge, Massachusetts, listed on the NRHP in Middlesex County
- Joseph Fuller House, Middleton, Massachusetts, listed on the NRHP in Essex County
- Lieut. Thomas Fuller House, Middleton, Massachusetts, listed on the NRHP in Essex County
- Amos Fuller House, Needham, Massachusetts, listed on the NRHP in Norfolk County
- Robert Fuller House, Needham, Massachusetts, listed on the NRHP in Norfolk County
- Capt. Edward Fuller Farm, Newton, Massachusetts, listed on the NRHP in Middlesex County
- Enoch Fuller House, Stoneham, Massachusetts, listed on the NRHP in Middlesex County
- William Griffin Fuller House, Stoneham, Massachusetts, listed on the NRHP in Middlesex County
- Fuller-Dauphin Estate, Taunton, Massachusetts, listed on the NRHP in Bristol County
- Fuller-Bemis House, Waltham, Massachusetts, listed on the NRHP in Middlesex County
- Pierce-Fuller House, Red River, New Mexico, listed on the NRHP in Taos County
- Royal K. Fuller House, Colonie, New York, listed on the NRHP in Albany County
- James and Lydia Canning Fuller House, Skaneateles, New York, listed on the NRHP in Onondaga County
- Fuller House (Syracuse, New York), listed on the NRHP in Onondaga County
- Fuller House (Louisburg, North Carolina), listed on the NRHP in Franklin County
- Fuller-Bramley House, Independence, Ohio, listed on the NRHP in Cuyahoga County
- Frances Ensign Fuller House, Madison, Ohio, listed on the NRHP in Lake County
- Fuller House (Utica, Ohio)|Fuller House, National Register of Historic Places listings in Licking County, Ohio|listed on the NRHP in Licking County
- Fuller Houses, Pawtucket, Rhode Island, listed on the NRHP in Providence County
- Fuller House (Euless, Texas), a Depression-era house museum in Tarrant County

== Television ==
- "Fuller House" (Full House), a fourth-season episode of the television sitcom Full House
- Fuller House (TV series), a Netflix sequel series to the sitcom Full House

== See also ==
- Full House (disambiguation)
