= Joseph Fuller =

Joseph Fuller may refer to:

- Joseph Fuller (architect) (born 1960), New York area architect
- Joseph B. Fuller, American academic and management consultant
- Joseph Jackson Fuller (1825–1908), Baptist missionary
- Joseph Fuller (musician), American pianist and composer
- Joe Fuller, American football player

== See also ==
- Joseph Fuller House, in Middleton, Massachusetts
- W. Joseph Fuller House, in Muscatine, Iowa
