= John Farrell (architect) =

New Zealand architect

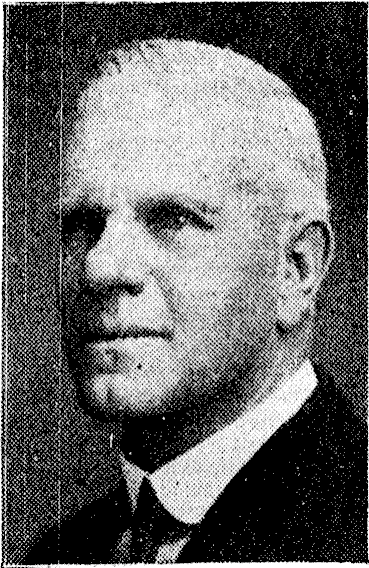
- John Farrell
- Born: 1868; Auckland, Colony of New Zealand, British Empire
- Died: October 19, 1938; Devonport
- Occupation: Architect
- Years active: 1907–c.1931
- Office: Mayor of Grey Lynn
- Term: 1904–1097
- Political party: Reform Party
- Other political affiliations: Conservative
- Practice: J. Farrell, Son & Glover.

John Farrell (1868–1938) was a New Zealand architect, businessman, and politician who served as mayor of Grey Lynn from 1904 to 1907 and as the Auckland Education Board (Note: The Auckland Education Board's boundaries are equivalent to the former Auckland Province and not the modern Auckland region or urban area.) architect from 1907 to 1924.

Farrell partnered with his son, Raymond Leslie Farrell, before partnering with William Henry Glover as J. Farrell, Son & Glover.

Several of Farrell's buildings have heritage registrations.

== Early life ==
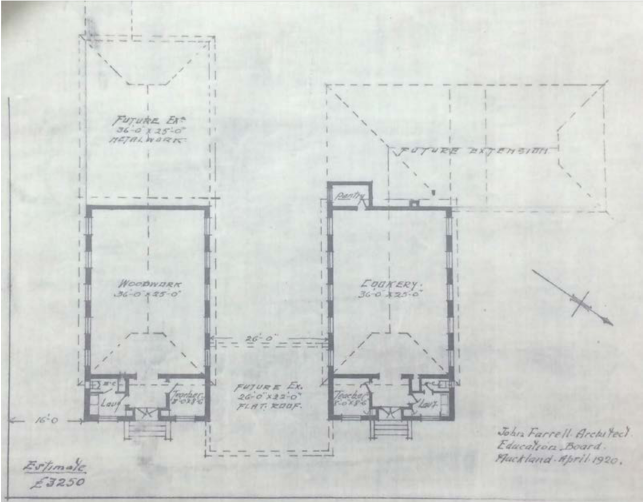
Farrell's plan for the Onehunga Manual Training School with future possible extensions shown. The extensions were never built

John Farrell was born in Auckland in 1868. He and his family moved to Thames where he lived until later returning to Auckland for university.

Farrell married his wife in 1892.

Farrell worked as a builder and contractor before working as an architect.

== Political career ==
John Farrell became a member of the Grey Lynn Borough Council in 1899 before serving as mayor of Grey Lynn from 1904 to 1907. He resigned from the mayoralty to serve as the Auckland Education Board architect.

Farrell unsuccessfully ran for parliament on two occasions. First as a Conservative in the Grey Lynn electorate in 1905, and in 1922, as a Reform Party candidate for the Auckland West electorate.

== Auckland Education Board architect ==
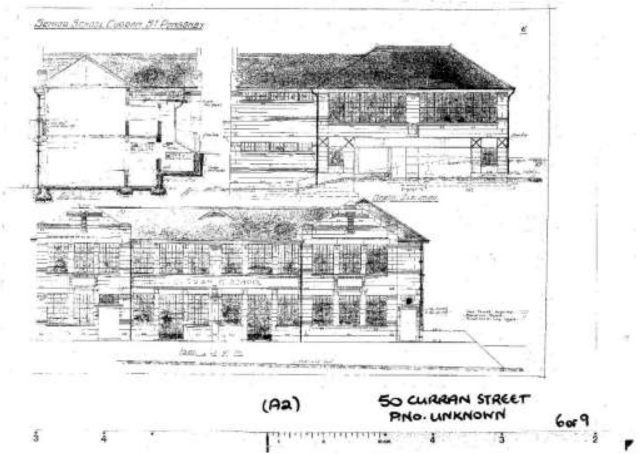
Farrell's plan for the Ponsonby School building

Farrell wrote in his application for the Auckland Education Board's architect role that he had trained under Robert McKay Fripp, George Selwyn Goldsbro', and Robert Martin Watt.

Farrell served as the Auckland Education Board architect from 1907 to 1924. Most his work in this role has not been identified with many of his buildings likely having been demolished for larger and more modern classrooms. Farrell made designs for buildings in Northland, Auckland, the Waikato, and the Bay of Plenty during his tenure.

Farrell's preferred style changed over his tenure; Farrell started with a 'floral Edwardian style' but by the inter war period his works were of a 'restrained stripped classical modernism' style. Farrell started designing more simpler and less detailed buildings in 1914 in line with contemporary architectural beliefs.

In 1919 Farrell designed three manual training schools at Onehunga, Vermont Street, and Avondale.

One of the last buildings Farrell designed as Auckland Education Board architect was the Ponsonby School at Curran Street. This building was innovative for the time with reinforced concrete posts and beam frames used to create large openings. This later became the standard for non-residential buildings.

Farrell resigned from his role in 1924 to travel the world with his wife and son before returning to Auckland in 1925.

== Later career ==
John Farrell partnered with his son Raymond Leslie Farrell and later they partnered with William Henry Glover in 1925 to become J. Farrell, Son & Glover.

In 1925 Farrell became the Auckland Hospital Board architect.

Farrell later served as a director of multiple companies and firms.

Farrell died at his home in Devonport on 19 October 1938 at the age of 70.

== Personal life ==
Farrell played rugby for the Auckland University College and was a member of the Auckland Boxing Association. He served as a president of the Auckland Orphans' Club and was a life member of the Old Thames Boys' Association.

== Legacy ==
Many of Farrell's buildings have been demolished. One of Farrell's buildings is registered with Heritage New Zealand and several have registration with Auckland Council and the Waikato District Council as historic buildings.

The Press Association of New Zealand described Farrell's designs as 'some of the finest school buildings in New Zealand'.

== List of buildings ==
Name	Date	Image	Note	Ref
Beresford Street School	1907		Likely the first building designed by Farrell in his role as Auckland Education Board architect. Registered as a category B building with Auckland Council. The building is now part of Auckland Girls Grammar	
Remuera Primary School	1909		Now demolished	
Stanley Bay School	1909		Farrell designed an alteration c.1916 and the date of construction falls within his tenure as Auckland Education Board architect. Registered as a category B building with Auckland Council	
25 Kerr Street	Before 1911		Was Farrell's private home from 1911 until his death. Modified significantly by Farrell. Registered as a category B building with Auckland Council	
Edendale School	1909		Demolished	
Grey Lynn School	1910		Demolished	
Hamilton High School	1911		Demolished	
Mt Eden School	1912		Demolished in 1963	
Gordonton School teacher's residence	1914		Registered as a category 2 building with Heritage New Zealand and category B building with Waikato District Council	
Glen Massey School	1914		Registered as a category B building with the Waikato District Council	
New Lynn School	1914		Demolished	
Maungawhau District School	1914		Demolished in 1976–1979	
St Heliers School	1915			
Meadowbank School	1916		Demolished	
Ohaupo School	1916		Demolished in 2015	
Horotiu School	1917			
Te Papapa School	c.1920		Demolished	
Belmont School	1920		Demolished in 1978	
Pipiroa teacher's residence	1920			
Waitahanui school building	1920			
Woodlands school building	1920			
Goodwood school building	1920			
Onehunga Manual Training School	1922		Registered as a Category B building with Auckland Council	
Vermont Street Manual Training School	Designed 1919		No longer in situ, presumed demolished	
Avondale Manual Training School	Designed 1919		No longer in situ, presumed demolished	
Ponsonby Primary School	1922		Registered as a category B building with Auckland Council	
Takapuna Primary School War Memorial Gates	1923		Registered as a category B building with Auckland Council.	
Hillcrest School	1923			
M.H. Walsh shops and dwellings	1926–1927		Registered as a category B building with Auckland Council	
Wilson Home bath house	Designed 1937			
Mt Eden Normal Primary School War Memorial Gates	1924		Possibly the work of Farrell. Registered as a category B building with Auckland Council.	
