= Full house =

Full house or Fullhouse may refer to:

== Film and television ==
- A Full House, a 1920 American silent comedy film
- Full House, a 1987–1995 American TV sitcom
- Full House (Armenian TV series), a 2014–2019 sitcom
- Full House (British TV series), a 1985–1986 sitcom
- Full House (South Korean TV series), a 2004 romantic comedy series
- Full House (Philippine TV series), a 2009–2010 adaptation of the South Korean series
- Full House (Thai TV series), a 2014 romantic comedy series
- "Full House" (The Upper Hand), a 1993 sitcom episode
- "The Full House", an episode of Jeeves and Wooster

== Literature ==
- Full House (manhwa), a South Korean manhwa series
- Full House: The Spread of Excellence from Plato to Darwin, a book by Stephen J. Gould
- Fullhouse (comic strip), a U.S. nationally syndicated comic strip by Harry Devlin

== Music ==
=== Albums ===
- Full House (The Dooleys album), 1980
- Full House (Fairport Convention album), 1970
- "Live" Full House (The J. Geils Band album), 1972
- Full House (Frankie Miller album), 1977
- Full House (John Farnham album), 1991
- Full House (Wes Montgomery album), 1962

=== Songs ===
- "Fullhouse" (song), a 1978 Kate Bush song off the album Lionheart
- "Full House", by Brett Young from 2.0
- "Full House", a Wes Montgomery song off the 1962 album Full House

== Sports and games ==
- Full house (poker), a type of poker hand
- Full house, a scoring category in Yahtzee
- Full house, or full count, a term in baseball and softball

== Other uses ==
- Full House (aircraft), a World War II bomber that participated in the atomic bomb attack on Hiroshima
- Full house (audience), full-capacity attendance at a concert, cinema or theatrical production
- Fullhouse (company), a marketing agency, subsidiary of Laughlin Constable
- Full House Entertainment, an Indian film production company
- M2 Fullhouse, a van manufactured by Mazda division M2 (Mazda)
- SGI Indigo², a 1990s workstation computer codenamed "Fullhouse"

== See also ==
- Ful Haus, a 2007–2009 Philippine TV sitcom
- Fuller House (disambiguation)
- House full (disambiguation)
