= Karangahake =

Karangahape
- Rural settlement
- Interactive map of Karangahape
- Coordinates: 37°24′58″S 175°42′55″E
- Country: New Zealand
- Region: Waikato region
- Territorial authority: Hauraki District
- Ward: Paeroa Ward
- Electorates: Coromandel; Hauraki-Waikato (Māori)

Government
  - Territorial Authority: Hauraki District Council
  - Regional council: Waikato Regional Council
  - Mayor of Thames-Coromandel: Peter Revell
  - Coromandel MP: Scott Simpson
  - Hauraki-Waikato MP: Hana-Rawhiti Maipi-Clarke

Area
  - Total: 6.40 km^{2} (2.47 sq mi)
- Postcode(s): 3674

Karangahake is a locality in the Hauraki District of New Zealand. In Māori, Karangahake translates as a "humpbacked ridge or a call from the other side".

== History ==
In 1915 a new Anglican Church and Sunday school was constructed.

== Demographics ==
In 1907 Karangahake had a population of c.3,000.

Karangahake is described by Statistics New Zealand as a rural settlement. It covers 6.40 km^{2} (2.47 sq mi) and had an estimated population of 390 as of June 2025, with a population density of 61 people per km^{2}. It is part of the larger Paeroa Rural statistical area.

Historical population
Year	Pop.	±% p.a.
2006	321	—
2013	297	−1.10%
2018	321	+1.57%
2023	381	+3.49%

Karangahake had a population of 381 in the 2023 New Zealand census, an increase of 60 people (18.7%) since the 2018 census, and an increase of 84 people (28.3%) since the 2013 census. There were 192 males and 189 females in 147 dwellings. 2.4% of people identified as LGBTIQ+. The median age was 51.9 years (compared with 38.1 years nationally). There were 69 people (18.1%) aged under 15 years, 24 (6.3%) aged 15 to 29, 189 (49.6%) aged 30 to 64, and 99 (26.0%) aged 65 or older.

People could identify as more than one ethnicity. The results were 92.1% European (Pākehā), 17.3% Māori, 2.4% Pasifika, 3.1% Asian, and 3.1% other, which includes people giving their ethnicity as "New Zealander". English was spoken by 98.4%, Māori language by 3.9%, and other languages by 8.7%. No language could be spoken by 1.6% (e.g. too young to talk). The percentage of people born overseas was 15.7, compared with 28.8% nationally.

Religious affiliations were 36.2% Christian, 0.8% Hindu, 0.8% Buddhist, 1.6% New Age, and 1.6% other religions. People who answered that they had no religion were 52.8%, and 6.3% of people did not answer the census question.

Of those at least 15 years old, 60 (19.2%) people had a bachelor's or higher degree, 171 (54.8%) had a post-high school certificate or diploma, and 81 (26.0%) people exclusively held high school qualifications. The median income was $31,500, compared with $41,500 nationally. 21 people (6.7%) earned over $100,000 compared to 12.1% nationally. The employment status of those at least 15 was that 126 (40.4%) people were employed full-time, 51 (16.3%) were part-time, and 6 (1.9%) were unemployed.

== Education ==
Karangahake school

Karangahake School was constructed in 1890. In 1907 the school roll was 500 and an addition of four new rooms was designed by John Mitchell to accommodate this. The school roll had dropped to 180 by 1919 due to the closure of the mines and subsequently two rooms were moved to Waikino. By 1943 only one room remained in situ.

Karangahake School is registered as a Category 1 building with Heritage New Zealand.

The school now has a roll of 49 as of July 2026.

== See also ==
- Karangahake Gorge
