= Educational architecture =

Architecture of school buildings

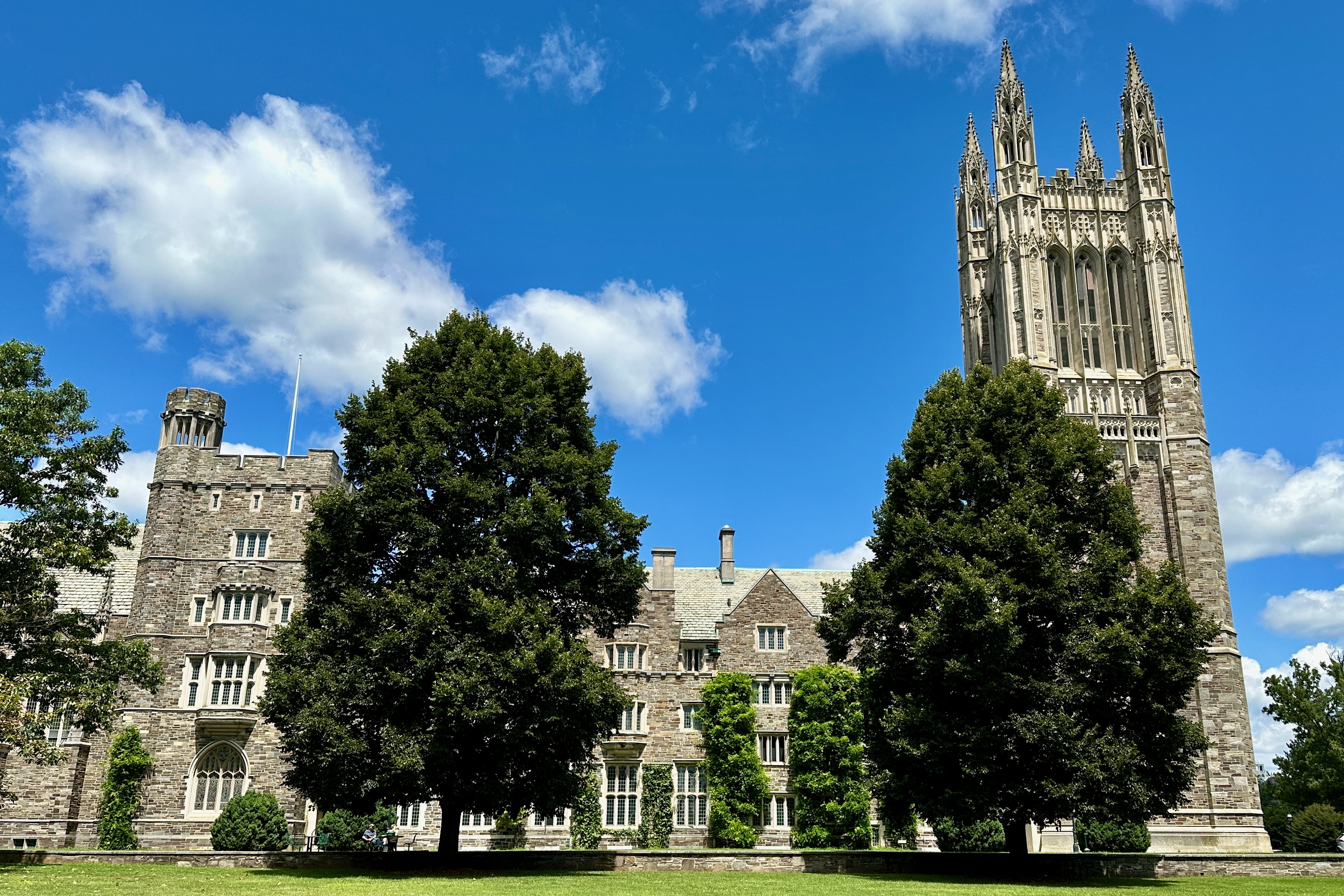
Princeton University Graduate College (1913), designed by Ralph Adams Cram in the Collegiate Gothic style

Educational architecture, also known as school architecture or school building design, is a specialized branch of commercial architecture where the building design is focused on the primary purpose of educational instruction, such as schools and universities, as well as other educational institutions. The design of a building can significantly influence the learning experience of students. Additionally, because schools are important sources of traffic, employment and community activities, school buildings often act as anchor institutions in neighborhoods or communities.

Various countries have gone through significant changes in philosophies associated with educational institutions, influenced by trends in investment by governments as well as larger changes in educational philosophy.

== Scope ==
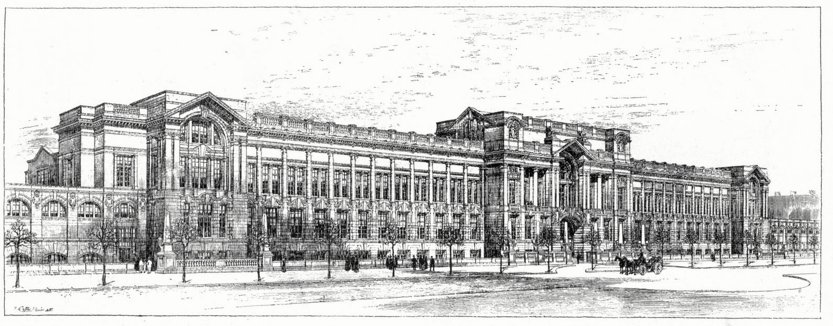
Academy Architecture of Royal College of Science (Imperial College London)

Though primarily dealing with the physical building where education is given, for example a school, educational architecture may also refer to the design of the education process. Both the methodical and the physical structure of education influence the learning outcomes.

Examples of educational architecture as redesign of the physical place are

- learning places instead of classrooms,
- applying standards for the indoor environment.

Examples of educational architecture as redesign of the education process are

- designing courses,
- the development of a virtual learning environment.

== Significant movements ==
=== Gothic and Gothic revival ===
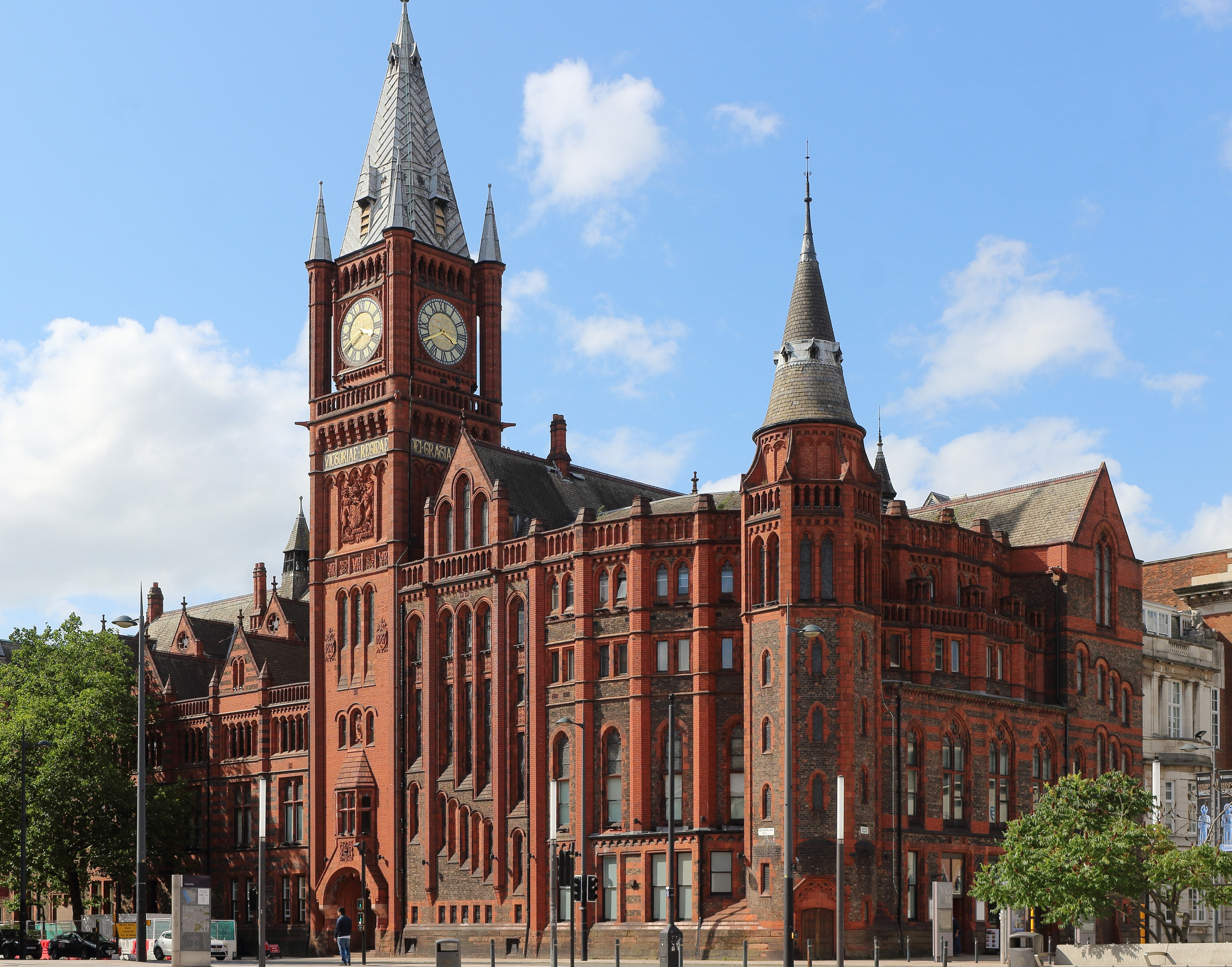
The Victoria Building at the University of Liverpool

The University Gothic style flourished in English universities in the 13th to 15th centuries, inspired by the Gothic architecture of monasteries and manor houses of the time. Important subgenres of the Gothic revival of the 19th and early 20th centuries in educational buildings were Collegiate Gothic, which was extensively used in North American schools and colleges, and High Victorian Gothic, which was used in English universities and colleges, particularly the redbrick universities named for their buildings in this architectural style.

=== Queen Anne style ===
Edward Robert Robson pioneered the use of Queen Anne style architecture for school buildings. Robson believed Gothic architecture's association with religion was inappropriate for secular education buildings. Robson's beliefs inspired the Auckland Education Board architects Mitchell and Watt who designed many Queen Anne style school buildings.

=== Brutalism ===
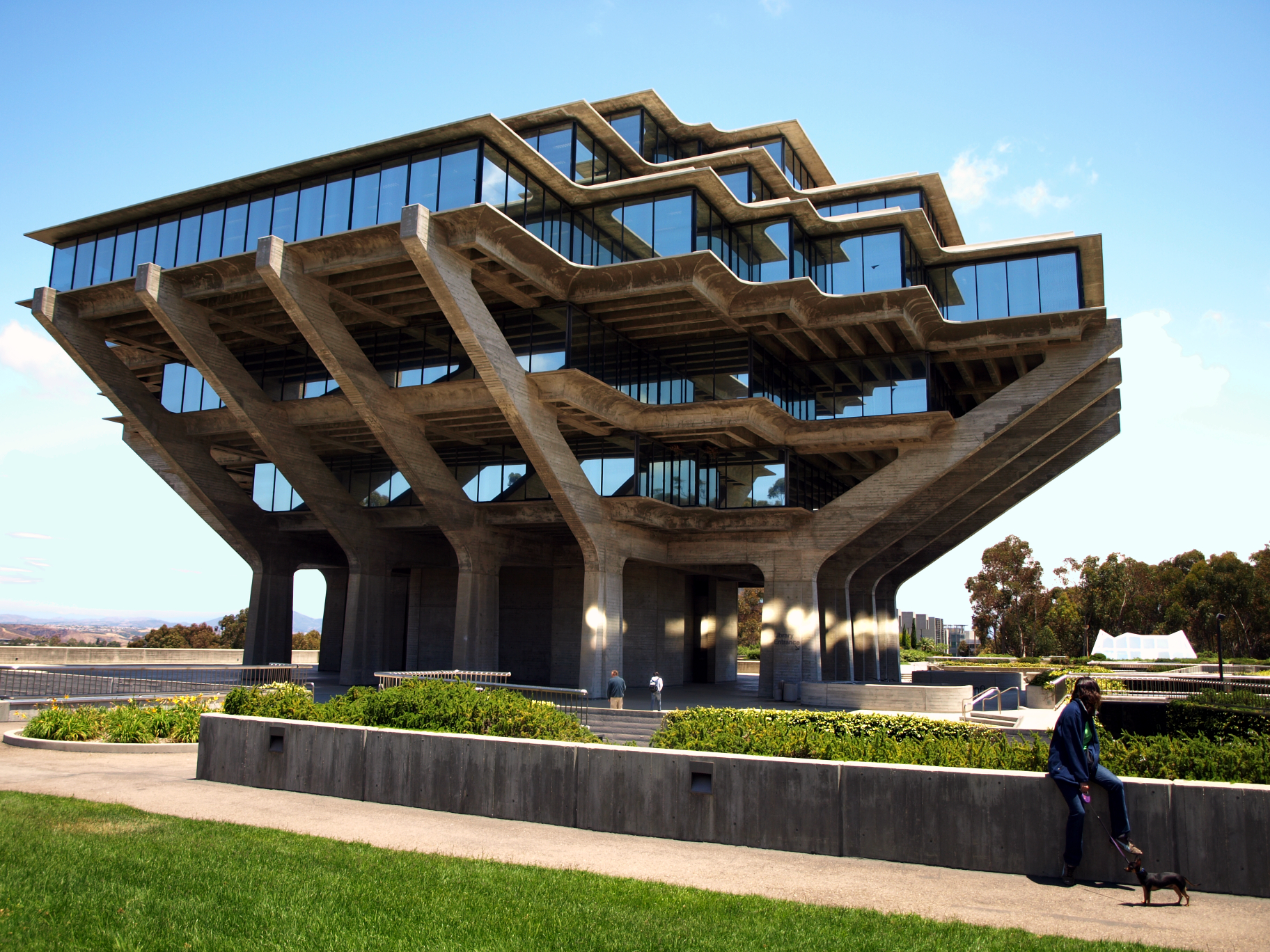
The Geisel Library at the University of California, San Diego

Brutalist architecture, characterised by minimalist construction showcasing the building materials and structural elements over decorative design, was extensively used on university campuses across the world in the 1960s and 1970s.

=== Open classroom design ===
An open classroom is a student-centered learning space design format which first became popular in North America in the late 1960s and 1970s, with a re-emergence in the early 21st century.

== Also ==
- Joseph Fuller, G. Topham Forrest, Sadie Morgan; architects specialised in educational architecture.
- Glenda Lappan, Robert Glaser; educational designers.
- Harvard Graduate Center; innovator of educational architecture
- The Children's Village at the Canuanã School; winner of the award "Best Building of Educational Architecture of the World" (2018)
