= Buckland, New Zealand =

Buckland
- Town
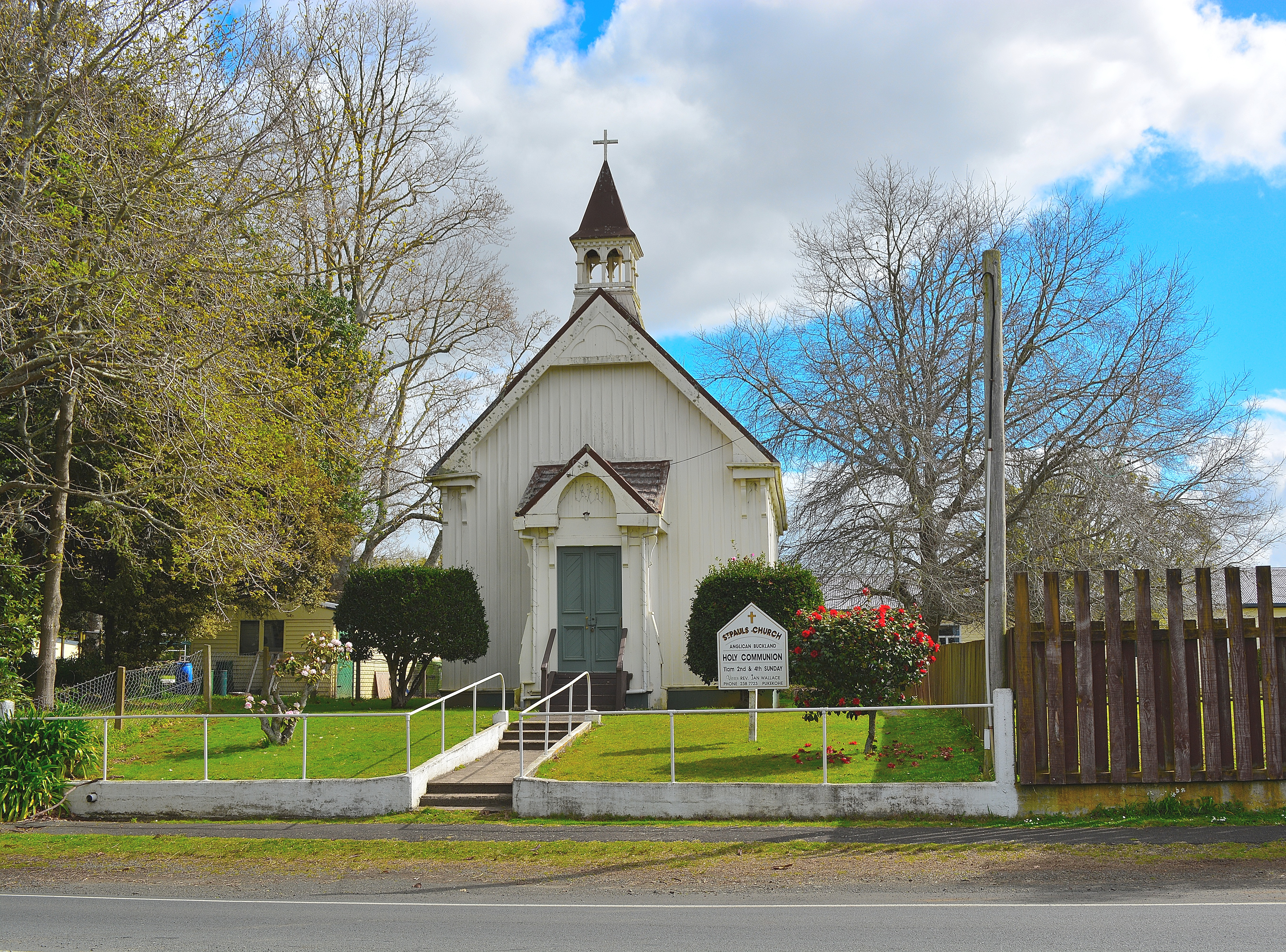
- St Paul's Church
- Interactive map of Buckland
- Coordinates: 37°13′34″S 174°55′30″E
- Country: New Zealand
- Region: Auckland Region
- Ward: Franklin ward
- Board: Franklin Local Board
- Electorates: Port Waikato; Hauraki-Waikato (Māori)

Government
  - Territorial Authority: Auckland Council
  - Mayor of Auckland: Wayne Brown
  - Port Waikato MP: Matthew Paul
  - Hauraki-Waikato MP: Hana-Rawhiti Maipi-Clarke

Area
  - Territorial: 8.46 km^{2} (3.27 sq mi)
- Elevation: 50 m (160 ft)

Population (June 2025)
  - Territorial: 1,250
  - Density: 148/km^{2} (383/sq mi)
- Time zone: UTC+12 (NZST)
  - Summer (DST): UTC+13 (NZDT)

Buckland is a small town in the Franklin ward of Auckland Regional Council, on the south-east side of Pukekohe, between Pukekohe and Tuakau, and on the northern boundary of Waikato District. It is part of the Pukekohe urban area.

== Etymology ==
Buckland is probably named after a local land owner. The 2010 publication, Place Names of New Zealand, says that was Alfred Buckland, but in 2017 the Specialist Built Heritage Unit of Auckland Council named William Buckland, brother of Alfred.

== History ==
Buckland was largely covered by bush until it was cleared to make room for dairy farms. In 1892 a creamery was operating in Buckland.

The construction of a railway line in 1875 allowed for the expansion of the agriculture and horticulture industry in the area, as produce could be easily sent to Auckland.

St Paul's Church was constructed in 1900 following the relocation of St Andrew's Church in Pukekohe. It is considered a landmark for the local community and is still in use.

A Methodist Church was constructed later in 1904. In 1984 the Church was sold into private ownership and is now a private residence.

Following the First World War many immigrants arrived in Buckland from Britain. A similar pattern of immigration would follow the Second World War but with Dutch immigrants.

== Transport ==
Originally only bridle trails connected Buckland with Pukekohe. Packhorses would deliver supplies from Drury.

Buckland had a railway station from 1875 to 1969.

== Demographics ==
The statistical area of Buckland, which includes rural land to the south and east of Pukekohe, covers 8.46 km^{2} (3.27 sq mi) and had an estimated population of 1,250 as of June 2025, with a population density of 148 people per km^{2}.

Historical population
Year	Pop.	±% p.a.
2006	969	—
2013	1,041	+1.03%
2018	1,173	+2.42%
2023	1,233	+1.00%
The 2006 population is for a larger area of 8.62 km^{2}. Source:

Buckland had a population of 1,233 in the 2023 New Zealand census, an increase of 60 people (5.1%) since the 2018 census, and an increase of 192 people (18.4%) since the 2013 census. There were 645 males, 588 females and 3 people of other genders in 414 dwellings. 1.9% of people identified as LGBTIQ+. The median age was 39.4 years (compared with 38.1 years nationally). There were 234 people (19.0%) aged under 15 years, 249 (20.2%) aged 15 to 29, 561 (45.5%) aged 30 to 64, and 192 (15.6%) aged 65 or older.

People could identify as more than one ethnicity. The results were 78.1% European (Pākehā); 15.3% Māori; 6.6% Pasifika; 13.9% Asian; 0.5% Middle Eastern, Latin American and African New Zealanders (MELAA); and 1.9% other, which includes people giving their ethnicity as "New Zealander". English was spoken by 96.1%, Māori language by 1.7%, Samoan by 0.7%, and other languages by 12.2%. No language could be spoken by 2.2% (e.g. too young to talk). New Zealand Sign Language was known by 0.2%. The percentage of people born overseas was 20.2, compared with 28.8% nationally.

Religious affiliations were 33.8% Christian, 2.4% Hindu, 0.5% Islam, 0.5% Māori religious beliefs, 0.2% Buddhist, 0.5% New Age, and 1.5% other religions. People who answered that they had no religion were 53.5%, and 7.1% of people did not answer the census question.

Of those at least 15 years old, 174 (17.4%) people had a bachelor's or higher degree, 573 (57.4%) had a post-high school certificate or diploma, and 249 (24.9%) people exclusively held high school qualifications. The median income was $45,800, compared with $41,500 nationally. 159 people (15.9%) earned over $100,000 compared to 12.1% nationally. The employment status of those at least 15 was that 555 (55.6%) people were employed full-time, 135 (13.5%) were part-time, and 30 (3.0%) were unemployed.

== Education ==
Buckland School is a full primary school (years 1–8) with a roll of 276. The school opened in 1894.

Pukekohe Christian School is a private composite school (years 1–13) with a roll of 323. It is about 1.3 km northeast of Buckland.

Both schools are coeducational. Rolls are as of July 2026.

== Other Bucklands in New Zealand ==
Buckland is also the name of small settlements east of Cambridge, in the Waikato region, and north east of Feilding.
