= Onehunga Primary School =

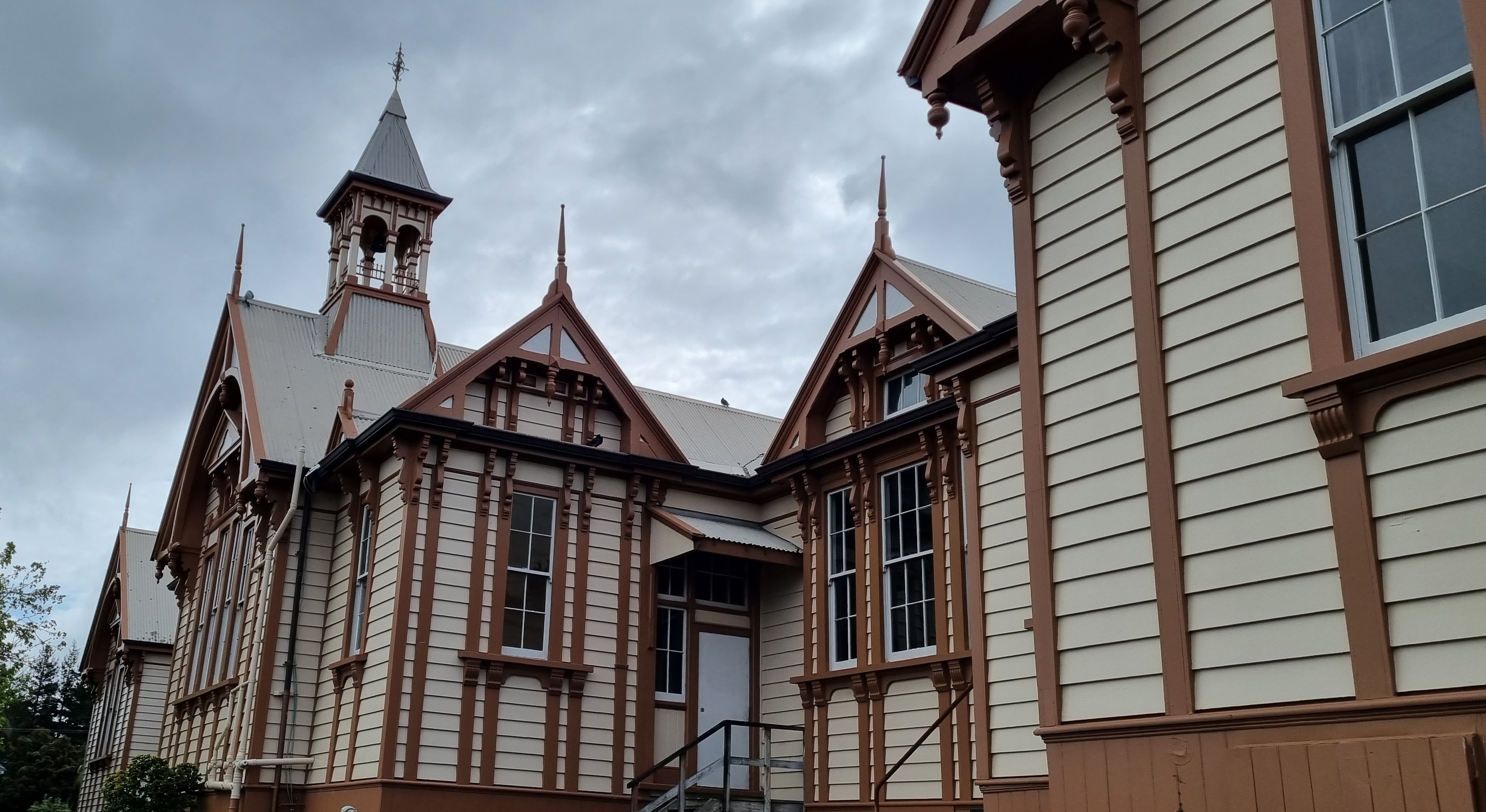
- Onehunga Primary School with belfry visible
- Former names: Onehunga District High School
- Alternative names: Onehunga Community House

General information
- Type: School building
- Architectural style: Queen Anne revival
- Location: 83-89 Selwyn Street, Onehunga, Auckland
- Coordinates: 36°55′11″S 174°47′00″E
- Year built: 1901
- Opened: 20 November 1901
- Renovated: 2005–2006 (exterior) 2007–2014 (interior)
- Cost: £2,374 and £60 for the belfry
- Renovation cost: $950,000
- Owner: Ministry of Education
- Operator: Friends of Onehunga Community House

Technical details
- Material: kauri

Design and construction
- Architect: Mitchell and Watt
- Main contractor: G.M. Handcock
- Known for: Former school and local landmark

Renovating team
- Architect: Antony Matthews
- Engineer: Colin Tunnicliffe
- Main contractor: John Mark

Website
- https://www.ochouse.co.nz/

Heritage New Zealand – Category 1
- Designated: 12 December 1993
- Reference no.: 7109

Onehunga Primary School is a historic former school building located in Onehunga, registered as a category 1 building. Constructed in 1901 as a district school before becoming a district high school, it later served as a primary school until the school moved to a new site in 1982. Initially planned to be demolished the local community had the building saved and it has become a community centre.

== Description ==
The Onehunga Primary School is a notable example of the Queen Anne style being used for an educational building in New Zealand. It is the largest extant school of the Queen Anne revival style in New Zealand.

The building has three main wings and two rooms at the rear. The gables have finials. The building originally had 7 classrooms, arranged symmetrically, a head master's room, and a teacher's room. One classroom doubled as a hall and featured the roll of honour. The building made use of an innovative techniques for ventilation and heating such as large windows, holes in the eaves for ventilation, and patented stoves and roof ventilation in the classrooms. Each classroom had its own entrance. Rooms were painted differently based on whether they were warm or cold. The hallways had washbasins for the students.

The building is constructed from kauri weatherboards and has a corrugated iron roof. There are boxed eaves and decorated brackets. The central window of the building is twelve-paned with two eight-paned windows each side. The interior has kauri walls and flooring.

A 6 m (20 ft) tall belfry is located on the central bay that projects outwards. A spire is positioned atop the belfry.

== History ==
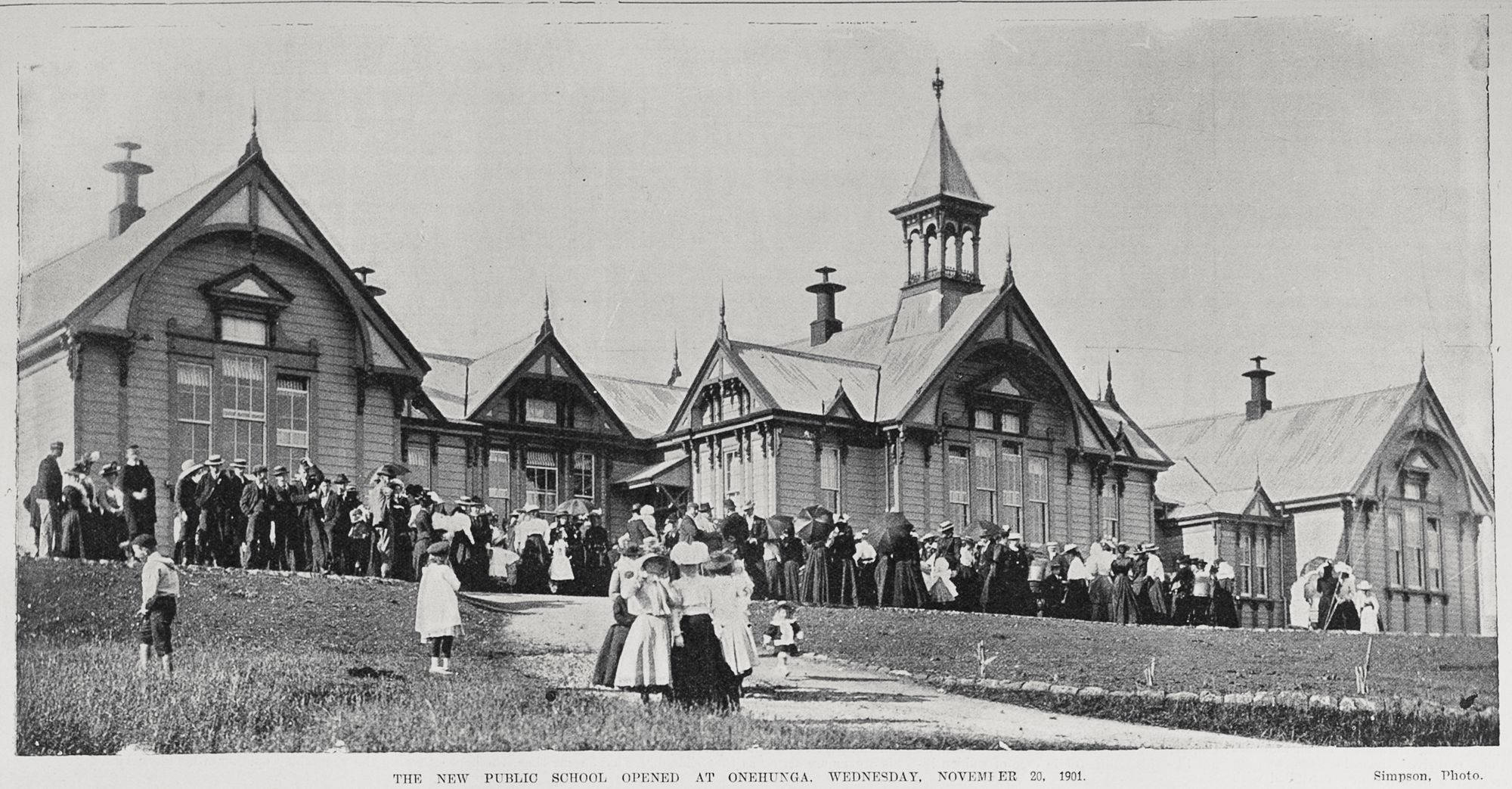
The opening of the new school in Onehunga, November 20, 1901

The first school in Onehunga was an Anglican school established in 1847. Further church and private schools were established over the years.

In 1873 the first public school—the Onehunga District School— opened in Onehunga and by 1876 this had moved to Selwyn Street. Following the growth of both Onehunga and education in New Zealand the school expanded and in 1899 added an infant block. The Auckland Education Board decided to construct a senior block on the most northern part of the site.

The Auckland Education Board architects, Mitchell and Watt, designed a Queen Anne style building. The building was constructed in 1901 by G.M. Handcock for a price of £2,374 with a cost of £60 for the belfry.

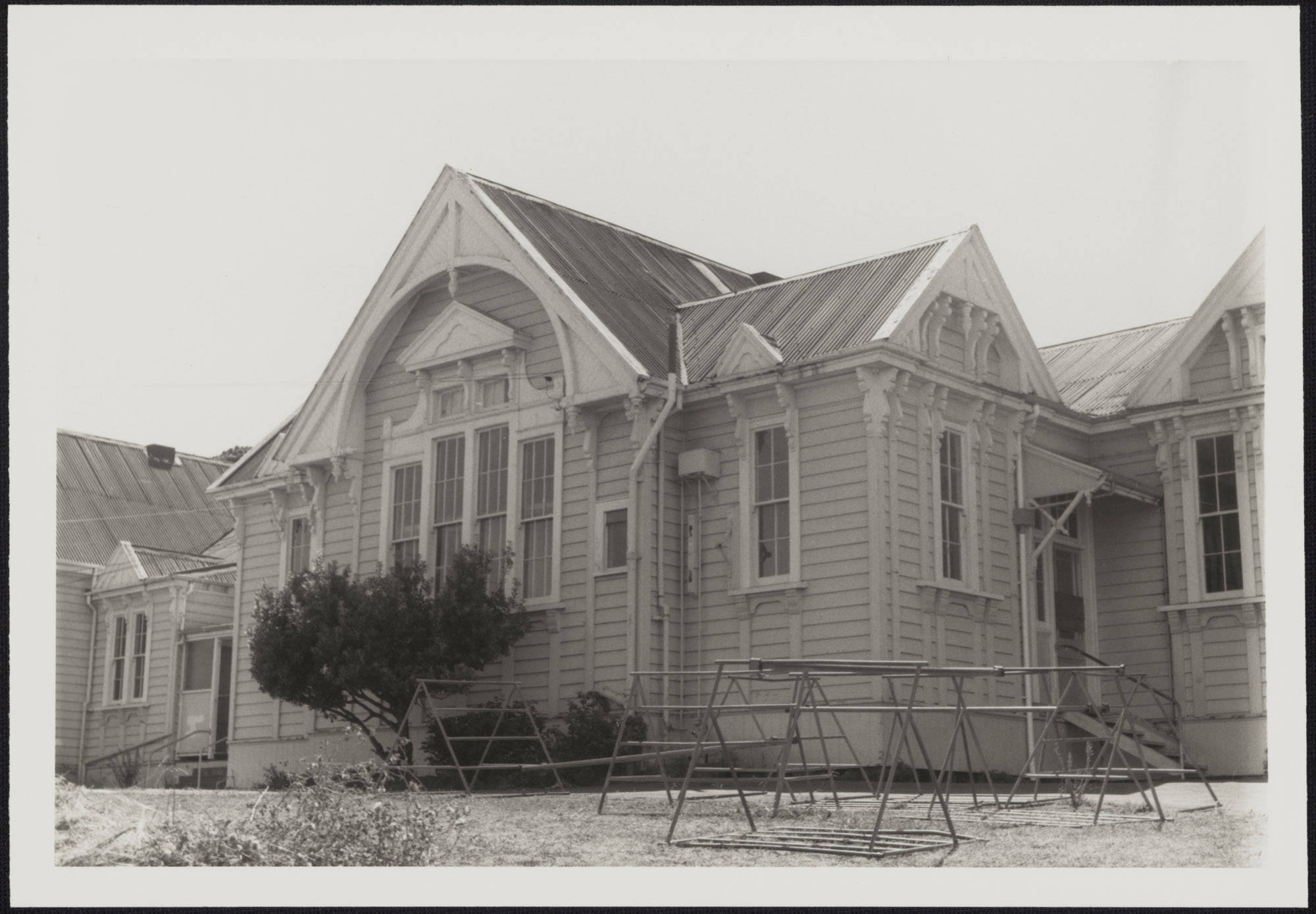
Onehunga Primary School in the 1980s

The school was opened officially on 20 November 1901. It taught up to standard seven. Previously local kids had to travel to expensive schools in nearby Auckland for further secondary education. Following the Liberal Government's reforms in 1900 that reduced the cost of secondary education there was a push to establish a secondary school in Onehunga. In July 1903 the Onehunga District High School was opened. This became the largest high school in Auckland Province with some students travelling from as far as Point Chevalier and Pukekohe. The school had reached maximum capacity by August 1904.

The Auckland Education Board decided in 1912 to close down the district high school and revert to a regular district school teaching up to standard seven. Part of the decision was grammar schools having free places for students who completed primary school. As education changed so did the needs of the school. A dental clinic was temporarily installed in a class room from 1929 and from 1930 a library and a special education class were established in the building.

The growth of the population around the school resulted in internal changes to the building. In the 1920s the school was 700–800, in 1936 it had 806 students, and by 1947 it had reduced somewhat to 529. By 1952 the building has 10 classrooms in addition to the existing headmaster's room, teacher room, and library. These changes limited the efficacy of the ventilation and heating systems designed by Mitchell and Watt. By 1939 the stove was replaced with gas heating and in 1955 that was replaced with a boiler. In 1960 electric lighting was installed in the building.

The building also underwent exterior changes. In 1947 the belfry was removed due to a leak. In 1957 the roof was replaced. Sometime prior to 1967 the finials were removed. In 1968—due to the increase in classroom numbers causing the size of the classrooms to fall below the minimum size requirements—the classrooms were extended. Fibrolite extensions were used to enlarge several classrooms alongside closing in the louvre windows and verandah. Large trees outside the school were cut down in 1961 due to the roots damaging the sealed ground.

By 1973 the building was too small and too old to accommodate the needs of the school. At this time the school had a roll of 370. It was decided to build a new school on the same site nearby. The building continued to be used until 1982, before the new school had been opened. Plans were initially to demolish the building but public support led to the principal of the school proposing the building becoming a community centre. In 1982 the building became the Onehunga Community House after the school moved onto the new site.

In 2001 the Ministry of Education attempted to sell the property and land. A trust, the Friends of Onehunga Community House Committee, took over management of the building and in 2002 started fundraising for a restoration. The restoration, led by Antony Matthews, was started in 2005 and ended in 2018. The committee had fund-raised $950,000 for the restoration. A replica of the belfry was installed with the original school bell included at a cost of around $100,000. The southern porch was opened up again and the finials were restored. From 2007 to 2014 the interior was restored with the walls put up to divide classrooms being taken down. The louvre windows were replaced with multi-pane windows that resembled the originals and a French door was installed to open onto the deck. Lean-tos which had been added onto the building were removed. Decorative elements such as the finials needed to be reconstructed based on old photographs and paint samples were analysed to determine the colours used originally. Copper gutters were installed to replace plastic piping. A former pupil commented that the restored building looked the same as it used to in 1923—when she first attended.

The building is now used for community groups but also houses a small museum relating to Onehunga and education in New Zealand.

== Significance ==
Onehunga Primary School has been described as the 'grandest' of Mitchell and Watt's Queen Anne style school buildings.

Following completion the Onehunga Primary School was visible as a landmark from all parts of Onehunga.

The Heritage New Zealand report states: 'The striking applied timbering and detailed bracket ornamentation on the main façade and belfry evoked civic pride in the institution and demonstrated the importance given to education by both the government and the local community.'

A scholarship for local primary students was established in 1922 by Euphemia Buchanan. Euphemia and her husband were local philanthropists. As of 2022 the Buchanan prize is still running.
