= Manual training schools in New Zealand =

Manual training schools were a form of vocational education in New Zealand for standards 5–6 (children aged 11–13) that had been established at the start of the 20th century. Although separate manual training schools no longer exist manual training has been absorbed into the general curriculum of New Zealand's education system.

== History ==
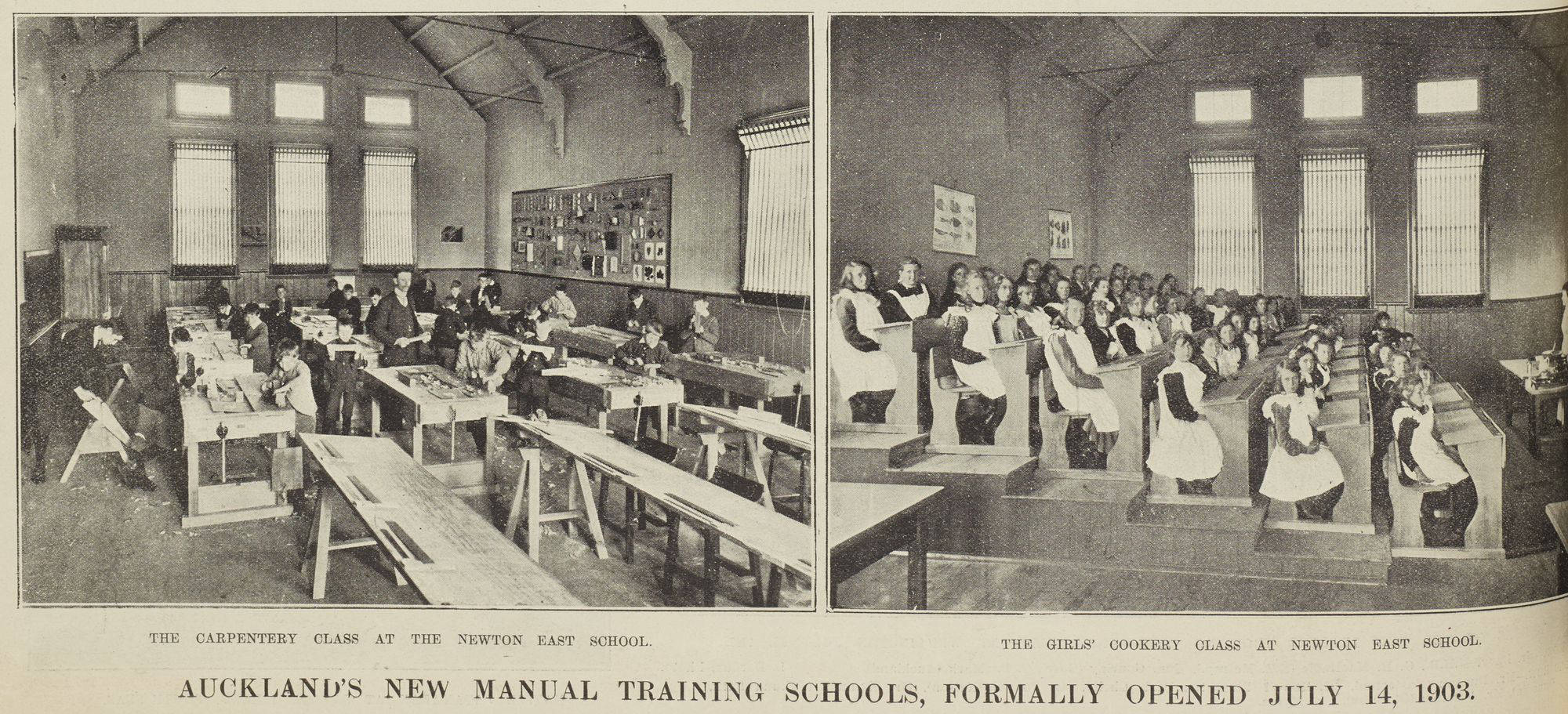
Students at the newly opened Newton East Manual Training School, 1903

Following the Education Act 1877 secular education was made free and compulsory for all children aged 7–13 across New Zealand. Since 1884 there were beliefs that academic education was not properly preparing children for the actual jobs they were to take up after leaving school. The Liberal Government of New Zealand passed the Manual and Technical Elementary Instruction Act 1895 to establish classes that taught manual and technical skills to students as part of the curriculum. This was not seen as enough and five years later the Manual and Technical Instruction Act 1900 was passed which established grants for the education boards to establish manual training schools as a form of secondary education. Most secondary schools did not wish to change their curriculum as the prevailing belief amongst teachers was in support of academic education. Two years later the government passed an amendment in 1902 which allowed for independent manual and technical training schools.

The first three manual training schools in the Auckland Education Board area (equivalent to the abolished Auckland Province) were established 2 July 1903. They were the Richmond Road Manual Training School, Newmarket Manual Training School, and the Newton East Manual Training School.

Manual training schools initially taught for Standards 5 and 6. Victorian ideals on education still dominated New Zealand society and this influenced the curriculum of the manual training schools. Initially boys were taught woodworking and metalworking and girls cookery, laundry, and sewing. As the schools expanded to teach younger kids other subjects were taught such as gardening and brushwork.

Manual training schools were found throughout the country. Early schools were established in Whangārei, Hāwera, and Thames; as well as around what is now Auckland. In Auckland manual training was offered at central locations such as Richmond Road (Ponsonby), Newmarket, and Upper Queen Street — with the idea that students could commute to them. As manual training grew smaller towns and settlements around Auckland began petitioning the Education Board for local training schools. For example, the Onehunga Manual Training School, located across the road from the Onehunga Primary School.

Manual training schools were still being constructed in the 1930s with tenders in 1935 showing schools planned for Ōpōtiki, Ruawai, Waiuku, and Te Puke.

Following the Second World War intermediate schools were established and took metalwork and sewing into their curriculum which made the creation of new manual training schools obsolete, despite this some facilities continued to be used into the 1980s.

== Extant manual training schools ==
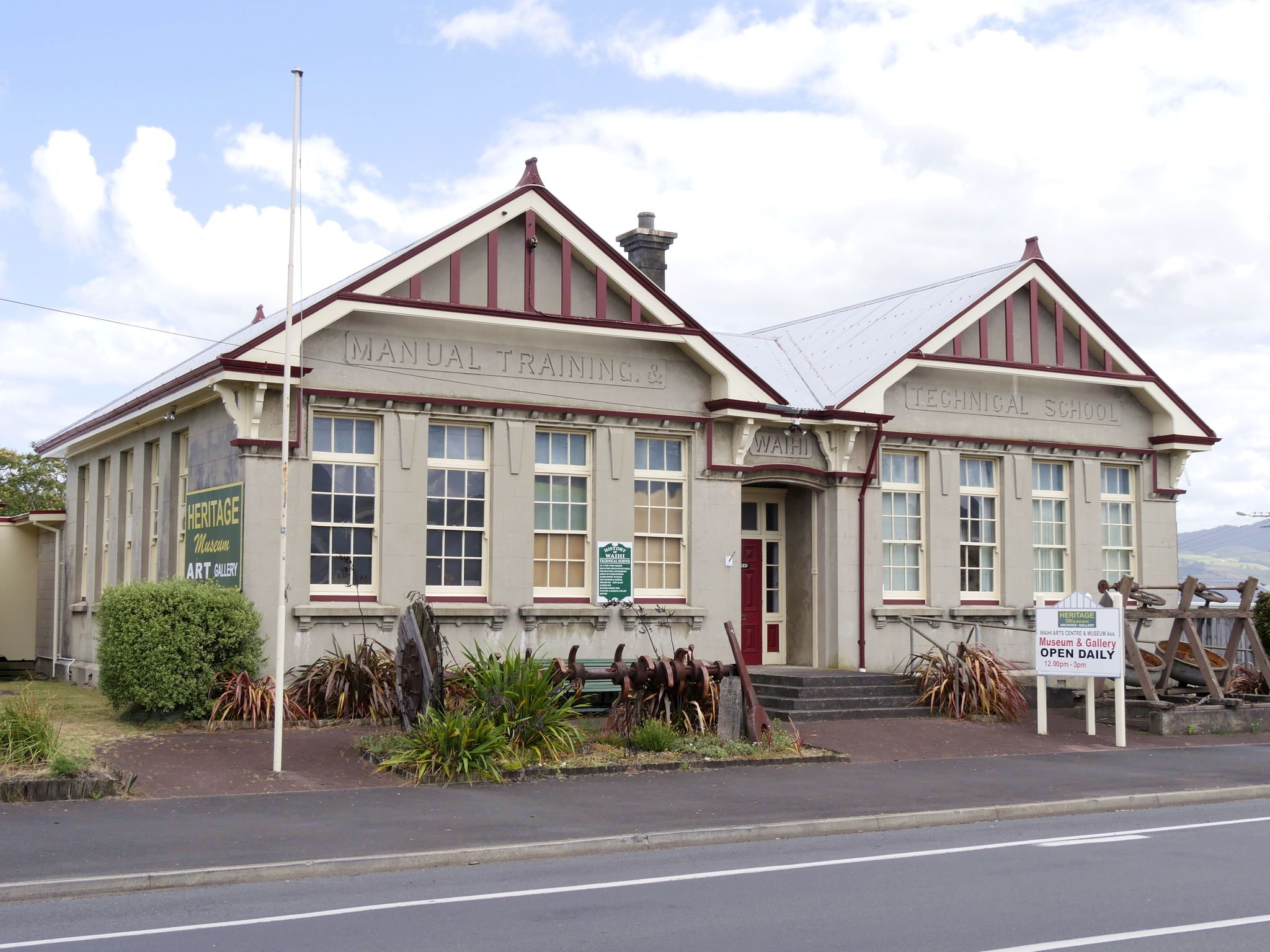
The Waihi Manual Training School has a category 2 historic listing due to its significance

Although many manual training schools have been demolished due to being obsolete some still survive with a couple having local historic protections.

These include:

- Richmond Road Manual Training The earliest manual training to open in the Auckland Province area it is now part of Richmond Road School.
- Newmarket Manual Training School Opened on the same date as the Richmond Road School it was later relocated and is now part of Newmarket Primary School.
- Otahuhu Manual Training School Opened in 1908 it now serves as the Otahuhu Primary School Technical Block for Otahuhu Primary School.
- Waihi Manual Training School Opened in 1913, it is recorded as a category 2 historic place as the Technical School and Portable Extensible Classrooms. It now serves as the home of the Waihi Arts Centre and Museum.
- Onehunga Manual Training School Opened in 1920 it is owned by KiwiRail and leased to private tenants.
- Paeroa Manual Training School Opened in 1925 it was relocated to the site of Paeroa College where it remains in use as an extramural building.
