= House full =

House Full or Houseful may refer to:

== Films ==
- Houseful (2009 Bengali film), an Indian Bengali-language film
- Housefull (film series), an Indian Hindi-language comedy film series
  - Housefull (2010 film), a film starring Arjun Rampal, Akshay Kumar, Deepika Padukone and Lara Dutta
  - Housefull 2, a 2012 sequel to the 2010 film starring Akshay Kumar, Jacqueline Fernandez, John Abraham and Asin
  - Housefull 3, a 2016 sequel starring Akshay Kumar, Abhishek Bachchan, Riteish Deshmukh, Jacqueline Fernandez, Nargis Fakhri, and Lisa Haydon
  - Housefull 4, a 2019 sequel starring Akshay Kumar, Riteish Deshmukh, Bobby Deol, Kriti Sanon, Pooja Hegde and Kriti Kharbanda
  - Housefull 5, un upcoming film in the series
- Housefull (2013 film), an Indian Malayalam-language film starring Tini Tom and Jyothirmayi
- House Full (1999 film), an Indian Tamil-language film starring R. Parthiban, Vikram and Roja
- House Full (2009 Kannada film), an Indian Kannada-language film

== Other uses ==
- House Full (TV series), a Bangladeshi dramaserial starring Abul Hayat, Mosharraf Karim and Nova
- House Full: Live at the L.A. Troubadour, a 1986 album by Fairport Convention

== See also ==
- Box office
- Full House (disambiguation)
