= St Paul's Church, Buckland =

St Paul's Church
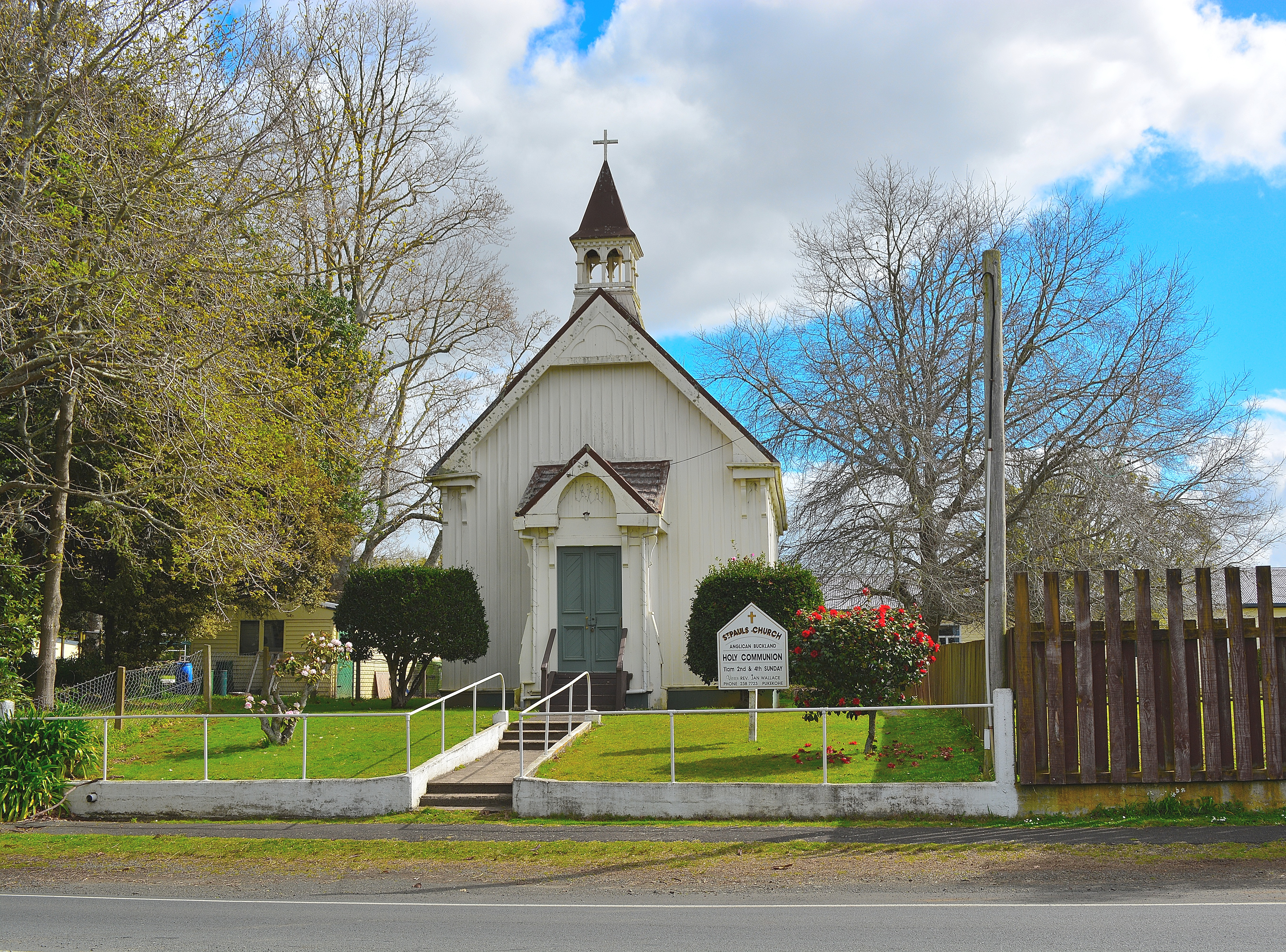
- St Paul's Church
- St Paul's Church
- 37°13′44″S 174°55′37″E
- Location: 581-583 Buckland Road, Buckland
- Country: New Zealand
- Denomination: Anglican
- Website: pukekohe-anglican.org.nz

History
- Founded: 23 March 1900

Architecture
- Heritage designation: Category B with Auckland Council
- Architect(s): John Mitchell, Robert Martin Watt
- Architectural type: New Zealand neo-Gothic
- Years built: 1899–1900

Administration
- Diocese: Anglican Diocese of Auckland
- Parish: Parish of Pukekohe

Clergy
- Vicar: Reverend Jan Wallace

St Paul's Church is an Anglican church in Buckland, New Zealand.

Buckland originally had no church and worshipers would travel to nearby Pukekohe for church; however, the relocation of the Anglican church in Pukekohe prompted Buckland residents to construct their own church.

The church is still in use and is considered a land for the community and a source of pride for locals.

== Description ==
St Paul's is situated on a 1,376 m^{2} (1.360 roods) lot. Behind the church is a small iron shed. The site has several mature trees on it.

Like many churches of the time it is split into three areas: the porch, the nave and the chancel.

The proportions, bargeboards, steep roof, trefoil detailing, and fenestrations suggest Gothic inspiration (Note: During the Victorian era there was widespread belief in the Anglican Church that only Gothic architecture was appropriate for Anglican churches. In England this usually took the form of Decorated Gothic architecture, but New Zealand lacked the materials and skilled craftsmen for this, leading to the more simplistic style of wooden church commonly seen in New Zealand. George Augustus Selwyn was also very influential in spreading this style, especially around the nearby Auckland area) for the architectural design. Other design elements such as a pediment above a window and the cladding of the exterior are reminiscent of Edwardian Classicism and Selwyn styles respectively.

St Paul's is a simple timber church built with a rectangular floor plan. The church has a steep gable roof. At the front is the spire and belfry. The belfry has trefoil fretwork and lancet (architecture) shaped openings. Tongue and groove boards are used for the gable. The porch has two wooden buttresses on each side. The sides have three windows each, with a trefoil detail over part of the tops of the windows. The interior is mostly intact with the internal timber still in good condition.

== History ==
In the 19th century Buckland lacked a church and residents travelled to nearby Pukekohe for worship. Anglicans would travel to St Andrew's Church in Pukekohe. In 1895 it was discussed whether St Andrew's should be moved closer to the town centre. The main opposition against the relocation was by Buckland parishioners. In December 1897 St Andrew's was moved to its current location on King Street. This required Anglicans from Buckland to take a longer and more uneasy terrain. During the discussions Buckland Anglicans had decided on funding their own church. The decision to build a local church was made by August, four months before the church was relocated. Prior to the church's construction the local schoolhouse was used for church activities.

After a site was purchased in October 1898, the architects John Mitchell and Robert Martin Watt came up with a design and plan. The church was to be 30 ft (9.1 m) long and 20 ft (6.1 m) wide with the stud being 12 ft (3.7 m), the chancel was designed as 14 ft (4.3 m) by 10 ft (3.0 m), and the porch was 6 by 6 ft (1.8 by 1.8 m) and the seating was to hold 80–100. The tender for construction was given to a 'G. Revell' of Tuakau. Following the laying of the foundation stone on 13 October 1899, enough donations were raised for a bell and belfry. On 23 March 1900, the church was opened with a dedication service taking place.

Some parishioners would travel from Pukekohe Hill to the church, finding the trip easier than St Andrew's in Pukekohe.

The Buckland district was merged into the Pukekohe Parochial District in 1905. In 1911 the adjacent lot was purchased for future expansion; however, by 1936 the community had not outgrown the church and there was a proposal to sell the land. In the end the land was retained and is used for farming and leasing.

In 1914, parishioners complained at a meeting that the vicar Dobson was not visiting Buckland often enough. Dobson, who had served as vicar for the Pukekohe Parochial District for 20 years later exchanged his position, possibly this was due to complaints from the Buckland parishioners.

A memorial lectern and a roll of honour to congregation members who died in service during the First World War was dedicated by Alfred Averill on 12 December 1919. Five years later, a memorial altar and reredos was dedicated on 20 July 1924.

Like many churches of the time, during the Great Depression attendance was poor and donations were limited. Further constraining the church budget was the focus of the parish on constructing a new church in Pukekohe.

In 1948, the spire and belfry were removed and replaced with copies as a repair and the windows had new glass installed. In 1950 the church celebrated the golden jubilee.

The church obtained £150 from the sale of a former church hall in Harrisville to Tuakau parishioners. The money from this sale was supposed to go towards an extension of the church for a vestry but instead laid dormant. For the 75th jubilee it was decided to withdraw the funds and use them to furnish a local rest home. Metal tiles were installed over the corrugated roof in c.1975.

In 1982, some discontent had grown between St Paul's and St Andrew's over the decline in churchgoers in Buckland. Many parishioners had blamed the changes to services at St Paul's for the decrease.

The church struck an agreement with Buckland School in 1991: in exchange for leasing the unoccupied lot (at no cost) to the school, the school would help with maintenance of the church. Not long after the church organ was repaired along with general repairs and repainting for the building.

In 2000, St Paul's celebrated its centennial with a service that had 170 people in attendance.

Since the 2010s numbers have decreased further in part due to increased traffic on the road, a lack of parking, and the lack of water supply. Some have proposed moving the church but as of 2017 this has not occurred.

The church has served other denominations and community groups over the years and is held in high regard by the Buckland community.
