= Buckland railway station =

Defunct railway station in New Zealand

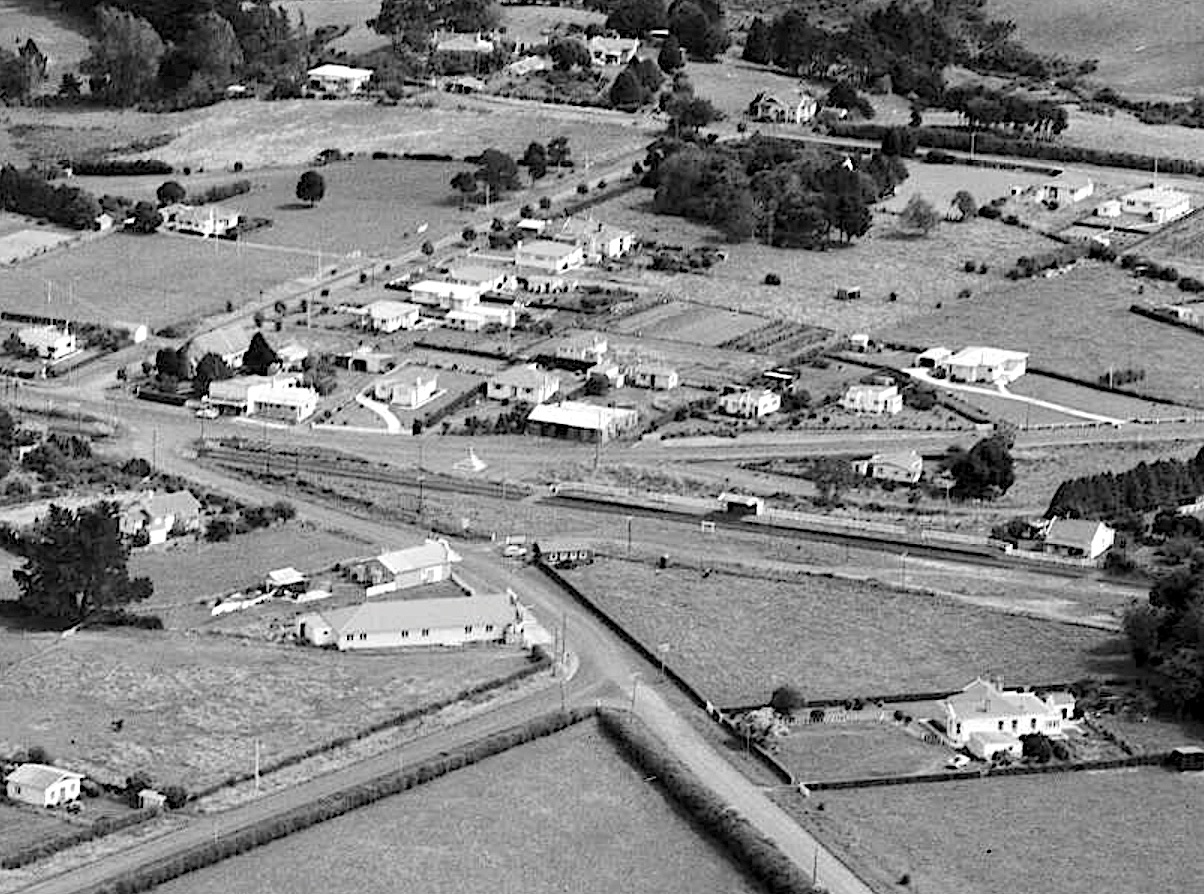
- Buckland in 1958

General information
- Location: Buckland Road, Buckland, New Zealand
- Coordinates: 37°13′37″S 174°55′40″E
- Elevation: 58 m (190 ft)
- Line: North Island Main Trunk
- Distance: Wellington 625.7 km (388.8 mi)
- Tracks: doubled 21 November 1954

History
- Opened: 20 May 1875
- Closed: 2 February 1969

Services
Preceding station	Historical railways	Following station
Pukekohe; Line open, station open 3.06 km (1.90 mi)	North Island Main Trunk; KiwiRail	Tuakau; Line open, station closed 4.39 km (2.73 mi)
Location

Buckland railway station was a station on the North Island Main Trunk in New Zealand, serving the Buckland settlement south of Pukekohe.

Buckland was initially a flag station, 33 mi (53 km) south of Auckland. The station opened on 20 May 1875, closed to goods on 19 December 1954, and to passengers and all traffic on 2 February 1969. It was only once considered important enough to be included in the annual returns of stations.

== History ==
By September 1878 Bucklands had a 6th class passenger station and in 1879 a stationmaster's house and 40 ft (12 m) x 30 ft (9.1 m) goods shed were added. There was also a shelter shed, passenger platform, cart approach to platform, loading bank, cattle yards, urinals and a passing loop for 34 wagons. About 1911 the loop was extended to 66 wagons, and in 1912 the line to Tuakau had 10 curves of 10 to 24 ch (1,600 ft; 480 m) radius, reduced to three 30 ch (2,000 ft; 600 m) curves, and the gradient eased from 1 in 40 to 1 in 100, at a cost of £11,000. A veranda was added in 1913. In 1897 it was noted a lamp was needed. However, in 1928 there was a complaint of the platform being too short and the station being unlit. Southern Line fares were extended to Buckland and Tuakau in 1929.

In December 1954 it was noted that the goods shed and siding would shortly be removed and by June 1955 the siding had been removed to allow doubling of the line between Paerata and Tuakau.
