= Robert Fuller House =

Historic house in Massachusetts, United States

- U.S. National Register of Historic Places
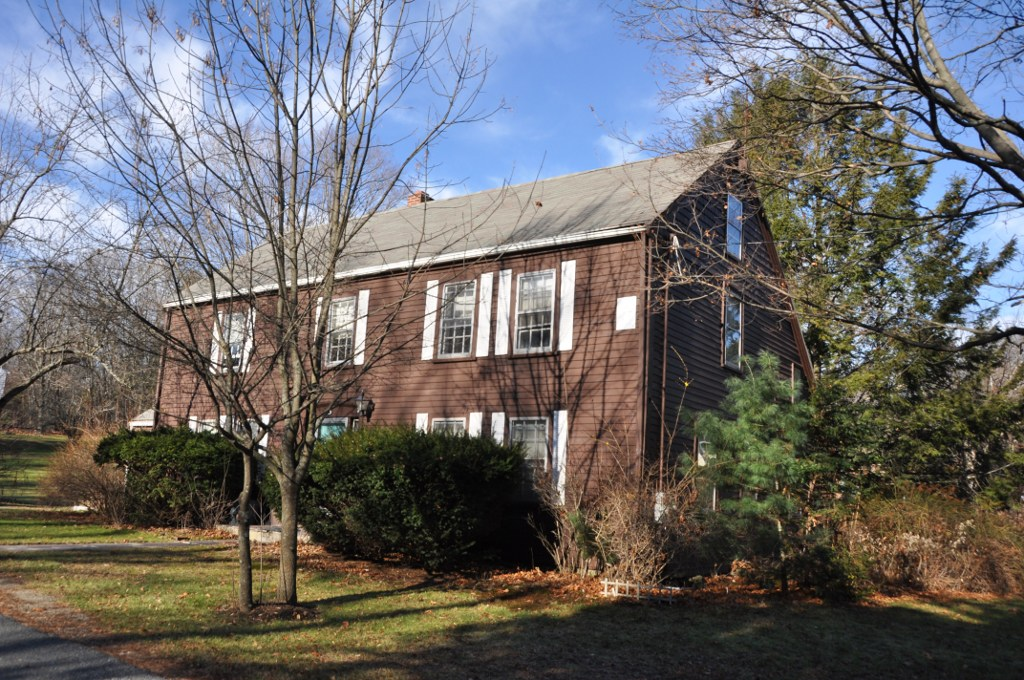

- Location within Massachusetts Location within the United States
- Location: Needham, Massachusetts
- Coordinates: 42°17′37″N 71°15′27″W
- Area: less than one acre
- Built: 1707
- NRHP reference No.: 87001476
- Added to NRHP: September 8, 1987

The Robert Fuller House is a historic house at 3 Burrill Lane in Needham, Massachusetts. Built in 1707 and moved to its present location in 1750, it is the oldest house in Needham. It is a well-preserved example of First Period architecture, adaptively modified over the centuries to adapt to later uses. The house was listed on the National Register of Historic Places in 1987.

== Description and history ==
The Fuller House stands at the northwest corner of Burrill Lane and Forest Street in northwestern Needham. The area is, like much of the town, now a residential suburban area. The house is a 2 1/2-story wood-frame structure, five bays wide, with a side-gable roof and a sloping rear leanto section, giving the house a classic saltbox profile. Additions extend to the left and rear of the main block. The house exterior is finished in clapboards, and the sole chimney is placed off-center behind the ridge line. The interior has a typical center-chimney plan, with a narrow winding stairway in the front vestibule, in front of the original central chimney.

The house was built in 1707 by Robert Fuller, a prominent local resident from one of the area's early families. It originally stood where 46 Burrill Lane is, and was moved by Fuller in 1750 to its present location to make way for a new house. It is the oldest house in Needham. As built in 1707, it was a typical double-pile house with central chimney; the leanto was added after the house was moved. IN 1823 it was sold out of the Fuller family to the Greenwoods, who owned it until 1896. In the early 20th century, the additions were made to the side and rear, and the central chimney replaced by the present one.

== See also ==
- National Register of Historic Places listings in Norfolk County, Massachusetts
