= Fuller-Dauphin Estate =

Historic house in Massachusetts, United States

- U.S. National Register of Historic Places
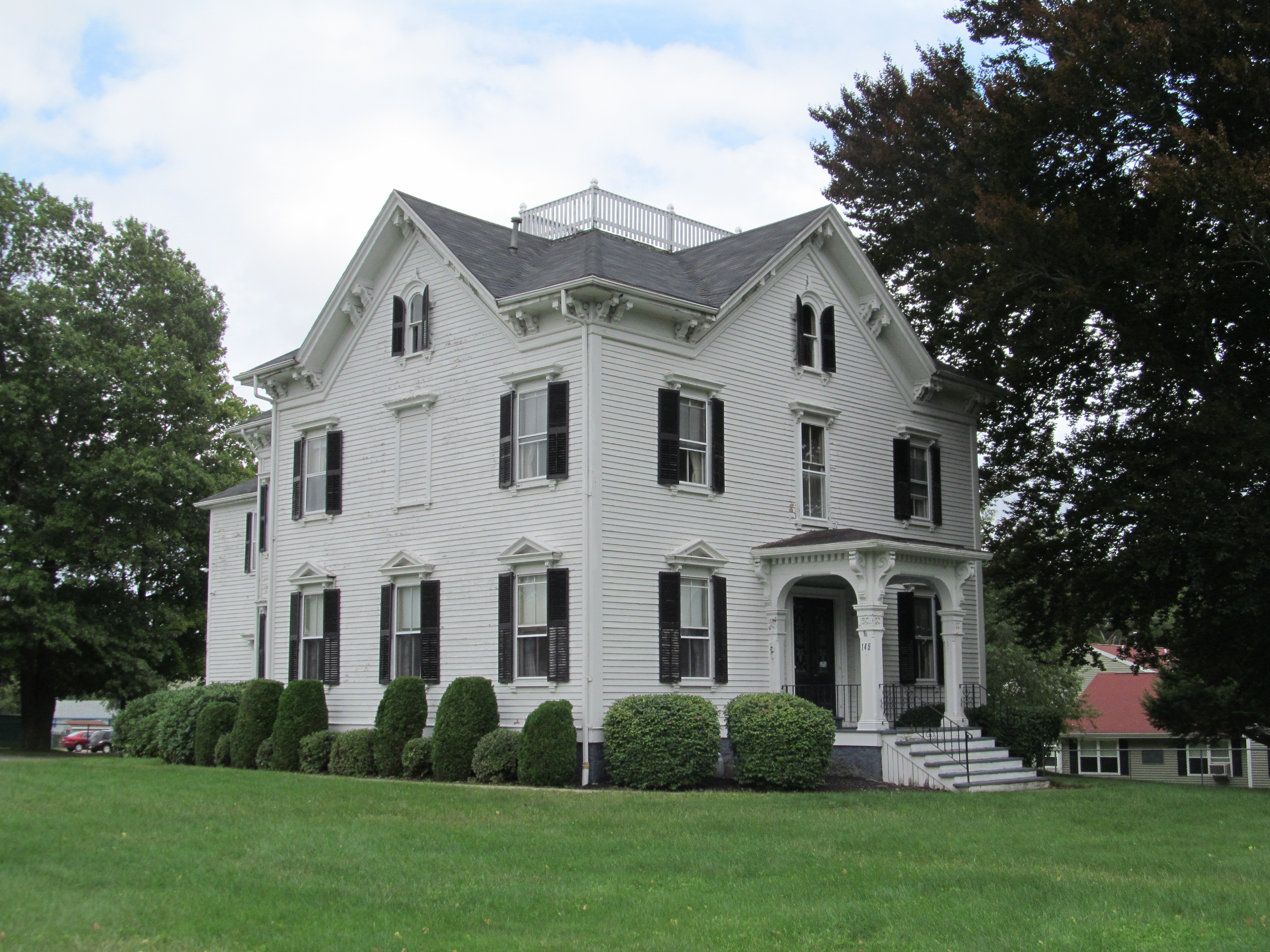
- Fuller-Dauphin Estate

- Location within Massachusetts Location within the United States
- Location: Taunton, Massachusetts
- Coordinates: 41°54′33″N 71°5′22″W
- Built: 1872
- Architect: Chandler, E.C.
- Architectural style: Italianate
- MPS: Taunton MRA
- NRHP reference No.: 84002118
- Added to NRHP: July 5, 1984

Fuller-Dauphin Estate, is a historic house and former estate known as "The Maples" located at 145 School Street in Taunton, Massachusetts.

It was built in 1872 for local Judge William Eddy Fuller and designed by local architect E.C. Chandler. It is a 2 1/2-story central hall plan Italianate style house with spacious proportions and disciplined ornament. The house later passed to Fuller's daughter who married Henry Dauphin. It remained in the Dauphin family until 1978.

It was added to the National Register of Historic Places in 1984. At the time, the property was one of the last large undivided estates in the city. However, the rear of the site has since been split off with an apartment complex added. The main house has been converted into offices.

== See also ==
- National Register of Historic Places listings in Taunton, Massachusetts
