= Joseph Fuller (musician) =

- Born: Joseph Owen Fuller; March 28, 1980 (age 45); Nacogdoches, Texas, U.S.
- Occupations: Concert pianist; recording artist; composer
- Years active: 2003–present
- Musical career
- Genres: Classical; crossover; gospel; new-age
- Website: josephfuller.com

Joseph Owen Fuller is American pianist and composer who has released 6 albums

== Career ==
Fuller was born on March 28, 1980, in Nacogdoches, Texas. He started playing the piano when he was 5 years old. He has a master's degree in piano from Baylor University. He has performed with conductors from the Houston Grand Opera, Metropolitan Opera, former Berkshire Opera, Indianapolis Opera and he has been a guest artist with the Indianapolis Children's Choir.

He held several solo concerts in Steinway Piano Galleries in the United States. Along with the Grammy foundation, Grammy in The Schools, he has made several appearances on network television, performed with the Fort Bend Symphony.

Fuller released his first studio album entitled, "Release…" in 2008. This album contains original arrangements of well-known hymns. "Abide With Me" is his second album, recorded in 2011. "It takes the listener through the music of a church service from preludes, hymns, anthems, and postludes." He recorded the album Christmastime in 2013. In 2019 he recorded the album Christmas In The city, and Forever Grateful...A Decade of Song in 2020.

His latest release, "Reflections of Tomorrow", contains ten compositions written by Fuller. Joseph Fuller has released his single "Somewhere" in 2023. This single was produced by GRAMMY Award-winning producer Brad Sayles.

== Discography ==
Albums

- Release... (2008)
- Abide With Me ( 2011)
- Christmastime (2013)
- Christmas In The city (2019)
- Forever Grateful...A Decade of Song (2020)
- Reflections of Tomorrow (2021)

Single

- When Almonds Blossomed (2019)
- Never Too Far (2021)
- Somewhere (from West Side Story) (2023)
- Deck The Halls (10th Anniversary) (2024)
