= George Selwyn Goldsbro' =

New Zealand architect

George Selwyn Goldsbro (born 1870) was a New Zealand architect based in Auckland. He trained under R. Mackay Fripp and later worked in Sydney and Melbourne before returning to New Zealand. Goldsbro served as honorary architect to the Anglican Diocese and designed ecclesiastical buildings and domestic architecture in the Auckland region. His practice has been associated with early Arts and Crafts influence in Auckland architecture and trained several later architects.

== Early life and background ==
Goldsbro was the son of Dr Charles Field Goldsbro, who emigrated to New Zealand in 1860 and served as a surgeon during the New Zealand Wars. Charles Goldsbro completed a medical degree at University of Sydney in 1868, the first student there to qualify for a MD, and returned to Auckland, where George Selwyn Goldsbro was born in 1870.

== Training and early career ==
Goldsbro studied under R. Mackay Fripp from 1884 to 1888. Fripp arrived in Auckland in 1881, opened an architectural office, and later became secretary of the Auckland Society of Arts, where he introduced architecture classes and competitions. In 1888 Fripp left for Canada and Goldsbro left for Australia.

In Australia, Goldsbro worked in Sydney and Melbourne, including employment with Sulman & Power, Howard Joseland, and Theo Kemnis.

== Auckland practice ==
In 1896 Fripp joined Goldsbro in partnership in Auckland; the partnership ended in 1898 when Fripp returned to Canada.

From 1902 to 1909 Goldsbro was in partnership with Henry Wade. In 1909 the firm designed the main building of Auckland Girls Grammar School.

During the First World War Goldsbro entered into partnership with E Holm Biss. In the 1920s the firm became Goldsbro and Carter.

== Works ==
=== Ecclesiastical and institutional ===
Goldsbro served as honorary architect to the Anglican Diocese and designed:

- Chapel of St Saviour's, Papatoetoe
- Presbyterian church, Uxbridge Road, Howick
- St Luke's, Russell Road, Manurewa
- St George's Parish Hall, Papatoetoe
- Orphans' Home, Papatoetoe
- Paterson wing at St John's College

=== Domestic ===
Goldsbro designed a number of houses, including:

- 66 Gillies Avenue (1905), his own house
- Bloomfield house, Gladstone Road (demolished 1999)
- Goldie house, St Georges Bay Road (demolished)
- Friend house, 33 Owens Road
- Coates house, Pencarrow Avenue
- Kidd house, 74 Gillies Avenue (1903)
- 11 Kimberley Road
- 23 Seaview Road
- 20 Ōrākei Road

== Influence and legacy ==
The firm has been described as the first architectural practice in Auckland with a strong Arts and Crafts influence to initiate the shingle and tile movement. The practice also trained several Auckland architects, including Gerald Jones and Frederick Browne.
