= Laughlin Constable =

- Type: Private
- Industry: Advertising
- Founded: 1976 (as Frankenberry, Laughlin, Bernstein & Constable)
- Headquarters: Chicago; Milwaukee
- Area served: Worldwide
- Key people: Steve Laughlin (Executive Chairman); Anthony Romano (CEO); Rome Seifert (CFO)
- Services: Marketing
- Revenue: $225 Million (Gross Billings)
- Number of employees: 120+
- Website: laughlin.com

Laughlin Constable is an advertising agency with offices in Chicago and Milwaukee.

== History ==
The agency was founded in 1976 in Milwaukee, and it entered the Chicago market in 1998 and New York in 2009. Founded as Frankenberry, Laughlin, Bernstein & Persa, changes in partnership led the agency to the name Laughlin Constable in 1992.

Laughlin Constable began as an advertising and added public relations services in 1978. It was named one of the nation's fastest-growing agencies by Adweek in 1993.

In 1998, Laughlin Constable purchased N.W. Ayer and opened an office in Chicago.

In 2005, it acquired the Chicago PR agency Grant/Jacoby. Then, in 2007, the agency acquired GreenHouse, a Chicago-based boutique agency. Soon after, the agency acquired Kohnke Hanneken, an agency that was profiled in Communication Arts.

In 2008, Laughlin Constable developed a strategic alliance with Mobium, a Chicago business-to-business agency that received much recognition, including Top Agency of 2006 by Crain Communications’ BtoB Magazine.

Then, in 2009, the agency's New York office was opened through the integration of Partners & Jeary.

In 2012, Laughlin Constable acquired the Milwaukee-based interactive marketing agency Fullhouse, as well as Milwaukee PR firm Zeppos & Associates. Laughlin Constable also expanded in March 2013 by acquiring New York and New Jersey agency, Filter Advertising.

== Notable work ==
In mid-2012, Laughlin Constable launched the No One Deserves to Die viral advertising campaign for the Lung Cancer Alliance. The goal of the campaign was to challenge the stigma associated with lung cancer: that people who have it, deserve it. The campaign proved extremely polarizing, sparking coverage in countless major news outlets across the country, including Time, Salon, Perez Hilton and Adweek. Media was placed in 31 markets across the country, from telephone booths and bus shelters to cinema spots and online ads.

In 2011–2012, Laughlin Constable created a television spot for the Wisconsin Department of Tourism with comedy director David Zucker. The commercial was filmed at the Riverside Theater and featured the Milwaukee Symphony Orchestra. Milwaukee-based Marcus Theatres also donated time to air a longer director's cut of the spot.

For Associated Bank, Laughlin Constable created a series of comedic television spots starring Green Bay Packers quarterback Aaron Rodgers. The integrated program promoted Associated Bank's Packers checking account.

Laughlin Constable was also responsible for the launch of Miller Sharps non-alcoholic beer, cited as the "best in category" campaign two years in a row by Adweek magazine.

== Workplace ==
Laughlin Constable has offices in two cities.

The Milwaukee office is located in the Mitchell Building in downtown Milwaukee, where the agency occupies five floors and the penthouse. The structure, built in the French Second Empire Style, was designed by Milwaukee architect Edward Townsend Mix and built in 1876. In 1973, the building was listed on the National Register of Historic Places. Only traces of the original interiors remain, but the exterior has been thoroughly preserved. The building, including the agency's space, was featured by Historic Milwaukee in 2011 in the inaugural Doors Open Milwaukee program.

The agency has been a member of the American Association of Advertising Agencies (4A's) since 1978, and Laughlin Constable staff members sit on several 4A's committees, including Digital Production, Agency Finance, Human Resource Management, New Business and Project Management.

The Chicago office is located on Michigan Avenue. The workplace was designed by Gary Lee Partners and was published in Interior Design magazine's Best in Office Design book. The space is wide-open, divided into courtyards of workstations and lounges. The office has been lauded for its tattoo-inspired floor, which depicts undersea motifs.

Laughlin Constable appeared on Ad Age’s Best Places to Work list in 2012. The agency received the Alfred P. Sloan Award for Business Excellence in Workplace Flexibility in both Chicago and Milwaukee, and it has been named one of the Top 100 Workplaces by the Milwaukee Journal Sentinel for several years.
