= Joseph Fuller (architect) =

American architect

Joseph F. Fuller Jr. AIA, NCARB (born 1960) is a New York area architect specializing in Educational Architecture and Historic Preservation. He is best known for his firm's designs for the 2009 Academy of Information Technology & Engineering in Stamford, CT, the 2010 restoration and expansion of Old Town Hall (Stamford, Connecticut), the expansion of Staples High School (Connecticut), and the restoration of the Gothic facades and campus of City College of New York.

== Career and company ==
Joseph F. Fuller Jr. received his Bachelor of Architecture Degree from the New York Institute of Technology. He is president and Managing Member of Fuller and D’Angelo, PC, Architects and Planners, the company founded by his late father Joseph F. Fuller Sr. AIA and Nicholas D’Angelo FARA, CSI in 1971 in Westchester, NY.

The Partners today are Fuller, Nicholas D’Angelo and his son, John D’Angelo, ARA, LEED AP. Said Zommorodian is the Firm's Chief Designer.

Fuller leads a staff of 24 including architects, draftspersons, 3D animators and technical staff. Their mission is to produce innovative, environmentally sound, high-quality architectural projects that provide long-lasting solutions to the world's ongoing design challenges. Green Building and Smart Buildings are among the concepts in the portfolio.

== Notable works ==
=== Academy of Information Technology & Engineering, Stamford ===
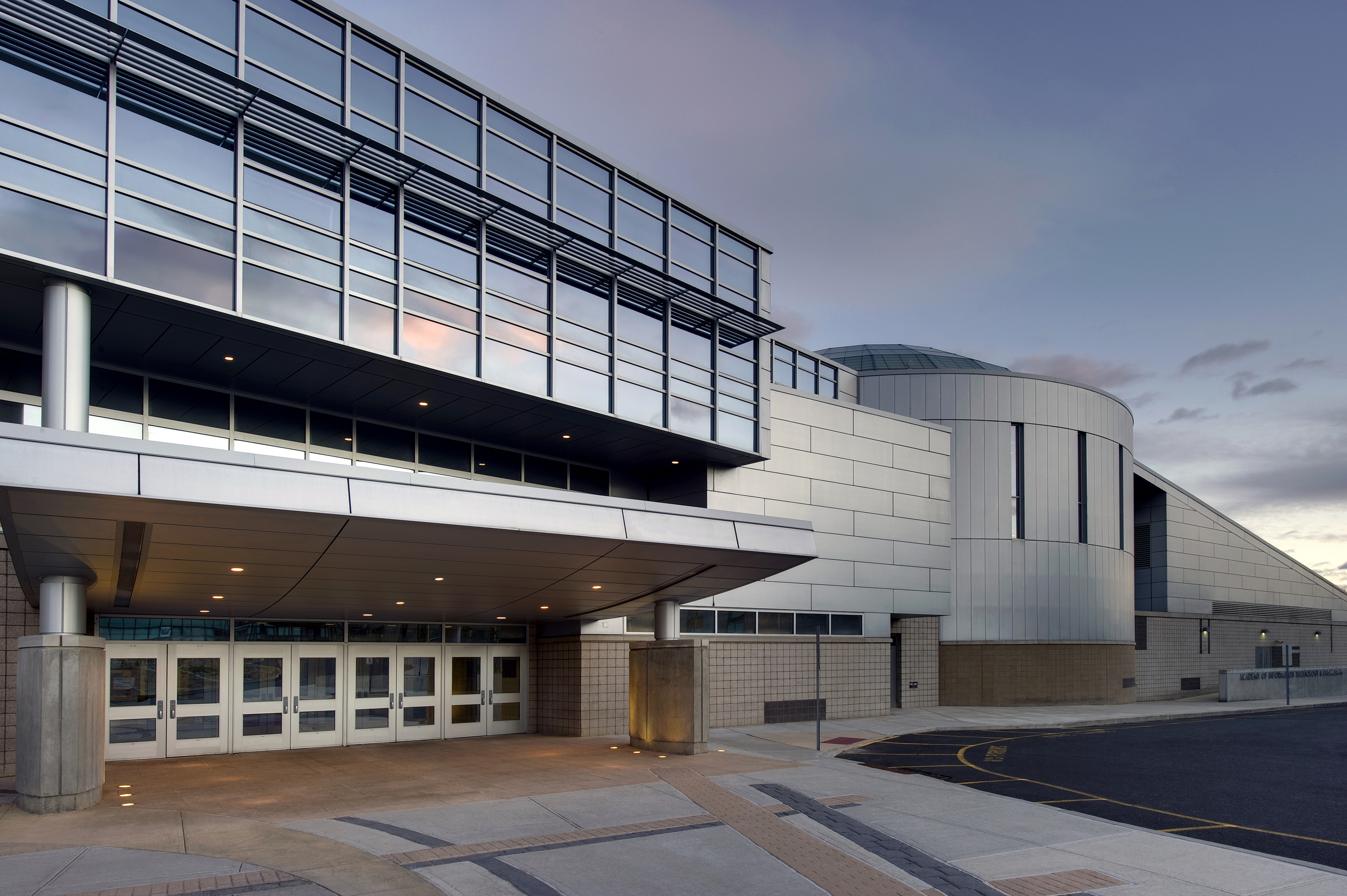
Information Technology & Engineering, Stamford, CT.

Fuller and D’Angelo's 2009 Academy of Information Technology & Engineering in Stamford, CT, has won awards both for design and education.

“The school's global approach to learning all stems from its architecture and technology," says Paul Gross, head of AITE, in the Stamford Times.

“This building is based on a Piazza," says Fuller & D'Angelo designer."It's a mix of transparency, natural light and dynamic space."

“Pupils are able to learn the basic fundamentals of construction by observing the immediate interior and exterior environment. The engineering aspects of various areas were conceived to have the structural, mechanical, electrical, and information technology components exposed to view. This assists in learning because the building is also their guide.“

=== Old Town Hall, Stamford ===
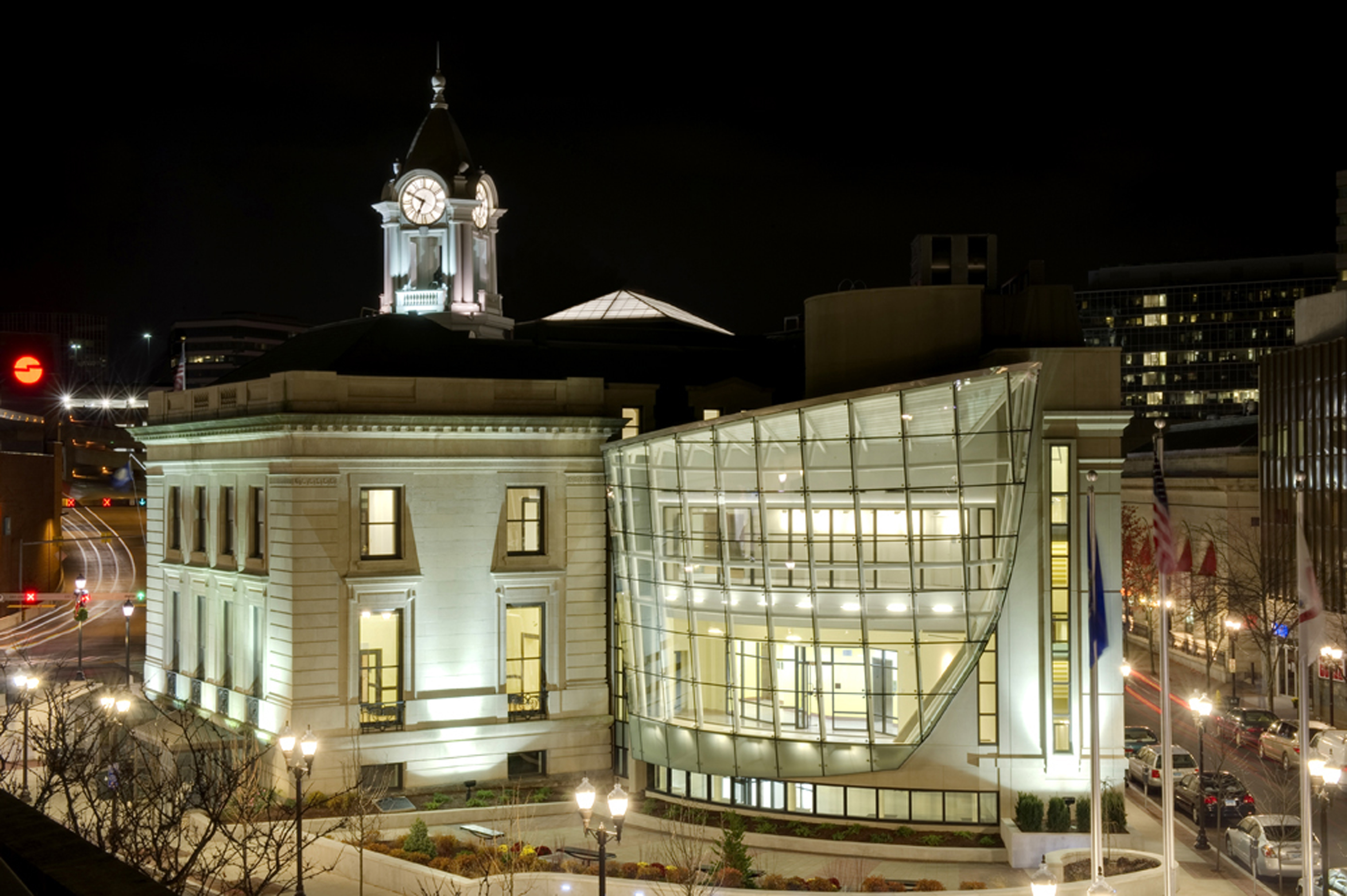
Exterior of Old Town Hall at night after expansion and renovation.

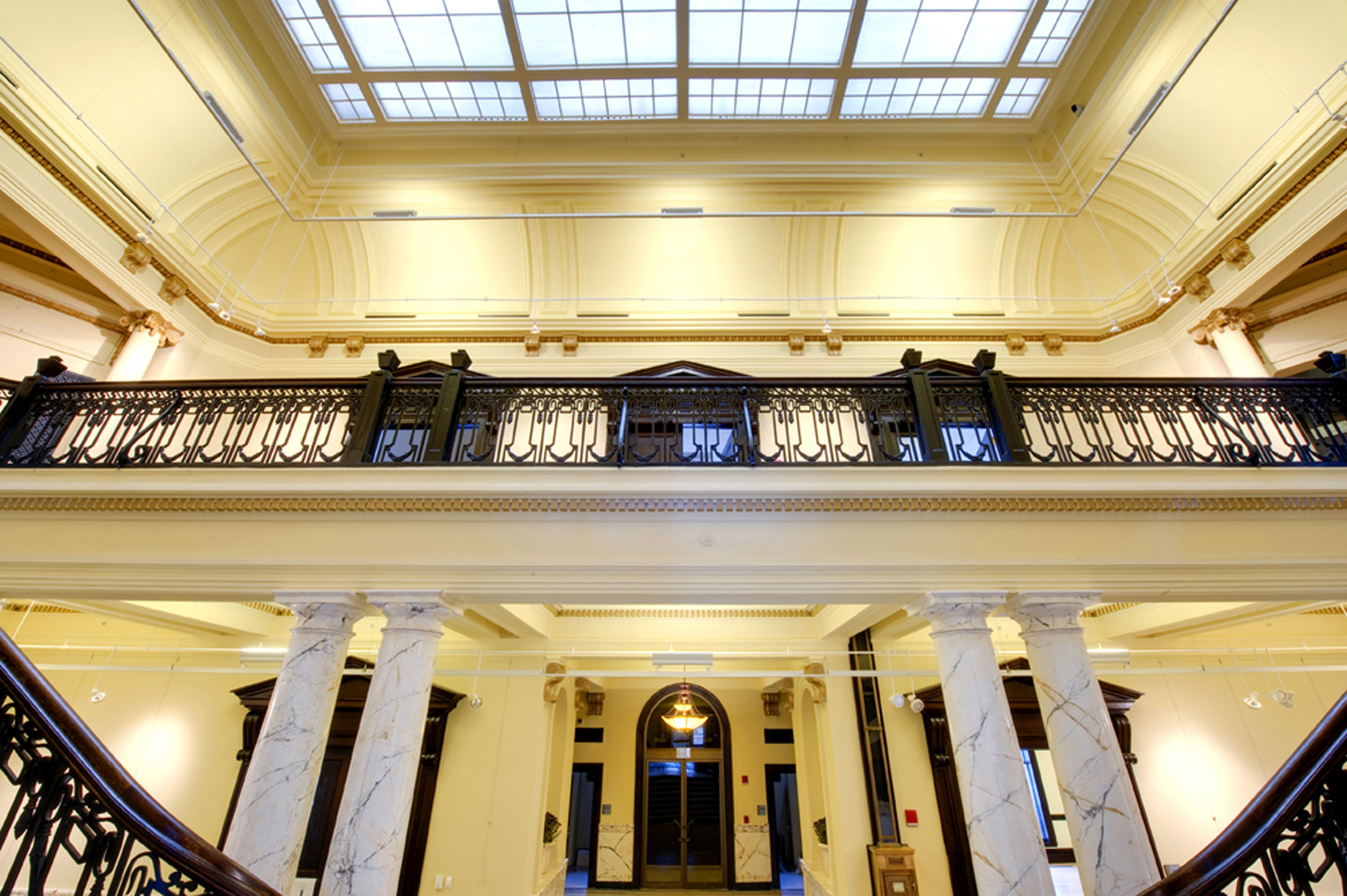
Interior after restoration, Old Town Hall, Stamford, CT.

Vacant for 20 years, the 1905 Old Town Hall (Stamford, Connecticut) was restored between 2008 and 2010, and a small addition added to allow for modern conveniences like elevators and air conditioning. Fuller and D’Angelo's historic preservation and restoration of the Beaux-Arts building was honored by the CT Trust for Historic Preservation.

The rehabilitated interiors bring the Beaux-Arts architecture and the original scagliola finishes back to life. The paint toppings were stripped and the original colors and scagliola revealed and restored.

=== Staples High School, Westport ===
Staples High School is known for high academic performance, being ranked #7 among CT High Schools by U.S. News & World Report.

Fuller and D’Angelo are responsible for the design of the building as it exists today, which was designed to accommodate 1,800 students. Due to an ever-increasing student enrollment and rapidly accelerating advances in science and technology, new space is required to include a robotics lab, space for 3-D printing, laser cutting, and new areas for synthetic biology.

Fuller and D’Angelo has presented studies of the further expansion with critical backup material to Superintendent of Schools Dr. Elliott Landon and the Westport Board of Education. Discussions are ongoing.

=== City College of New York ===
Fuller and D'Angelo have extensive experience in the area of historic restoration and vintage building renovation, including buildings that have received Landmark Designations.

Around the turn of the Twentieth Century, five Neo-Gothic buildings designed by architect George B. Post were built on the City College of New York (CCNY) campus, all featuring schist stone facades and terra cotta trims. These facades were “clad with the by-product of the City’s transit system, Manhattan schist, excavated during the construction of the IRT Broadway subway,”

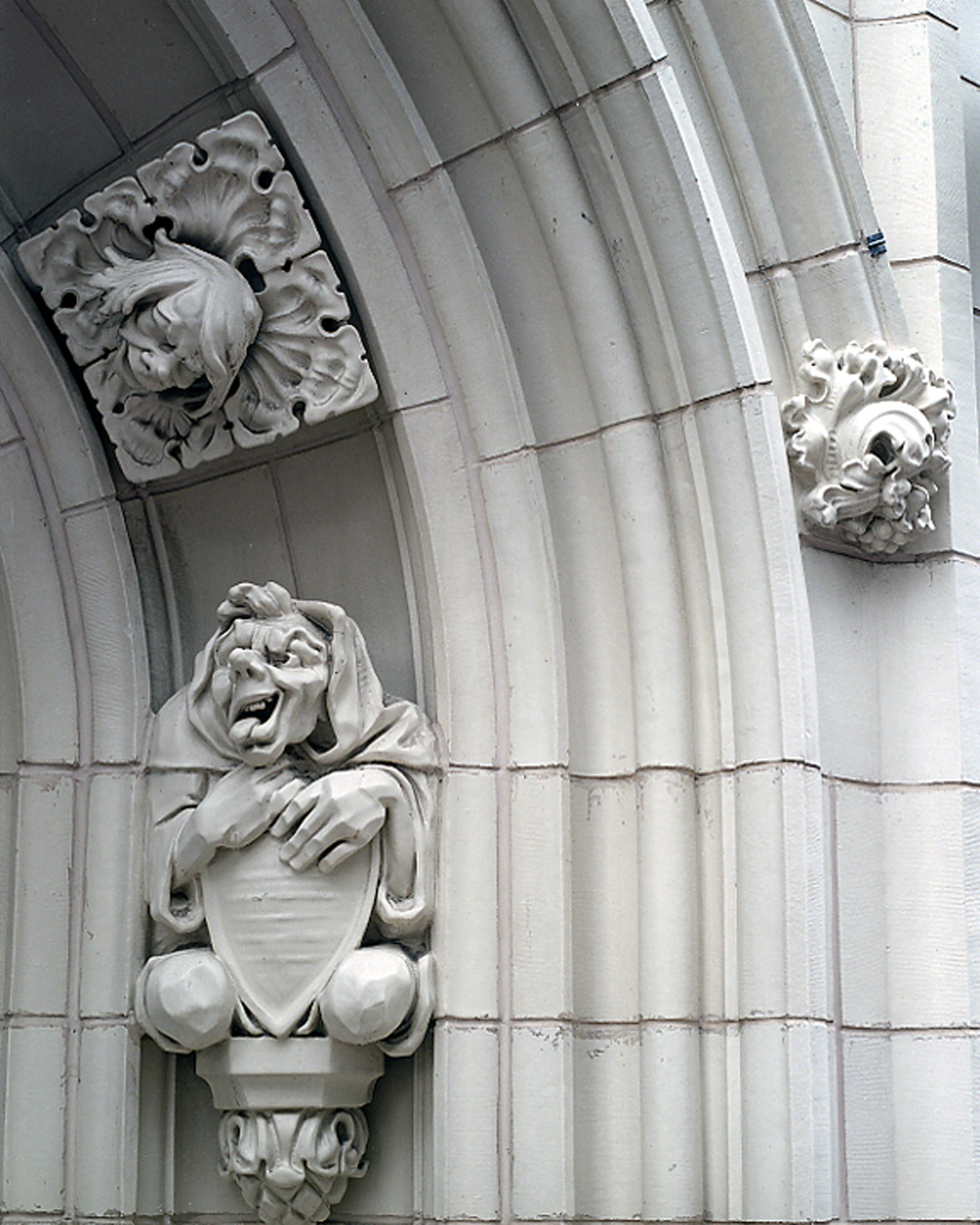
Detail of CCNY Gargoyles

A major project at the City College Campus was Fuller and D'Angelo's award-winning restoration of these buildings, which was noted in the New York Times.

The project was to completely restore and preserve the facades. The terra cotta was fully replaced and the schist stone was replaced where deteriorated and fully re-pointed. In addition, major structural flaws were discovered within the walls. The project was both Cosmetic and a difficult and intricate Structural Renovation.

== Awards ==
• Schooldesigner High Tech Silver Academy of Info by Fuller D’Angelo

• Schooldesigner Best Bronze Academy of Info by Fuller D’Angelo

• Edutopia 2008 DesignShare Awards for Best Scholastic Architecture, Academy of Information Technology and Engineering by Fuller D’Angelo 4/1/2009

• WAN Awards, World Architecture News Academy of Information Technology and Engineering by Fuller D’Angelo Feb 20, 2009

• CT Preservation Awards, CT Trust for Historic Preservation, Award of Merit, OLD TOWN HALL STAMFORD

• Society of American Registered Architects, Design Award of Special Recognition, Neo-Gothic Building Restoration of Townsend Harris Hall

== Personal background ==
Fuller joined the Vintage Sports Car Club of America (established in 1957) due to his interest for architectural historic preservation.

Fuller races a 1958 Morgan Plus 4 and a 1959 Lotus 7 Series 1 under the banner of ICE9RACING, named after Ice-Nine, Vonnegut's planet-killer. (See them at ICE9RACING.COM) He is also currently rebuilding a 1956 Austin Healey 100.
