= Fuller House (Barnstable, Massachusetts) =

Historic house in Massachusetts, United States

- U.S. National Register of Historic Places
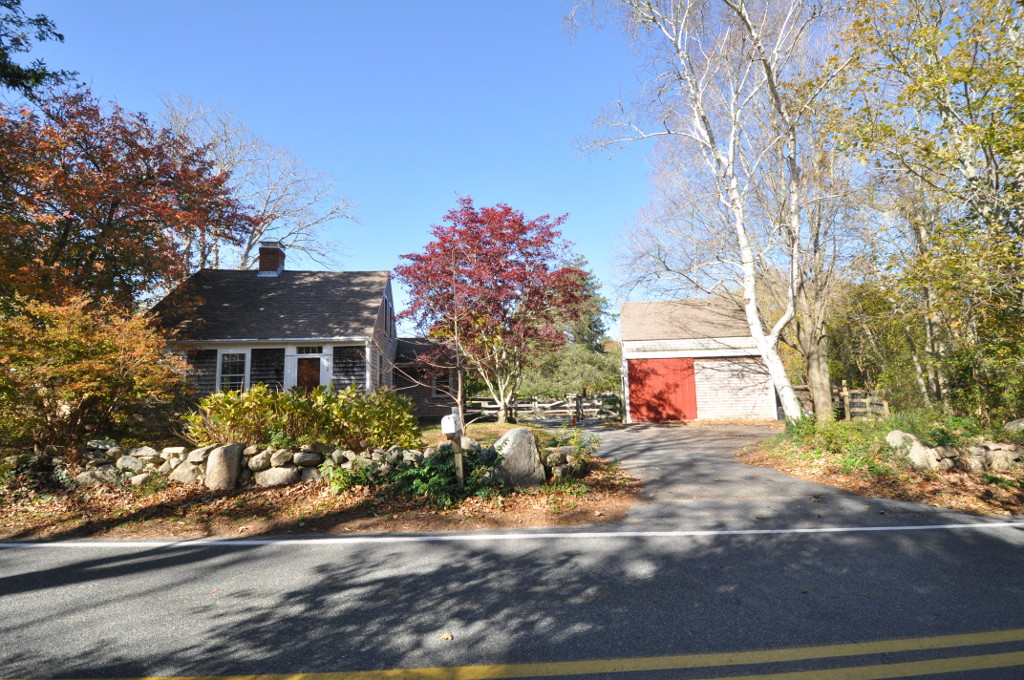

- Location within Cape Cod Location within Massachusetts Location within the United States
- Location: Parker Rd., Barnstable, Massachusetts
- Coordinates: 41°41′42″N 70°22′1″W
- Area: 1.2 acres (0.49 ha)
- Built: 1800
- Architectural style: Federal
- MPS: Barnstable MRA
- NRHP reference No.: 87000325
- Added to NRHP: March 13, 1987

The Fuller House is a historic house on Parker Road in Barnstable, Massachusetts. Built c. 1800, the house is a well-preserved local example of a Federal period farmhouse with barn. The house was listed on the National Register of Historic Places in 1987.

== Description and history ==
The Fuller House is set on the northwest side of Parker Road in West Barnstable, just northeast of its junction with Church Street, and is set near the road, behind a low fieldstone wall. Its main block is a 1 1/2-story wood-frame structure, three bays wide, with a side-gable roof and wood shingle siding. In a somewhat unusual arrangement for the period, the chimney is located centered behind the northernmost bay, while the main entrance, which is more typically in front of the chimney, is located in the southern bay. The entry is flanked by pilasters and topped by a transom window, typical Federal style features. The windows are six-over-six sash, with simple trim surrounds. There are two small extension ells, one to either side of the main block. The property includes an English barn of approximately the same age just northeast of the house.

Construction of the house is estimated to be about 1800 based on architectural analysis; the house is known to have been standing in 1836. The property was owned at this time by members of the Fuller family, who were engaged in a variety of agricultural pursuits. Parker Road was laid out in 1793 and widened in 1802.

== See also ==
- National Register of Historic Places listings in Barnstable County, Massachusetts
