= Fuller House (Minden, Louisiana) =

Historic house in Louisiana, United States

- U.S. National Register of Historic Places
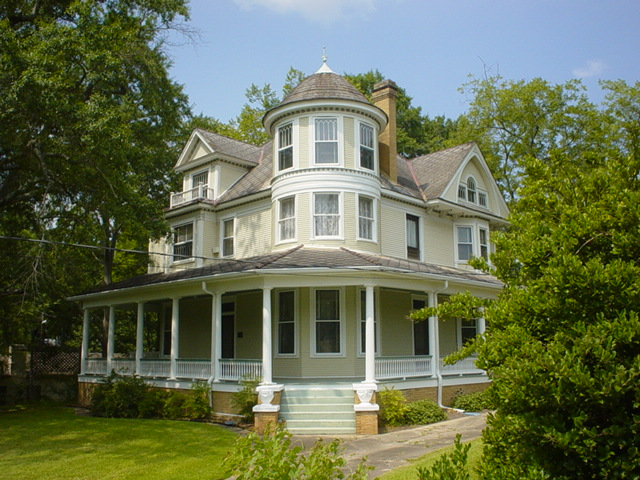

- Location within Louisiana Location within the United States
- Location: 220 W. Union, Minden, Louisiana
- Coordinates: 32°37′3″N 93°17′15″W
- Area: less than one acre
- Built: c.1905
- Architectural style: Queen Anne, Colonial Revival
- NRHP reference No.: 96000433
- Added to NRHP: April 18, 1996

The Fuller House, at 220 W. Union in Minden in Webster Parish, Louisiana, is a Queen Anne-style house which was built in about 1905. It was listed on the National Register of Historic Places in 1996. It has also been known as the Fuller-White House.

While Queen Anne houses of its era would often have Eastlake detailing, this house is unusual for having ornament which is almost all Colonial Revival in style. These elements include a Palladian window, the simple Tuscan columns on the house's wraparound gallery, and denticular molding under the eaves of the main block and on the turret and dormer.

It was deemed "locally significant as a superior example of the Queen Anne Revival style within the context of the several parish region of North Louisiana. It achieves this distinction because of its complex massing, culminating in a turret. The house is also important for its well-detailed and well-preserved interiors."
