= Mitchell and Watt =

New Zealand architect partnership

John Mitchell and Robert Martin Watt were a pair of New Zealand architects who designed numerous buildings, primarily educational buildings, several of which have been heritage listed.

Mitchell and Watt entered into a partnership in 1892 as architects for the Auckland Education Board (Note: The Auckland Education Board's boundaries are equivalent to the former Auckland Province and not the modern Auckland region or urban area.) until at least 1905.

== John Mitchell ==
John Mitchell (c.1859–1947) was born in Ramelton, Ireland, he trained as an architect in Ireland before heading to New Zealand in 1888. He was an early adopter of reinforced concrete and developed a baked earthenware block. In 1912 he went to England before returning to New Zealand a decade later. Mitchell spent the later years of his life in Rotorua, where he would die in 1947.

== Robert Martin Watt ==
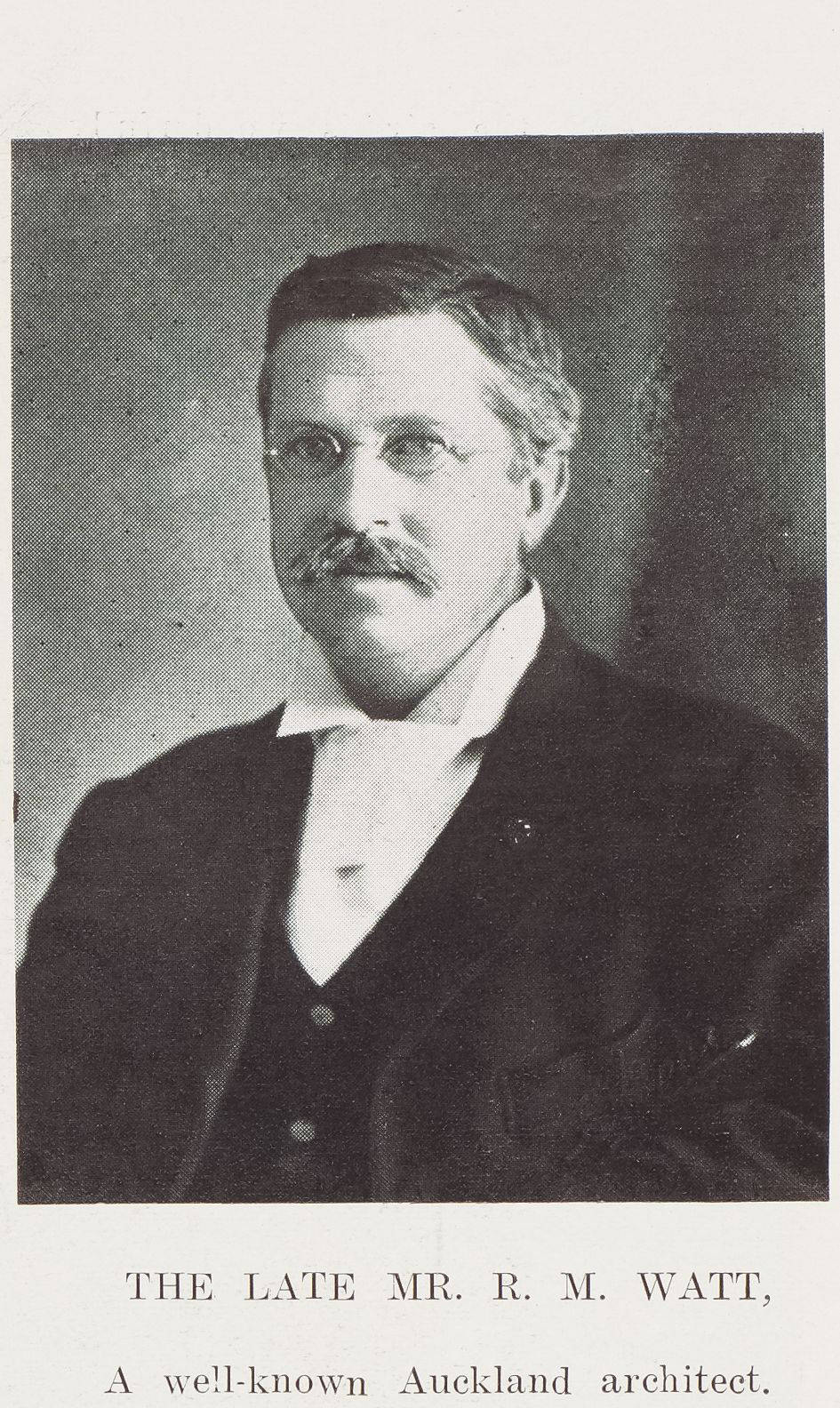
Robert Martin Watt

Robert Martin Watt (1860–1907) was born in Shotts, Lanarkshire, Scotland. Watt studied architecture in Glasgow under H & D Barclay before immigrating to New Zealand c.1878. Watt was a member of St Stephen's, Ponsonby, for which he designed an extension.

In 1906 Watt was elected as president of the Auckland branch of the New Zealand Institute of Architects Watt lived in a home he named Glencairn in Bayfield, Ponsonby. He died in April, 1907. Before his death he was appointed to judge designs of the Auckland Town Hall.

== Mitchell and Watt ==
The two architects formed a partnership in 1892, previously they worked independently in Auckland. Later that year they were appointed to the Auckland Education Board. Mitchell and Watt designed multiple school buildings in the Auckland Province area. The pair also designed numerous residential, commercial, and religious buildings. Their partnership ended either c.1905 or 1907. (Note: Watt's obituary states his partnership ended two or three years before his death. Modern sources state the partnership lasted until 1907. Watt's known work after 1905 was independent of Mitchell and Mitchell has no recorded work after 1905 until after Watt's death.)

Mitchell was responsible for new works whilst Watt was responsible for existing works and extensions. The pair designed numerous school buildings across the Auckland Province area

In December, 1902, the pair received notice from the Board of Education that their employment was to be terminated in three months. The pair were given a hearing to justify the dismissal, where the board charged them with incurring excessive costs and delays, but public support for the architects resulted in the board members being voted out at the election with those who supported Mitchell and Watt being elected with a strong majority. The Auckland Star described the charges as 'utterly insignificant'.

The pair were likely inspired by Edward Robert Robson in their design of school buildings. Robson favoured the Queen Anne style as he believed Gothic architecture's association with religion was inappropriate for secular educational buildings. Education in New Zealand was secular and many of Mitchell and Watt's designs are influenced by the Queen Anne style, notable examples include Bayfield School and Onehunga Primary School.

Schools designed by Mitchell and Watt are 'held to represent an important phase in the architectural development of school buildings in New Zealand'.

Mitchell and Watt had innovative design techniques relating to ventilation, lighting, and heating. Examples include ventilation holes in the eaves, a patented stove, and large windows.

== List of buildings ==
Name	Date	Image	Note	Ref
Winstone Stables	1883		Only designed by Watt. Registered as a Category 1 building with Heritage New Zealand	
Newton Council Chambers and Fire Station	1887–1889		Only designed by Mitchell. Registered as a Category 2 building with Heritage New Zealand	
Kuaotunu School House	1892		Registered as a Category 2 building with Heritage New Zealand	
Hukanui School	1893		Designed by either Mitchell alone or both Mitchell and Watt (Note: One source attributes the building to Mitchell and another source attributes it to both Mitchell and Watt) Registered as a Category 2 building with Heritage New Zealand	
Greenhithe school building	1893		Registered as a Category B building with Auckland Council	
Te Awamutu School	1894		Designed an extension for the school. Registered as a Category 2 building with Heritage New Zealand	
Winstone shops on Symonds Street	1895			
Bayfield School	1896 and 1904		Registered as a Category I building with Heritage New Zealand	
St James Church, Pukekohe	1898		Possibly designed by Watt alone but may also have been work of both men. (Note: One source credits both men for St James but another states only Watt was involved.) Building was relocated, current status is unknown presumed demolished	
Church of Christ, Newton	1898		Demolished for the Auckland motorway	
Epsom property	c.1898			
St Paul's Church, Buckland	1898–1900		Registered as a Category B building with Auckland Council	
St Peter's Presbyterian Church, Grey Lynn	1899		Only extensions and redesign of existing Church. Demolished c.1950	
Methodist Church in Te Aroha	1900		Later became a Baptist Church and later became a private residence.	
Mt Eden Congregational Church	1900		Registered as a Category B building with Auckland Council	
Cambridge Primary School	1900		Designed an extension block	
Riverhead school	1900			
Onehunga Primary School	1901		Registered as a Category 1 building with Heritage New Zealand	
Richmond Road Manual Training School	1903		Scheduled as a Category B building with Auckland Council	
Newton East Manual Training School	c.1903		Demolished in 1959. Designed identically to Newmarket and Richmond Road Manual Training Schools	
Newmarket Manual Training School	1903		Registered as a Category B building with Auckland Council	
Australis House/Entrican Building	1903–1904		Registered as a Category I building with Heritage New Zealand	
St Andrew's, Howick	1903–1904		Registered as a Category 2 building with Heritage New Zealand	
Taniwha School	1904–1905		Registered as a Category 2 building with Heritage New Zealand	
Dargaville school	1905		Designed an addition for the school	
Te Mata school	1905		Registered as a Category B building with Waikato District Council	
Maungatautari school	1905		Registered as a Category B building with the Waipa District Council. Closed in 2011	
Leys Institute	1905–1906		Only Watt was involved with the Leys Institute. Registered as a Category I building with Heritage New Zealand	
St Stephen's, Ponsonby	1906–1907		Only Watt was involved. This was just an extension to an existing Church building. Registered as a Category 2 building with Heritage New Zealand.	
Karangahake School	1907		Addition designed by Mitchell. Registered as a Category I building with Heritage New Zealand	
Seddon Memorial Technical College	1909		Only designed by Mitchell. Registered as a Category 2 building with Heritage New Zealand	
Papakura School	1913		An extension which is now the main building was built in 1913 to a design from Mitchell and Watt. Registered as a category B building with Auckland Council	
Helensville Manual Training School	1912		Likely the work of Mitchell and Watt but not confirmed	
Cambridge Manual Training School	c.1903		Likely the work of Mitchell and Watt but not confirmed. Demolished.	
Ponsonby Fire Station	1902		Attributed to Watt by John Stacpoole but other authors attribute it to someone else. Registered as a Category B building with Auckland Council	
