= Joseph Fuller House =

Historic house in Massachusetts, United States

- U.S. National Register of Historic Places
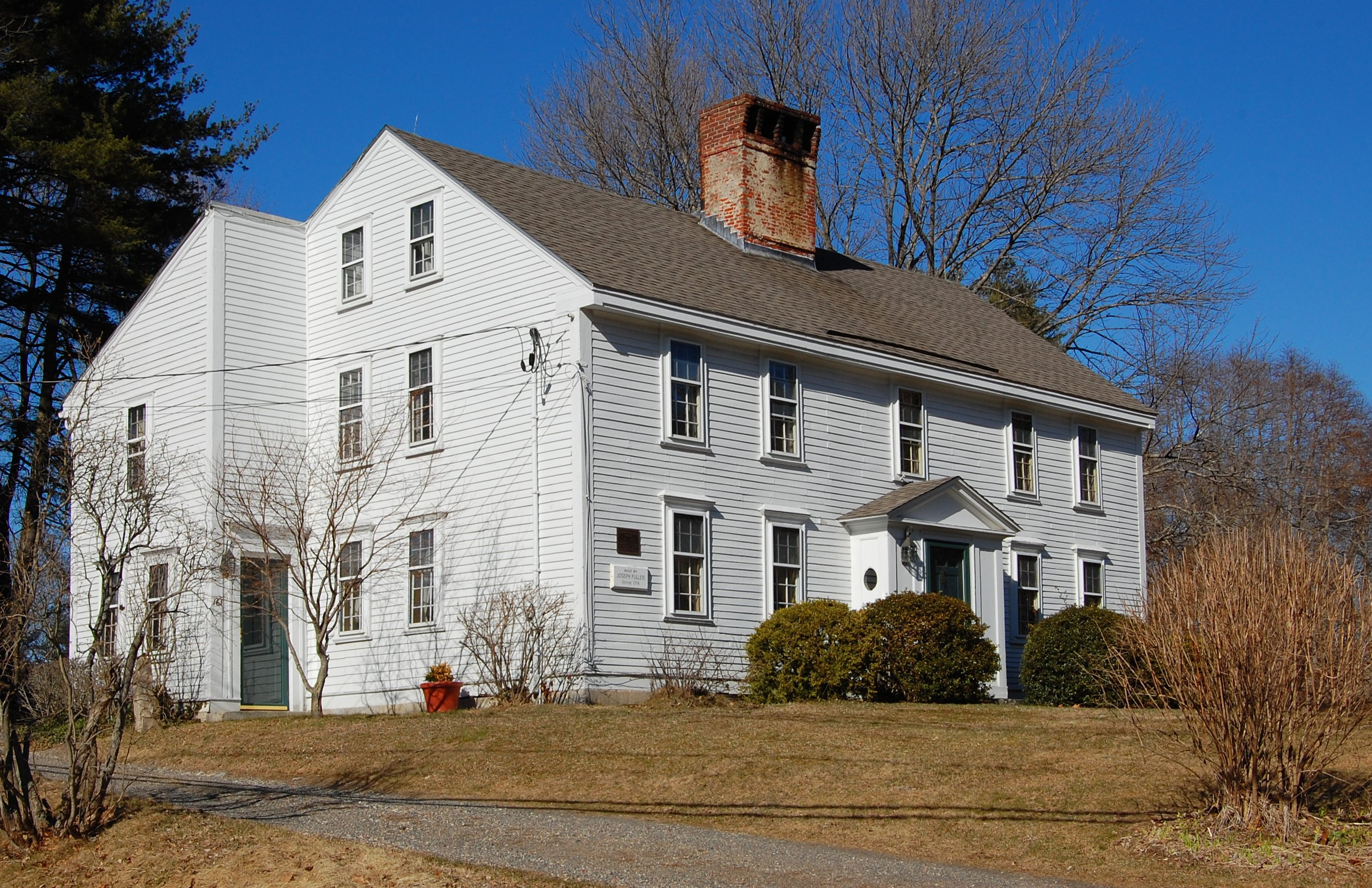

- Location within Massachusetts Location within the United States
- Location: 161 Essex Street, Middleton, Massachusetts
- Coordinates: 42°37′3″N 71°2′11″W
- Built: 1714
- Architectural style: Colonial
- MPS: First Period Buildings of Eastern Massachusetts TR
- NRHP reference No.: 90000244
- Added to NRHP: March 9, 1990

The Joseph Fuller House is a historic late First Period house located in Middleton, Massachusetts.

== Description and history ==
The oldest part of the house was built sometime before 1720 by Joseph Fuller, and consisted of two stories, each containing two rooms, with a central chimney. Later in the 18th century a leanto section was added, giving the house a saltbox appearance. This addition included a "Beverly jog", an extension of the leanto to the left side providing shelter for an entrance there. In about 1800, a gabled front entry was added to the symmetrical front facade. Most of the interior decoration also dates to about 1800.

The house was listed on the National Register of Historic Places on March 9, 1990.

== See also ==
- National Register of Historic Places listings in Essex County, Massachusetts
