= W. Joseph Fuller House =

Historic house in Iowa, United States

- U.S. National Register of Historic Places
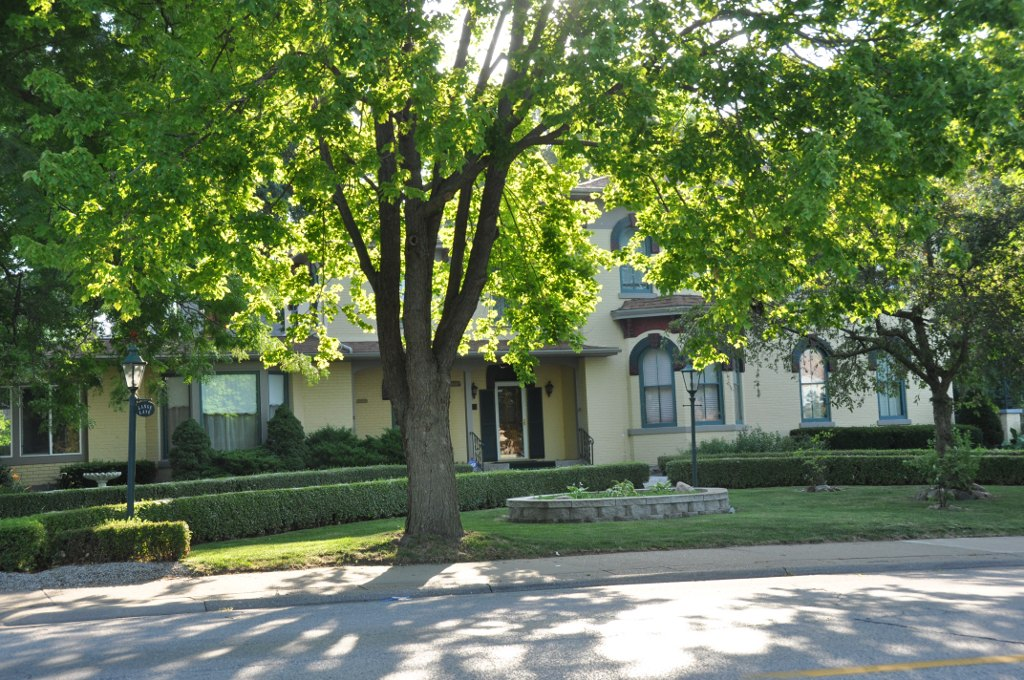

- Location within Iowa Location within the United States
- Location: 1001 Mulberry Ave. Muscatine, Iowa
- Coordinates: 41°25′49″N 91°02′52″W
- Area: less than one acre
- Built: 1878
- Architectural style: Vernacular Italianate
- NRHP reference No.: 82000416
- Added to NRHP: December 10, 1982

W. Joseph Fuller House is a historic residence located in Muscatine, Iowa, United States. It has been listed on the National Register of Historic Places since 1982.

== History ==
Four Fuller brothers, German immigrants, were already living in Muscatine in 1837. One of them, Henry, was a brick maker. He had six children and his sons Joseph and Anthony followed him in the brick making business. Joseph bought this lot in 1877 and had the house built the following year. He lived here until at least 1892. City directories from the late 19th-century also list this as the location of his pottery manufacturing business.

== Architecture ==
The house is a vernacular interpretation of the Italianate style. While it is similar in size and age with other houses in the neighborhood, its brick exterior distinguishes it from the frame houses that surround it. The exterior is a soft brick that is painted. The structure is a hipped roof box, and features large round-arched windows. The round arches are composed of brick with stone keystones. Large brackets with pendants band the cornice at the roof line of the two-story structure.
