= Waiuku =

- town
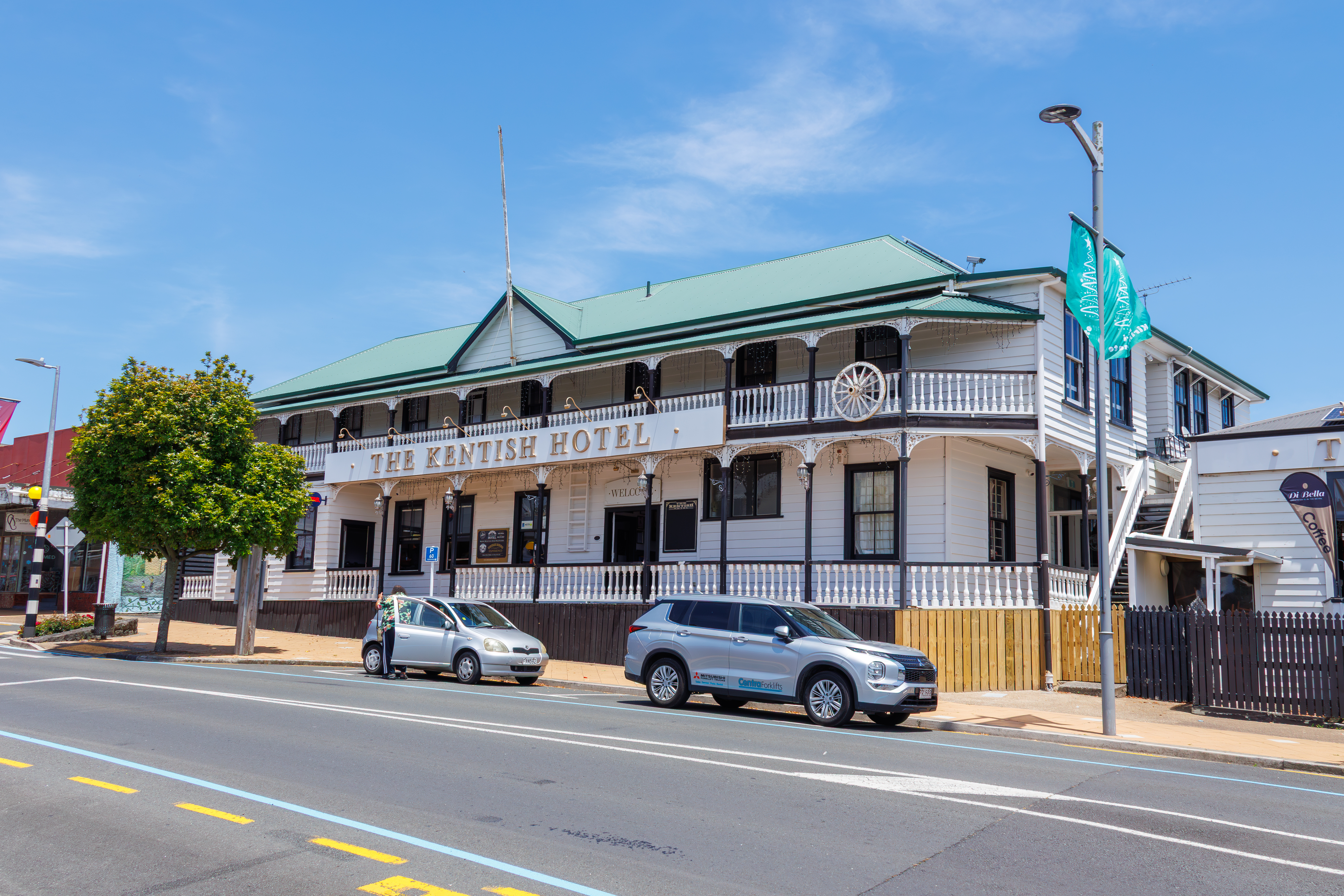
- The Kentish Hotel on Queen Street
- Interactive map of Waiuku
- Coordinates: 37.249°S 174.730°E
- Country: New Zealand
- Region: Auckland Region
- Ward: Franklin ward
- Board: Franklin Local Board
- Electorates: Port Waikato; Hauraki-Waikato (Māori)

Government
  - Territorial authority: Auckland Council
  - Mayor of Auckland: Wayne Brown
  - Port Waikato MP: Matthew Paul
  - Hauraki-Waikato MP: Hana-Rawhiti Maipi-Clarke

Area
  - Total: 7.87 km^{2} (3.04 sq mi)

Population (June 2025)
  - Total: 9,860
  - Density: 1,250/km^{2} (3,240/sq mi)
- Postcode(s): 2123

Waiuku is a rural town in the Auckland Region of New Zealand. It is located at the southern end of the Waiuku River, which is an estuarial arm of the Manukau Harbour, and lies on the isthmus of the Āwhitu Peninsula, which extends to the northeast. It is 40 kilometres southwest of Auckland city centre, and 12 kilometres north of the mouth of the Waikato River.

Settled in the 13th or 14th centuries, the Waiuku area was an important transportation hub, as the Te Pai o Kaiwaka portage was the preferred route for people travelling between the Waikato River and Manukau Harbour. The area became a centre for Ngāti Kahukōkā, a Waiohua hapū, by the 15th century. Ngāti Te Ata developed as a union between Waiohua and Waikato Tainui peoples, around the 17th century at Waiuku.

Waiuku became a trading port in 1851, facilitating trade between the Waikato River and the port of Onehunga, and Purapura, a Ngāti Te Ata village was established at the navigable head of the Awaroa Creek to the south. After the Invasion of the Waikato in 1863, the port of Waiuku suffered due to the lack of Māori produce being transported. By the end of the 19th century, Waiuku had begun developing into a centre for the dairy industry. In 1922, a railway line branch was constructed to Waiuku, and by 1955 Waiuku had grown enough to become an independent borough. In 1968, the Glenbrook steel mill opened in neighbouring Glenbrook, becoming a major employer in Waiuku.

== Etymology ==
The name Waiuku is a Māori name meaning "Waters of Uku"; uku being a type of clay used as a soap. The name recalls the story of a Ngāti Kahukōkā woman of high rank who was choosing between two suitors, Tamakau and Tamakae. Tamakae, having been working in the kūmara gardens, was taken to the river by the elders of the area to be washed using uku from the shores of the Waiuku River, before meeting his potential new wife. The location where Tamakae was washed was the western banks of the Waiuku River, directly behind where the Waiuku Museum stands today.

== Geography ==
Waiuku is located at the southern end of the Waiuku River, an estuarial arm of the Manukau Harbour. It is close to the town of Pukekohe to the east, and is directly north of the Waikato River mouth. Prior to European settlement, the Waiuku area was primarily a dense kahikatea-dominated forest, with swamps areas near waterways. Since then, the majority of swamps have been drained.

=== Climate ===
Climate data for Waiuku Forest (10km S of Waiuku, 1981–2010 normals, extremes 1939–1995)
Month	Jan	Feb	Mar	Apr	May	Jun	Jul	Aug	Sep	Oct	Nov	Dec	Year
Record high °C (°F)	33.0 (91.4)	29.5 (85.1)	30.0 (86.0)	27.0 (80.6)	24.7 (76.5)	20.6 (69.1)	20.1 (68.2)	21.1 (70.0)	21.9 (71.4)	25.1 (77.2)	26.0 (78.8)	27.7 (81.9)	33.0 (91.4)
Mean daily maximum °C (°F)	22.9 (73.2)	23.5 (74.3)	22.3 (72.1)	20.0 (68.0)	17.7 (63.9)	15.1 (59.2)	14.4 (57.9)	14.9 (58.8)	16.4 (61.5)	17.3 (63.1)	19.1 (66.4)	21.2 (70.2)	18.7 (65.7)
Daily mean °C (°F)	18.7 (65.7)	19.2 (66.6)	17.9 (64.2)	15.5 (59.9)	13.5 (56.3)	10.9 (51.6)	10.0 (50.0)	10.9 (51.6)	12.4 (54.3)	13.6 (56.5)	15.2 (59.4)	17.3 (63.1)	14.6 (58.3)
Mean daily minimum °C (°F)	14.5 (58.1)	14.9 (58.8)	13.5 (56.3)	11.0 (51.8)	9.3 (48.7)	6.7 (44.1)	5.7 (42.3)	7.0 (44.6)	8.5 (47.3)	10.0 (50.0)	11.4 (52.5)	13.4 (56.1)	10.5 (50.9)
Record low °C (°F)	4.9 (40.8)	5.8 (42.4)	2.1 (35.8)	−0.3 (31.5)	−1.1 (30.0)	−2.4 (27.7)	−3.8 (25.2)	−2.7 (27.1)	−0.3 (31.5)	0.4 (32.7)	1.2 (34.2)	3.4 (38.1)	−3.8 (25.2)
Average rainfall mm (inches)	73.6 (2.90)	89.9 (3.54)	86.2 (3.39)	83.2 (3.28)	90.9 (3.58)	156.2 (6.15)	156.8 (6.17)	163.4 (6.43)	144.6 (5.69)	112.8 (4.44)	94.4 (3.72)	64.9 (2.56)	1,316.9 (51.85)
Source: NIWA (rainfall 1991–2020)

== History ==
=== Māori history ===
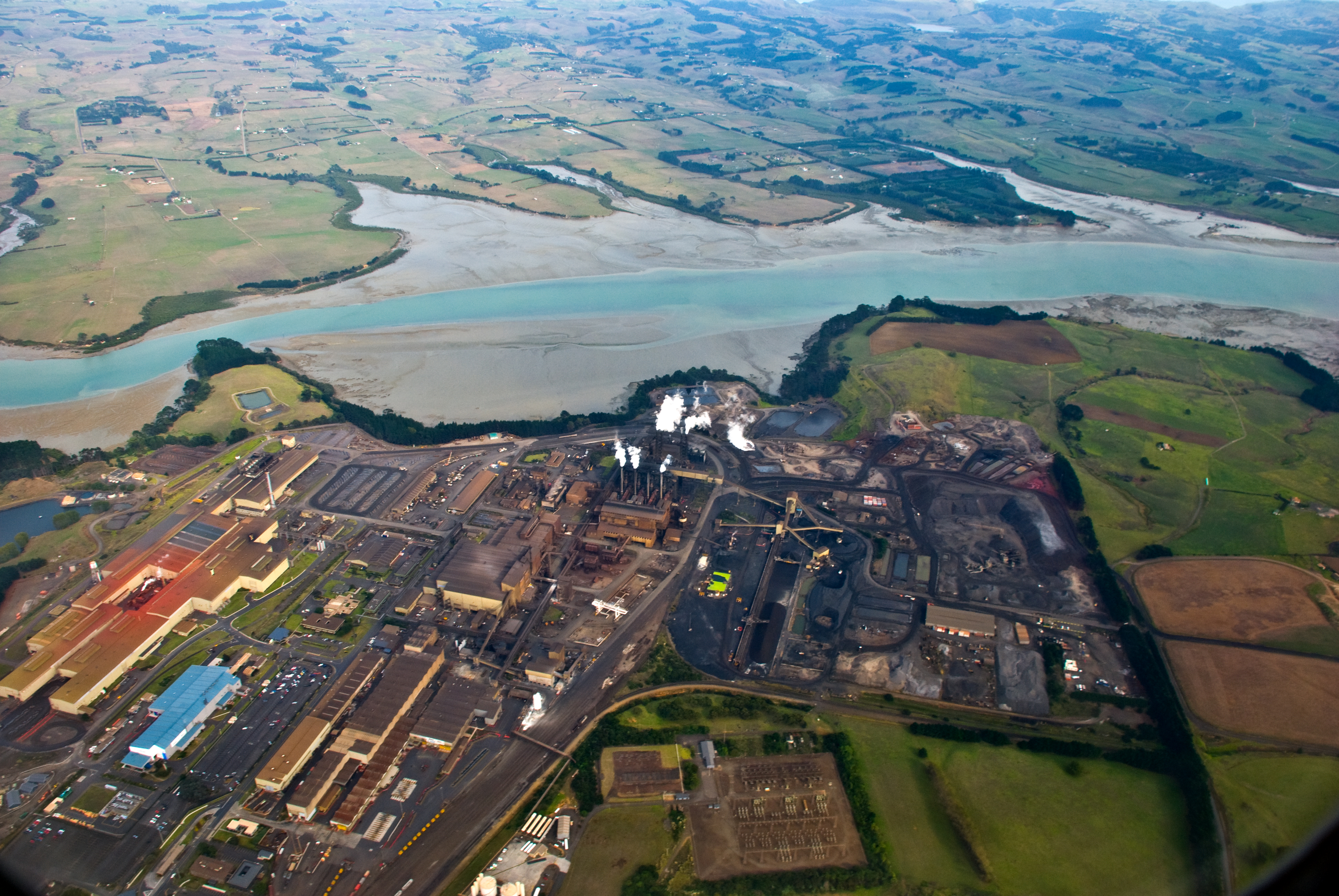
The Waiuku River, an estuarial arm of the Manukau Harbour has traditionally been an important transportation link and source of food for Tāmaki Māori

The Manukau Harbour has been settled by Tāmaki Māori since around the 13th or 14th centuries. Tāmaki Māori of the southern Manukau Harbour traditionally used the food resources of the harbour, collecting shellfish such as cockles, sea urchins and kōura, and fished species including snapper, kahawai and parore.

The Waiuku area was an important due to Te Pai o Kaiwaka, a portage which was the main route for transport between the Waikato River and the Manukau Harbour. The route followed the Awaroa Stream to the northernmost navigable point, after which waka were hauled overland to the Waiuku River. The portage was the preferred route, due to the unpredictable seas of the west coast. The existence of the portage meant that the Waiuku area has historically been difficult to settle during times of war.

The Waiohua hapū Ngāti Kahukōkā began occupying the southern Manukau Harbour and Waikato River mouth around the 15th century. Ngāti Kahukōkā's main centres were Puketapu on the Āwhitu Peninsula, Tītī, near modern-day Mauku.

In the 17th century, Ngāti Kahukōkā were led by Te Ata-i-Rehia, granddaughter of Huakaiwaka, the eponymous ancestor of the Waiohua, a major confederation of iwi of the Tāmaki isthmus and South Auckland areas. Te Ata-i-Rehia was gifted land after Ngāti Kahukōkā were helped in conflicts by Waiohua. The iwi were also known by the name Te Ruakaiwhare, referencing the taniwha guardian of the Manukau Harbour, Kaiwhare, who looked over the tribe.Then took name from Te Ata I Rehia. Continuing to face invasions from neighbouring tribes, Te Ata-i-Rehia married the Ngāti Mahuta chief Tapaue. A new tribal identity grew from the union between Waiohua and Waikato Tainui. Upon her death, the iwi took the name Ngāti Te Ata, making Te Ata-i-Rehia the eponymous ancestor of the iwi. After the death of Tapaue, the couples' son Pāpaka secured Waiuku for Ngāti Te Ata. By 1700, Te Awaroa / Te Pae o Kaiwaka Pā had been established as a defensive fortification on the eastern banks of the Awaroa Creek, surrounded by a forested swamp. Ngāti Tamaoho, an iwi closely related to Ngāti Te Ata, began to have a presence on the Āwhitu Peninsula and southern Manukau Harbour by the 18th century.

==== Musket Wars ====
By the early 19th century, the southwestern Manukau Harbour and Waikato River mouth was a densely settled area, where interrelated hapū, Ngāti Te Ata, Ngāti Tamaoho, Ngāti Tiipa and Ngāti Pou, had established kāinga. In March 1822, a Ngāpuhi taua (war party) led by Hongi Hika attacked the Āwhitu Peninsula settlements. While Ngāti Te Ata successfully repelled the attackers at Waiuku, most members of Ngāti Te Ata fled the area for safety, with only a small number remaining for ahi kā (visible occupation land rights). In 1823 during the war, Hongi Hika hauled his waka over the portage at Waiuku, to reach the Waikato River. The area remained depopulated until the mid-1830s. As a result of the Musket Wars, the Waiohua and Waikato hapū of the southern Manukau developed closer ties.

=== Early colonial era ===
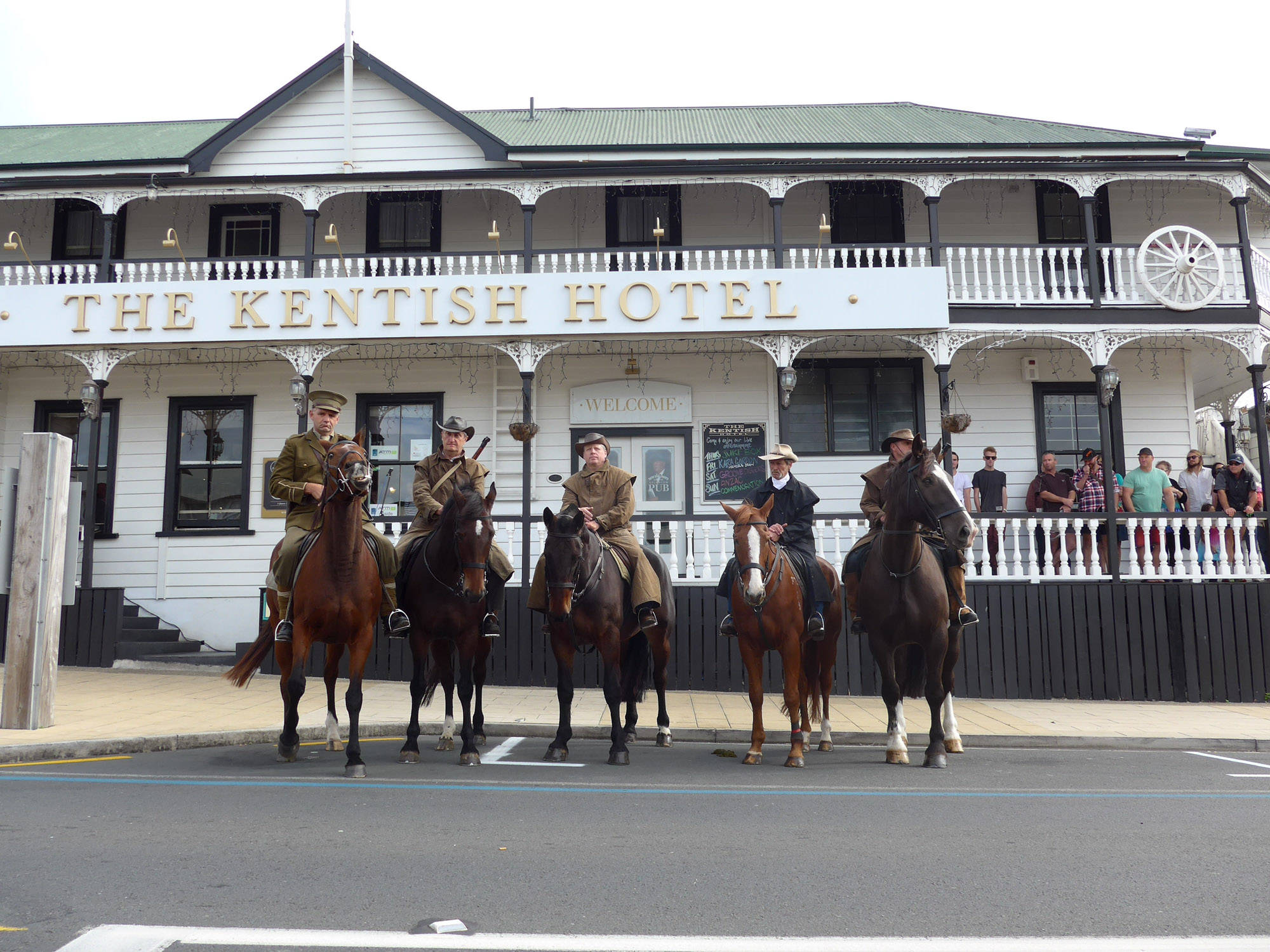
The Kentish Hotel is one of the earliest buildings established in Waiuku, built in 1851 or early 1852

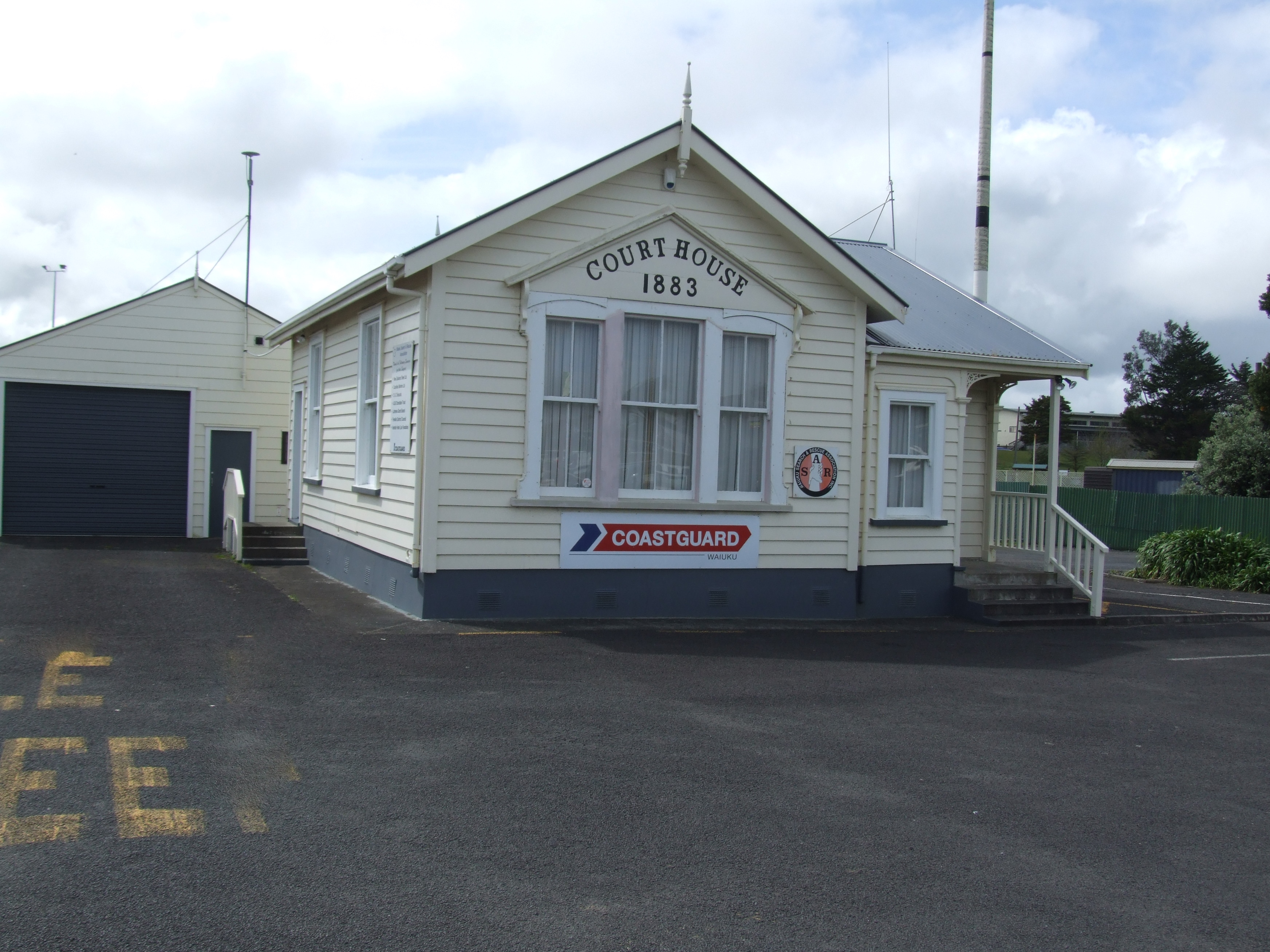
1883 Old Waiuku Court House

The first Europeans to live in the area arrived in September 1836, when Robert Maunsell chose Moeatoa as the location of the first Manukau Harbour Christian Missionary Society station. The Maunsells moved to Port Waikato in the following year, where they established the Te Kohanga Mission. By the late 1830s, Ngāti Tamaoho chief Ēpiha Pūtini began envisioning the Waiuku area as a planned European settlement, which would facilitate trade between the Manukau Harbour and the Waikato River. Ngāti Te Ata used the Waiuku portage to transport goods to the Manukau Harbour, until the Government funded the construction of a bullock track between the Waiuku and Awaroa rivers in the late 1840s.

The New Zealand Government sold Waiuku allotments to settlers in 1851. This included early settler Edward Constable, who established the Kentish Hotel in 1851 or early 1852. The hotel quickly became the focal point for the new settlement of Waiuku, which flourished as a trading port by the mid-1850s. Ngāti Te Ata and European settlers mingled together in the settlement, and Ahipene Kaihau, rangatira of Ngāti Te Ata, was a close confidant of Governor George Grey, who regularly invited to stay at Waiuku. Grey commissioned a ship to service the route between Onehunga and Waiuku.

By 1856, the Māori village of Purapura was established to the south of Waiuku, at the northernmost point on the Awaroa Creek navigable by waka. In 1856, five European families settled to the east at Mauku, and a church called St. Bride's was established for the village. Mauku was the first European settlement visited by the first Māori King, Pōtatau Te Wherowhero, after his coronation in 1858.

One of the founders of St Andrew's Presbyterian Church in Waiuku in the 19th century was Captain Sir John Makgill. Makgill arrived with his family in Waiuku in 1882 and established a farm called 'Brackmont' at Taurangaruru. He eventually increased his holdings there to about 2500 acres, and also bought land at Ōrua Bay. Sir John Makgill died at Brackmont on 14 November 1906. His wife was Margaret Isabella Haldane, sister of Lord Haldane, and their eldest son was George Makgill who spent most of his adult life in Scotland, becoming 11th Baronet of Makgill on his father's death. One other son John E Makgill continued to farm at Taurangaruru, while another Robert Haldane Makgill was a key figure in the development of New Zealand's public health system. He was one of the country's first district health officers, at a time when central government took on greater responsibility for public health. He was to play an important role during the 1918 influenza pandemic and its aftermath, notably as 'the chief architect' of 'the most useful legacy of the 1918 influenza pandemic': the 1920 Health Act.

=== Invasion of the Waikato ===
In 1861, Governor George Grey ordered the construction of the Great South Road further into the Waikato, due to fears of potential invasion of Waikato Tainui. On 9 July 1863, due to fears of the Māori King Movement, Governor Grey proclaimed that all Māori living in the South Auckland area needed to swear loyalty to the Queen and give up their weapons. Most people refused due to strong links to Tainui, leaving for the south before the Government's Invasion of the Waikato. Small numbers of people remained, in order to tend to their farms and for ahi kā. Most Māori who lived south of Auckland felt they had no choice due to their strong ties to Tainui and Pōtatau Te Wherowhero, and were forced to flee to the south.

Immediately prior to the war, the government constructed the Mauku Stockade near Waiuku. On 23 September 1863, a skirmish began at the Māori village of Tītī near Mauku, and nine European soldiers were killed. September saw a number of skirmishes between Ngāti Tamaoho and related hapū and the Mauku Company of Forest Rifles, led by Daniel H. Lusk.

While considered a "friendly" iwi by Grey during the war due to Grey's relationship with Ahipene Kaihau, after the war a combined 43,850 acres (17,750 ha) of Ngāti Te Ata land was confiscated by the Crown in December 1864, with further confiscations in early 1865. Most members of the iwi left for the Waikato in the aftermath of the war. After a period, some members of Ngāti Te Ata when some of the confiscated lands were returned, many living at Moeatoa Marae, opposite the modern Glenbrook Steel Mill, where the Christian Missionary Society mission had been located.

Waiuku township suffered as a trading post after the invasion, as Māori produce from the Waikato and Manukau were no longer sent through Waiuku. A canal scheme was proposed, that would link the Waikato River to the Manukau Harbour, but plans for the canal never progressed.

=== Growth of Waiuku township ===
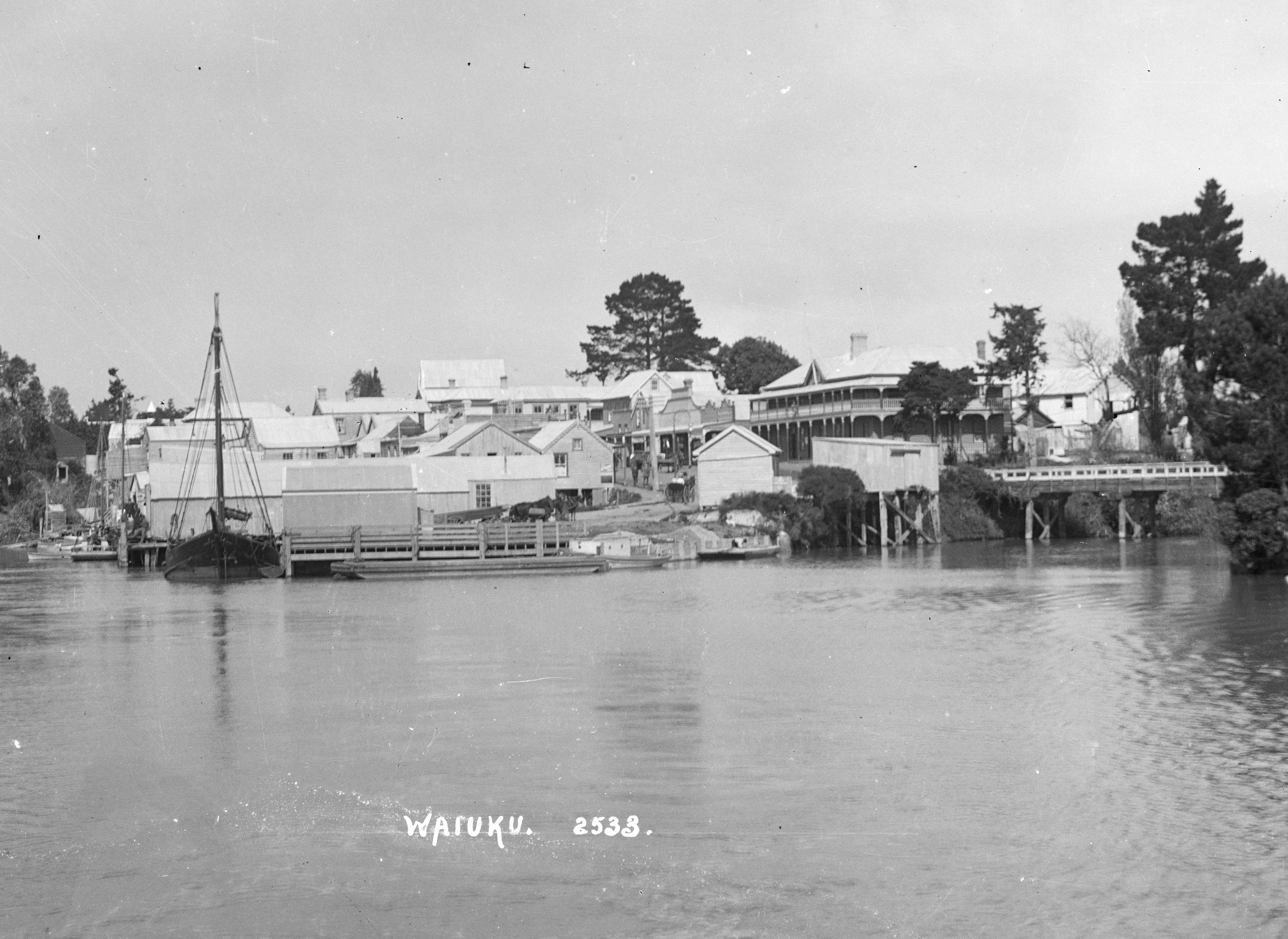
The port of Waiuku along the Waiuku River, circa 1911

In 1868, Edward Constable constructed flax mills at Purapura and Waipapa, which led to Waiuku becoming a centre for the flax trade in the 1870s. Between 1870 and 1900, Waiuku, Karaka and the Āwhitu Peninsula became major centres for the kauri gum industry.

Waiuku developed as a town when refrigeration made dairy farming financially viable in the late 19th century. Dairy pastures were developed to the south at Otaua and Aka Aka in the late 1880s. Development of the area was slow, in part due to the shallow port on the Waiuku River hindering ships at low tide. In 1901, oyster reserves were established along the Waiuku River, and by 1915, a butter factory had been established at Waiuku.

The first great Waiuku fire occurred on 28 August 1916, which destroyed many of the shops and offices to the east of Queen Street. The fire leads the Waiuku Town Board to proclaim that areas of central Waiuku could only have new buildings constructed from brick or masonry.

During the 1920s, 96 Ngāti Te Ata families were evicted from Moeatoa Marae. The land had gone into public administration after the death of the titled landholder of the marae land (the Māori Land Court having individuated Ngāti Te Ata land titles in the late 19th century).

On 5 January 1922, the Waiuku branch railway line was opened between Paerata and Waiuku. This led to the port of Waiuku no longer being used; with passenger services to Onehunga ceasing in 1925, and shipping ceasing a few years after. Within a few years, the railway was no longer financially viable, as local residents preferred to use roads. Passenger rail services to Waiuku were replaced by buses in 1948, and goods trains cease using the Waiuku branch line in 1967. A spur to the steel mill (detailed below) was opened in 1968, saving the line from being closed entirely.

In 1939, Ngāti Te Ata land southwest of Waiuku was requisitioned by the Department of Public Works, in order to protect land against coastal erosion, and to establish the Waiuku State Forest. Further land was requisitioned in 1959 to expand the forest.

By 1955, the town had grown enough that the Borough of Waiuku was created, independent from Franklin County.

In 1966, the New Zealand Government announced a scheme to establish a steel mill near Waiuku. The Glenbrook Steel Mill began operating in 1968, and from 1969 began harvesting ironsand from requisitioned Ngāti Te Ata lands along the Waikato River.

Over time, Waiuku has developed into a service centre for the surrounding rural area, and residence for many New Zealand Steel employees.

== Demographics ==
Stats NZ describes Waiuku as a small urban area, which covers 7.87 km^{2} (3.04 sq mi). It had an estimated population of 9,860 as of June 2025, with a population density of 1,253 people per km^{2}.

Historical population
Year	Pop.	±% p.a.
2006	7,458	—
2013	8,412	+1.73%
2018	9,273	+1.97%
2023	9,531	+0.55%
The 2006 population is for a smaller area of 7.71 km^{2}. Source:

Waiuku had a population of 9,531 in the 2023 New Zealand census, an increase of 258 people (2.8%) since the 2018 census, and an increase of 1,119 people (13.3%) since the 2013 census. There were 4,716 males, 4,788 females and 30 people of other genders in 3,396 dwellings. 2.3% of people identified as LGBTIQ+. The median age was 39.4 years (compared with 38.1 years nationally). There were 2,007 people (21.1%) aged under 15 years, 1,623 (17.0%) aged 15 to 29, 4,197 (44.0%) aged 30 to 64, and 1,704 (17.9%) aged 65 or older.

People could identify as more than one ethnicity. The results were 81.0% European (Pākehā); 22.0% Māori; 6.7% Pasifika; 8.0% Asian; 0.8% Middle Eastern, Latin American and African New Zealanders (MELAA); and 2.2% other, which includes people giving their ethnicity as "New Zealander". English was spoken by 97.2%, Māori language by 3.4%, Samoan by 0.5%, and other languages by 9.5%. No language could be spoken by 1.9% (e.g. too young to talk). New Zealand Sign Language was known by 0.3%. The percentage of people born overseas was 21.9, compared with 28.8% nationally.

Religious affiliations were 27.2% Christian, 1.7% Hindu, 0.5% Islam, 1.0% Māori religious beliefs, 0.3% Buddhist, 0.5% New Age, 0.1% Jewish, and 1.5% other religions. People who answered that they had no religion were 58.6%, and 8.7% of people did not answer the census question.

Of those at least 15 years old, 1,146 (15.2%) people had a bachelor's or higher degree, 4,263 (56.7%) had a post-high school certificate or diploma, and 2,118 (28.1%) people exclusively held high school qualifications. The median income was $41,500, compared with $41,500 nationally. 954 people (12.7%) earned over $100,000 compared to 12.1% nationally. The employment status of those at least 15 was that 3,864 (51.4%) people were employed full-time, 816 (10.8%) were part-time, and 213 (2.8%) were unemployed.

Individual statistical areas
Name	Area (km^{2})	Population	Density (per km^{2})	Dwellings	Median age	Median income
Tamakae	1.50	2,601	1,734	999	42.5 years	$38,600
Hamilton Estate	2.26	2,697	1,193	936	38.2 years	$41,200
Waiuku Central	1.13	1,344	1,189	483	36.1 years	$41,100
Waiuku East	0.83	1,791	2,158	609	36.3 years	$40,500
Kendallvale	2.14	1,095	512	372	46.8 years	$52,300
New Zealand					38.1 years	$41,500

== Local government ==
The first local government in the area were the Waipipi and Waiuku Highway Districts, which were formed in 1867 to administer road upkeep and public works projects. The highway districts split Waiuku township in two. Waiuku became a part of the Franklin County in 1914, and within a few months the Waiuku Town District was established on 29 July 1914, as an entity within the county. In 1939, the Waiuku Town Board offices were constructed on Queen Street opposite the Kentish Hotel, which were in use by 1940. By 1955, Waiuku had grown enough to become a borough, independent from the Franklin County. The Waiuku Borough had two majors during its existence: R. S. Whiteside who served from 1955 to 1971, and S. K. Lawrence, who served from 1971 to 1989.

In 1989, the Borough of Waiuku was merged with the newly formed Franklin District. In November 2010, all cities and districts of the Auckland Region were amalgamated into a single body, governed by the Auckland Council.

Waiuku is a part of the Franklin local board area. The residents of Waiuku elect a local board, and one councillor from the Franklin ward to sit on the Auckland Council.

== Attractions ==
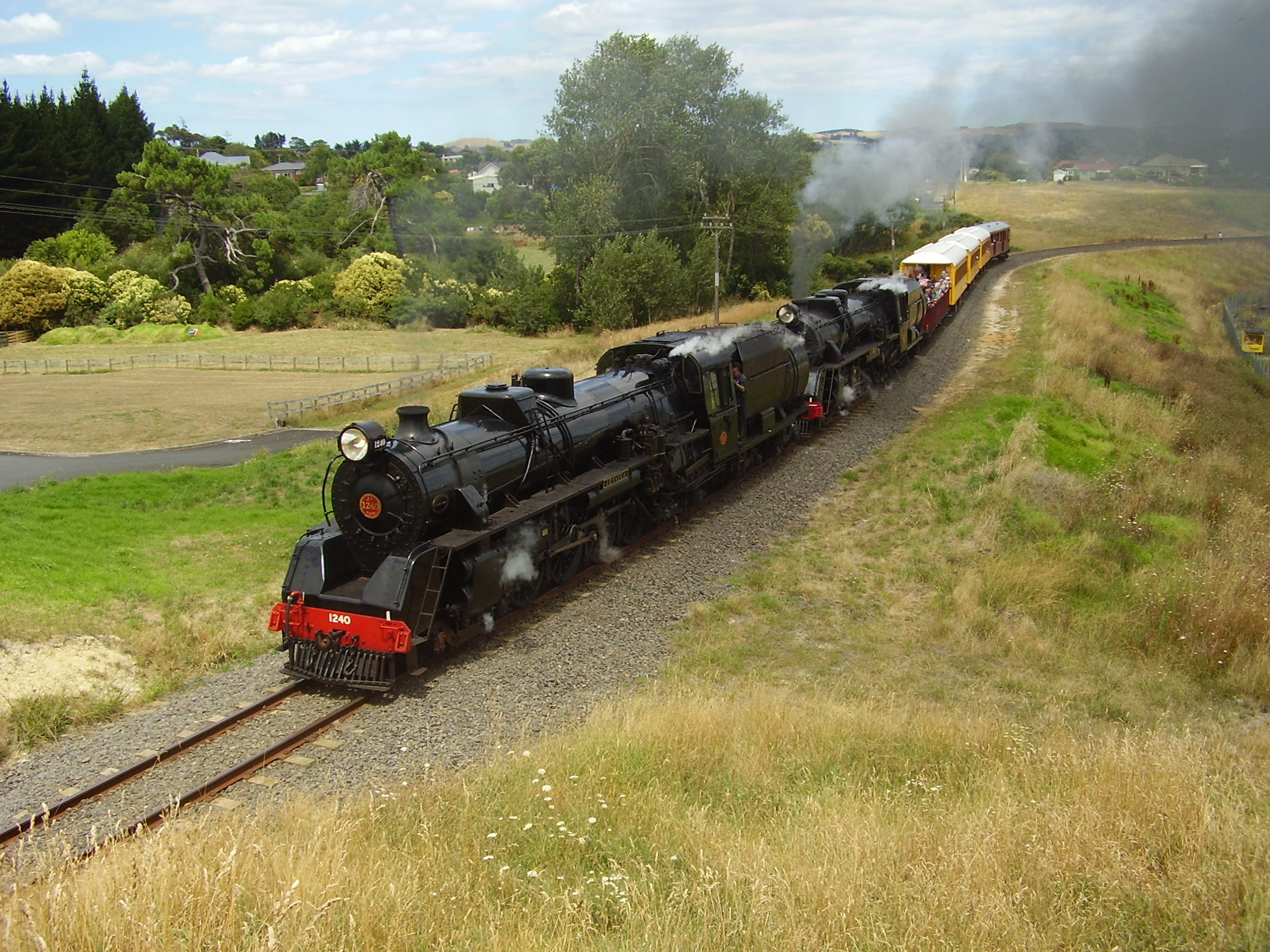
The Glenbrook Vintage Railway

The local pub, called The Kentish Hotel, is New Zealand's longest continuously licensed hotel. It was built by one of the first European settlers in Waiuku, Edward Constable, as an inn in 1851. His presence can still be felt in the name of the pub (he was from Kent), and the street behind it - Constable Road. The Kentish, with its ornate verandahs, provides a historical centre point to the town and the nearby Tamakae Reserve.

At the entrance to the Reserve stands a statue of Tamakae carved from swamp kauri logs. The logs were found during some excavation work at New Zealand Steel and gifted to the local iwi (tribe), Ngati Te Ata. The Reserve also has a small historic "village" with several restored buildings including Hartmann House, dating back to 1886, now operating as a local craft studio, Pollock Cottage (1890), Waiuku Jail (1865) and The Creamery (1890s). The nearby Waiuku Museum has colonial era memorabilia, Māori artifacts, old sailing boats and historic photographs. A heritage trail around town points out further sites of historic interest in Waiuku including Wesley Methodist Church (1883), from where visitors to the town can get a panoramic view across Waiuku and the waterfront reserve.

Waiuku Museum, a museum on local history, opened in 1965.

Glenbrook Vintage Railway is a heritage railway opened in 1977. It operates the section of the Waiuku branch line from Glenbrook to Waiuku that was closed in 1967 and was in the process of being lifted.

The West Coast black sand beach, Karioitahi, is located nearby.

Waiuku has a pistol club with a ranges, and one of New Zealand's largest airsoft clubs.

== Education ==
Waiuku College is a secondary school (years 9–13) with a roll of 1,002.

Waiuku Primary School, View Road School and Sandspit Road School are full primary schools (years 1–8) with rolls of 368, 185 and 268 students, respectively.

All these schools are coeducational. Rolls are as of July 2026.

== Notable people ==
Notable people from Waiuku include:

- David Aspin, Olympic wrestler
- Zinzan Brooke, rugby player
- Stephen Donald, rugby player
- Ross Ihaka, statistics professor
- Elsie Locke, peace activist, historian and writer. Locke spent much of her childhood in Waiuku, and set her children's book The End of the Harbour: An Historical Novel for Children (1968) in 1860s Waiuku.
- George Makgill, Scottish baronet and novelist. Makgill's father owned a station at Waiuku in the 1870s.
- John Campbell Paterson, Bishop of Auckland from 1994 to 2010
- Kevin Skinner, rugby player
- Pat Walsh, rugby player

== Bibliography ==
- Mackintosh, Lucy (2021). Shifting Grounds: Deep Histories of Tāmaki Makaurau Auckland. Bridget Williams Books. doi:10.7810/9781988587332. ISBN 978-1-988587-33-2.
- Muir, Brian (1980), Old Waiuku and District, Auckland, Wikidata Q115870241
- Muir, Brian (1983), Waiuku and Districts: The Romantic Years, Waiuku: W.J. Deed Printing, Wikidata Q116027039
