= Kentish Hotel =

Pub in Waiuku, New Zealand

Coordinates: 37.24850°S 174.72984°E

The Kentish Hotel is a pub in Waiuku, New Zealand that lays claim to the longest continuous liquor licence in the country. The Kentish Hotel has stood the test of time as being one of the most famous established watering holes in the Franklin area since it was first granted its licence to sell liquor in 1853.

== Historical significance ==
Built in 1852 by Edward Constable who emigrated from Maidstone, Kent in England. Constable then went on to apply to the Colonial Secretary for a Publican's Special Licence and Licence No.47 was granted on 10 January 1853. That same licence still continues today and the hotel lays claim to the longest continuous liquor licence in New Zealand.

Throughout its long history the Kentish has been at the heart of Waiuku life since it was built. It occupies a central location in Waiuku town, is near the entrance to the Waiuku harbor, and opposite the popular Tamakae reserve which serves as a base for the Waiuku Museum and other attractions.

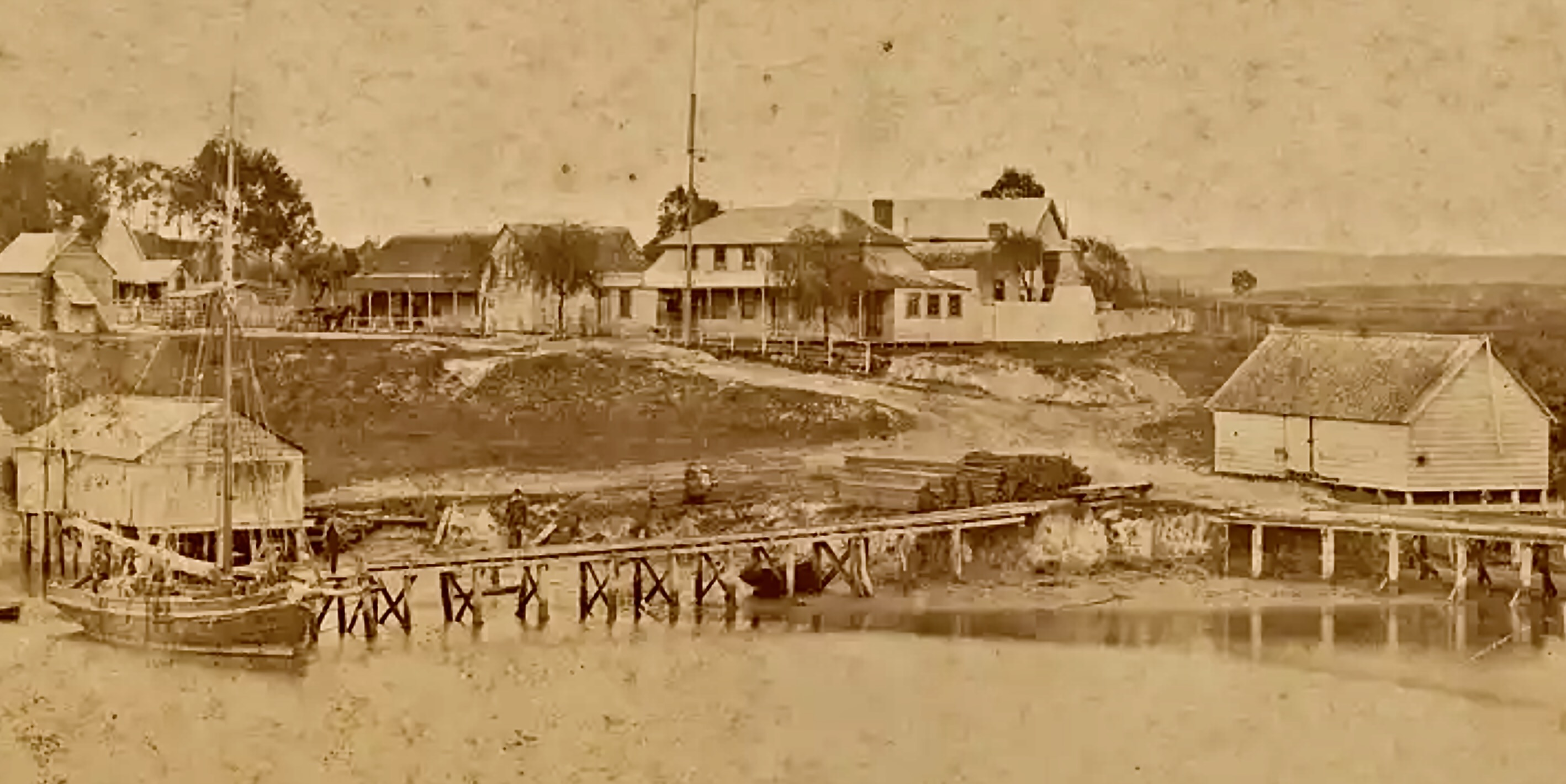
Wharf and Hotel in 1867

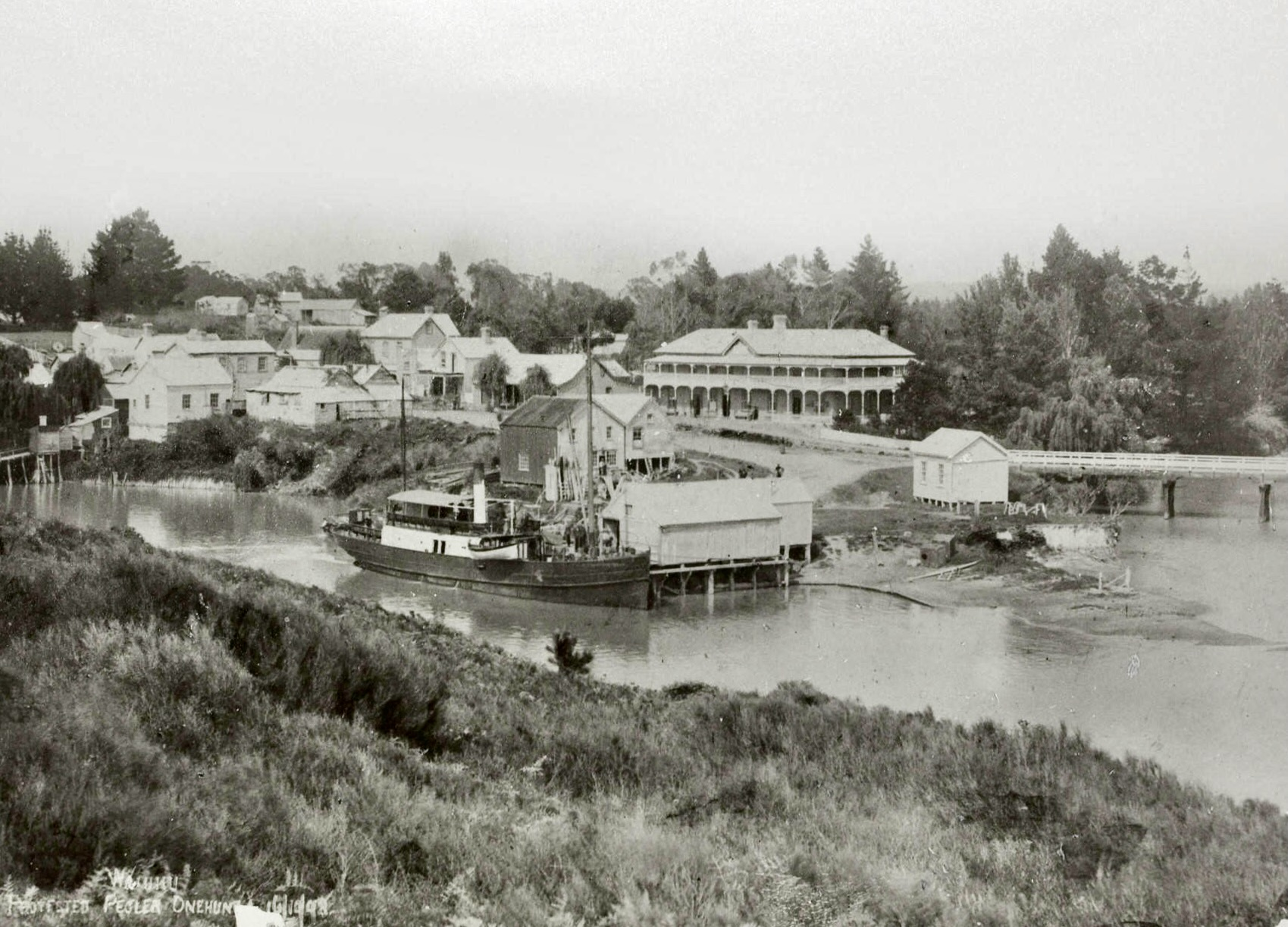
SS Weka and Hotel in 1898, after being rebuilt in 1897

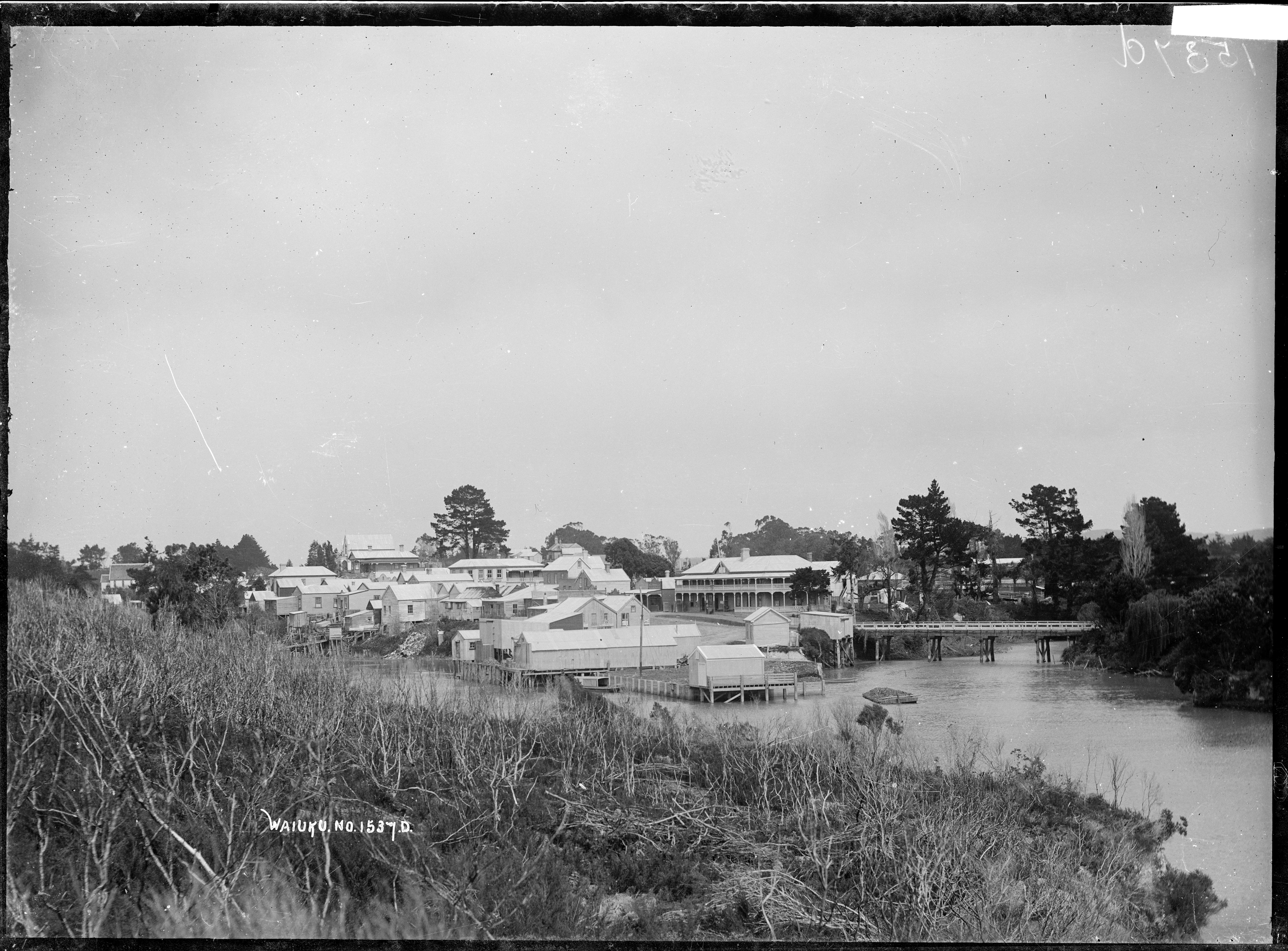
Waiuku in 1917

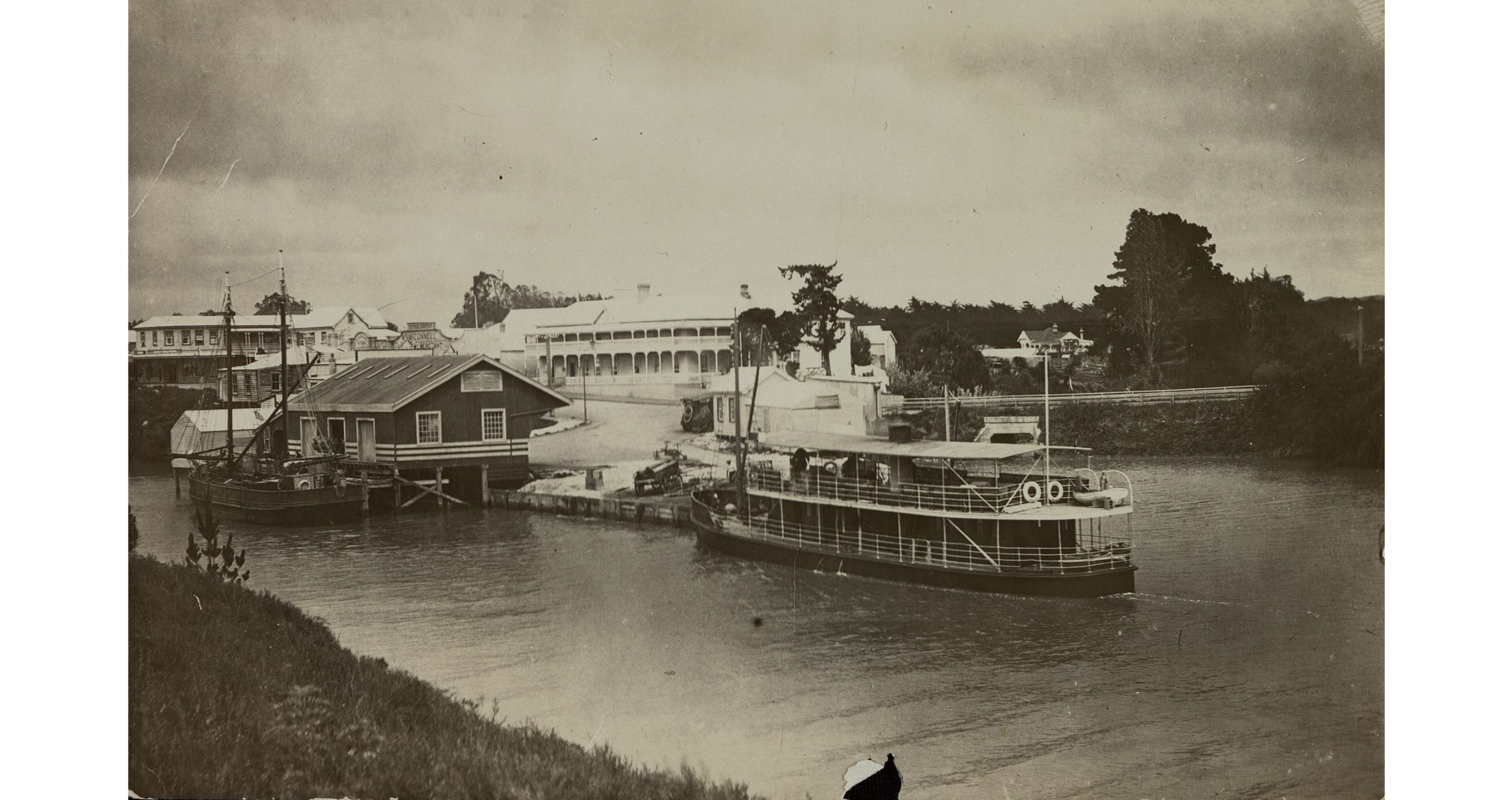
MV Waiuku and Hotel in 1917

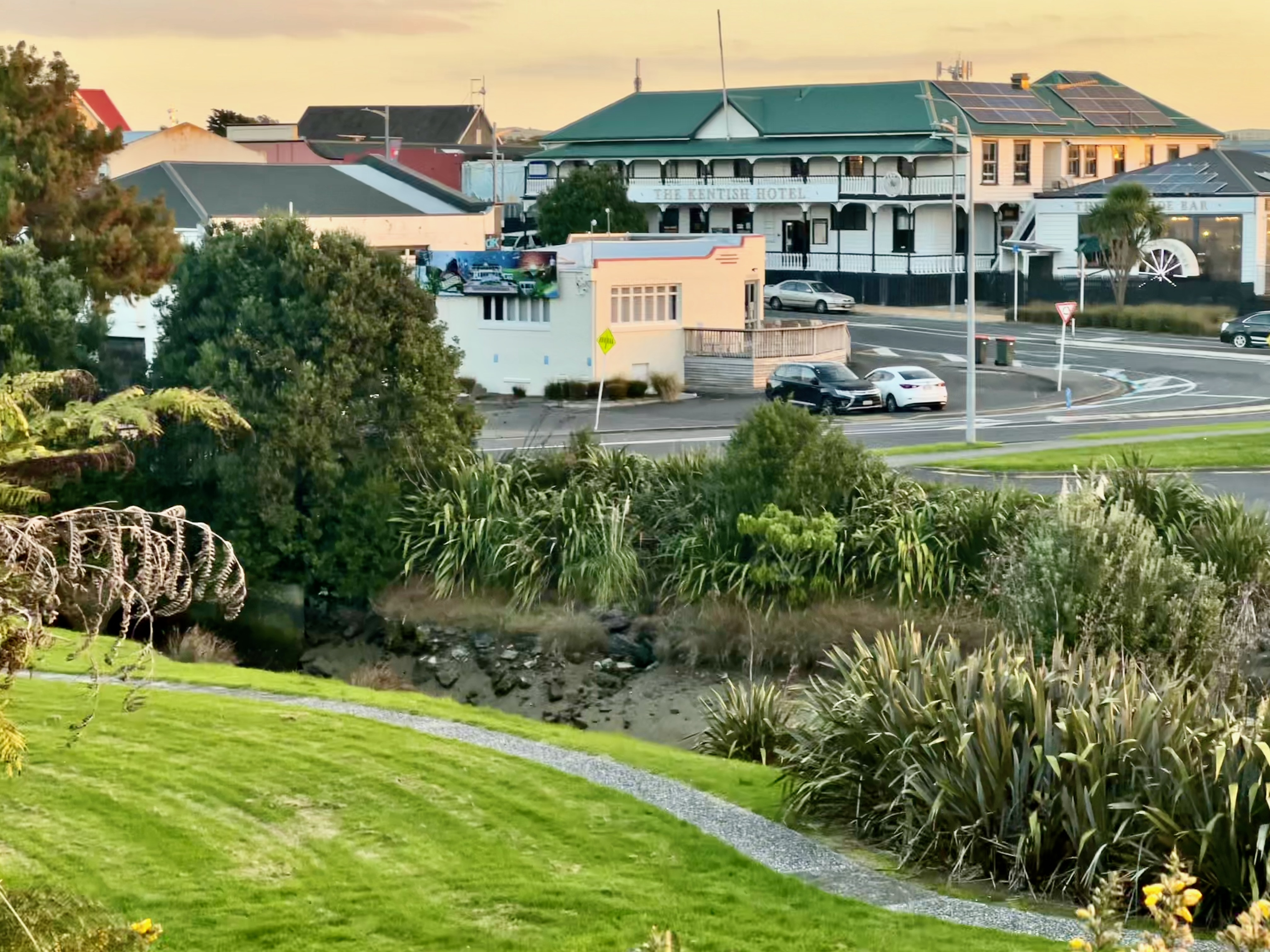
River and Hotel in 2026

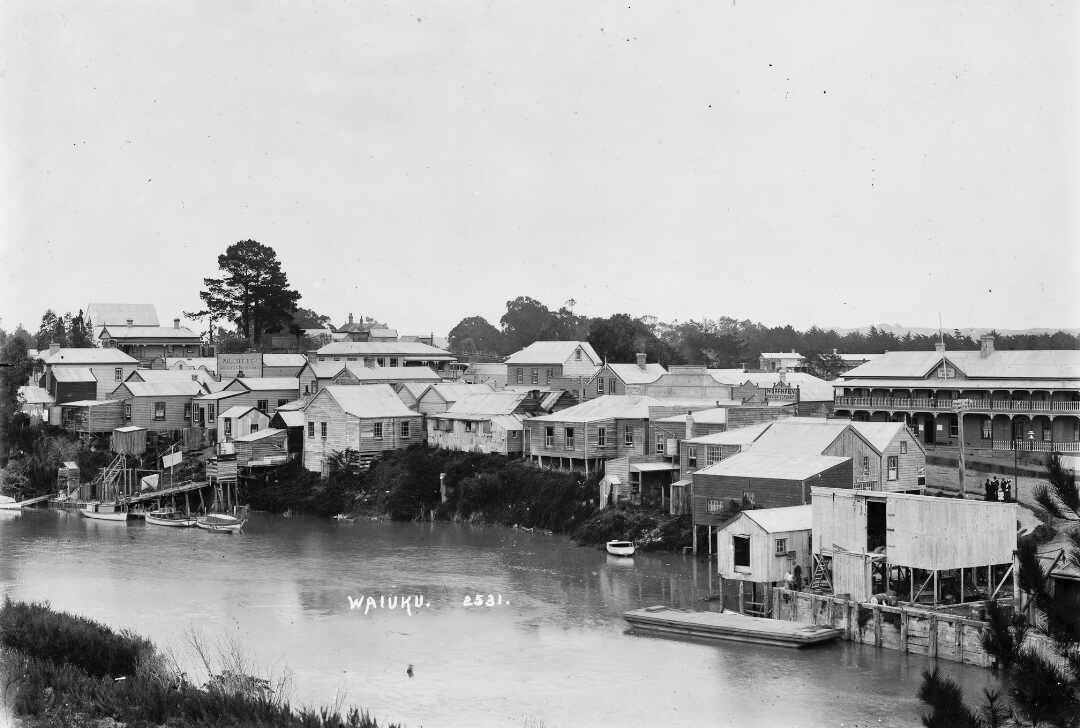
Waiuku River in 1915

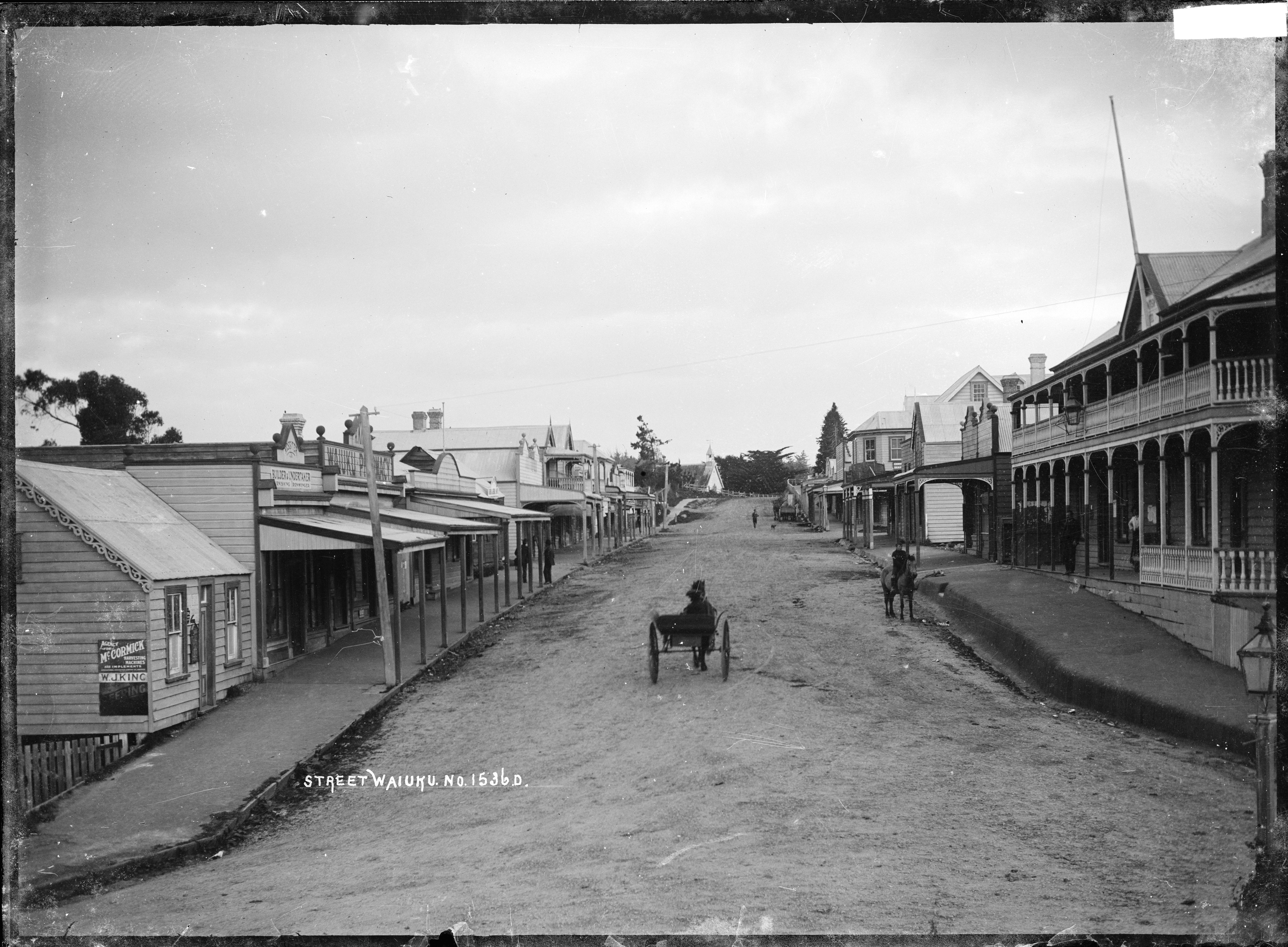
Queen Street and Hotel in 1915

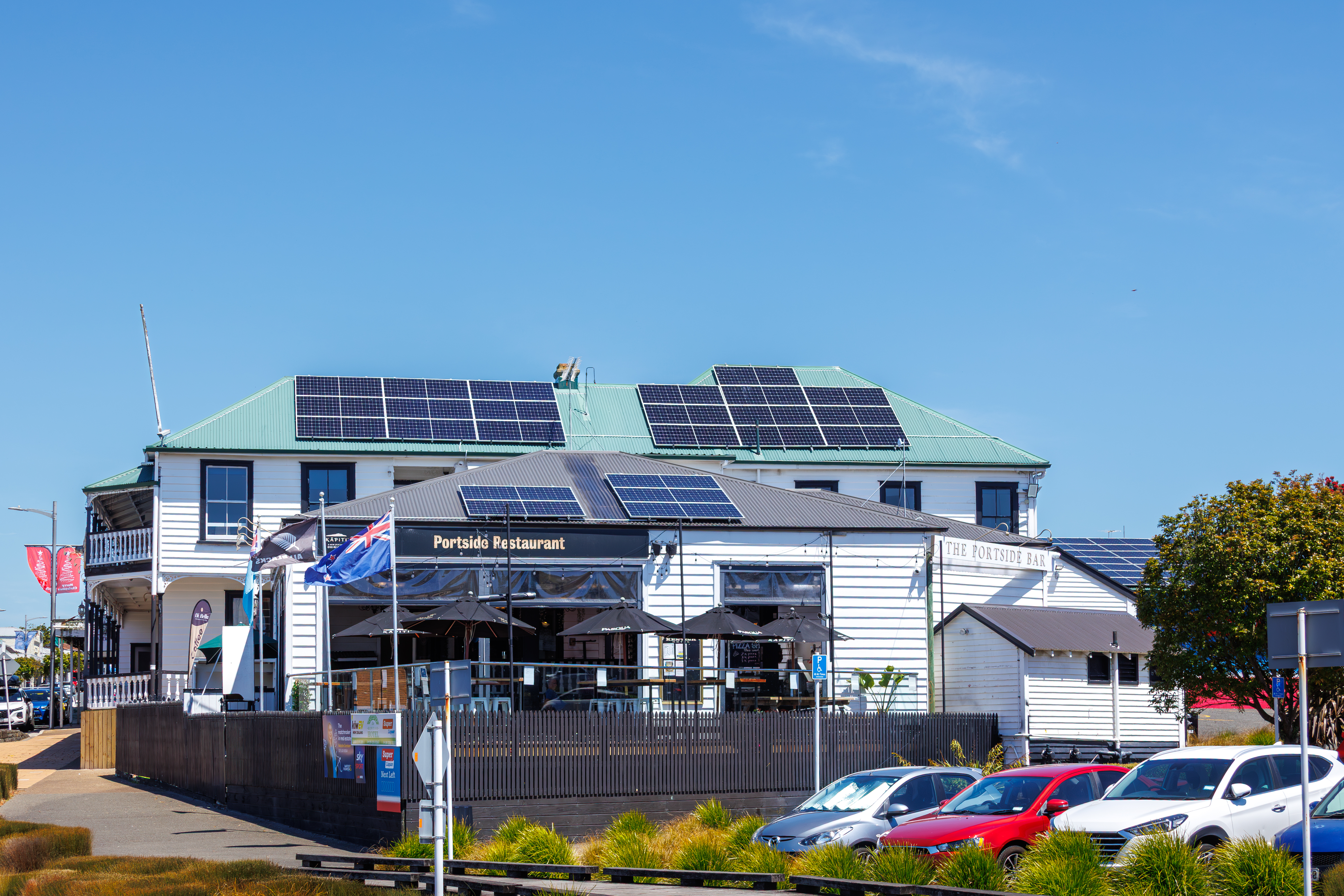
A garden bar, added about 2007

== Challenges and triumph ==
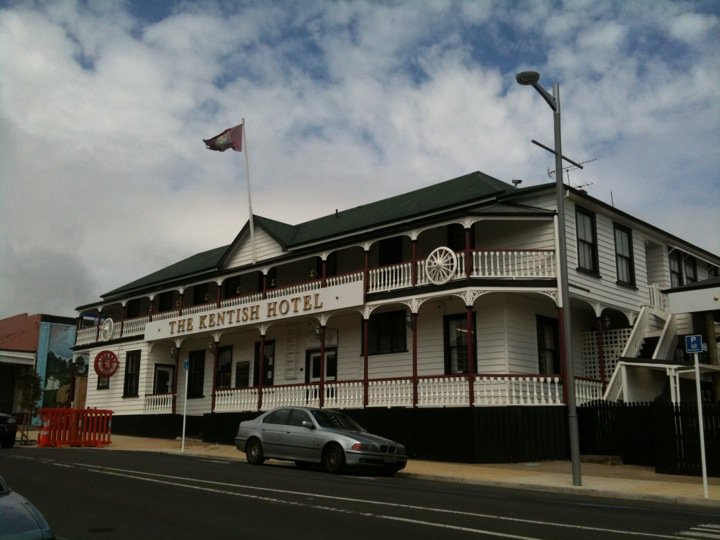
The Kentish Hotel in 2010

The Constables established the Hotel as an icon in early Auckland by advertising on the front page of the New Zealander, the most popular newspaper of the period. Travellers began recommending the establishment and it grew to be immensely popular, even hosting such dignitaries as the Māori King Te Whero Whero, Sir George Grey, Richard Seddon, Sir Joseph Ward and William Massey.

With its position along a major trading route between the fledgling colonial Auckland and rich, fertile lands of the Waikato, the Kentish thrived. Through the tense times during the land wars of the Waikato beginning 1862-1863, the Kentish managed to survive.

In 1926, the hotel nearly burned down when a fire destroyed a block of wooden buildings opposite. As the wind fanned the flames a host of volunteers poured water and hung wet sheets over the facade saving most of the building from significant damage.

Recently the Kentish has expanded adding a popular outdoors area overlooking the harbor and Tamakae Reserve. The Kentish went into receivership on 14 August 2012, and with it the longest held liquor licence in New Zealand.
