= Bog-wood =

Wood from trees preserved in peat bogs

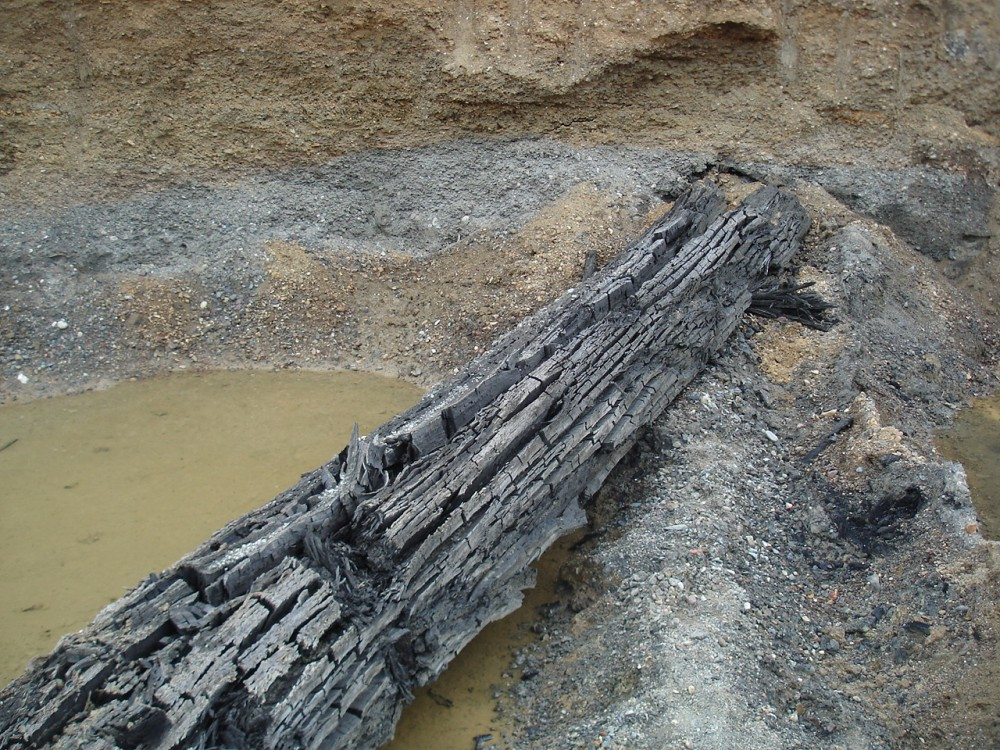
Bog-wood from the Sava River, Bosnia and Herzegovina

Bog-wood (also spelled bogwood or bog wood), also known as abonos and, especially amongst pipe smokers, as morta, is timber from trees that have been buried in peat bogs and preserved from decay by the acidic and anaerobic bog conditions, sometimes for hundreds or even thousands of years. The wood is usually stained brown by tannins dissolved in the acidic water. Bog-wood represents the early stages in the fossilisation of wood, also referred to as sub-fossil wood, with further stages ultimately forming jet, lignite and coal over a period of many millions of years. Bog-wood may come from any tree species naturally growing near or in bogs, including oak (Quercus – "bog oak"), pine (Pinus), yew (Taxus), swamp cypress (Taxodium) and kauri (Agathis). Bog-wood is often removed from fields and placed in clearance cairns. It is a rare form of timber that is claimed to be "comparable to some of the world's most expensive tropical hardwoods."

== Formation process ==
Bog-wood is created from the trunks of trees that have lain in bogs, and bog-like conditions such as lakes, river bottoms and swamps, for centuries and even millennia. Deprived of oxygen, the wood undergoes the process of fossilization as lime and silica sediments replace the hemicellulose in the wood's cell walls.

Water flow and depth play a special role in the creation of bog-wood. Currents bind the minerals and iron in the water with tannins in the wood, naturally staining the wood in the process. This centuries- or millenia- long process, often termed "maturation," turns the wood from golden-brown to completely black, while increasing its hardness to such a level that it can only be carved with the use of specialty cutting tools. Because maturation process first affects the surface layers and any wood that is exposed due to prior damage, bog-wood may also exhibit a graded coloration, with darker tones near the surface and lighter tones in the interior.

While the time necessary for the oak to transform into bog-wood varies, the "maturation" commonly lasts thousands of years. Due to the ecological reasons mentioned above, no two trunks can be found of the same color.

== Excavation sites ==
Sites of high quality bog-wood in the world are very rare. In the sites expected to yield it, bog-wood is hard to find, and access to the river bank and its bed is often difficult. Therefore, extensive preparations and the engagement of professional divers are necessary for bog-wood recovery. Bog-wood is located in conditions of total darkness, and its extraction marks its first exposure to light after centuries of entombment.

In England and Ireland, the three main types of bog-wood that can be found are yew, oak and pine. Other documented varieties of bog-wood include "pine, maple, elm, poplar, beech, ash and alder." Reserves of the ancient wood can also be found in Russia and Ukraine, where the northern region has a climate favorable to the growth of oak.

In Croatia, bog-wood is typically found in the valley of the Sava River and its tributaries. The age of bog-wood found in Croatian rivers ranges from several hundred years in the southern rivers to the oldest retrieved so far, from the Krapina River, dated at 8290 years old.

In Serbia, bog-wood over 8,000 years old is found in the valleys of the Danube River, Sava River and their tributaries, primarily in the province of Vojvodina.

== Processing ==
Bog-wood must be desiccated carefully, usually through air-drying, to prevent cracking because of the high tension in its linear grain structure. Extracted logs must be wrapped in waterproof material and dried carefully to prevent warping. While air-drying is the most common and safest method, successful drying is also sometimes possible through the use of a specialized kiln. After processing, most of the raw wood is not suitable for further use. For these reasons, plus its rarity, the price of high quality raw bog-wood is quite high.

== Aesthetics ==
Bog-wood is characterized by natural staining and variations in color, and the direction of growth rings. Well preserved bog-wood is not affected by weather conditions or organisms which would change its strength and appearance. Semi-dry bog-wood is sometimes of a golden or copper color, or with a tint of some other hue, and is exceptionally hard. Older wood can be completely black yet possess the rich variations in hue characteristic of “live” wood. This dark hue is a special feature of bog-wood as a construction material, whether it is used for the making of semi-manufactured goods, veneer or planks. Bog oak was also used as a less expensive alternative to ebony wood

== Uses ==
Because bog-wood can remain free of decay for thousands of years it is of use in dendrochronology, often providing records much older than living trees. Wooden artifacts lost or buried in bogs become preserved as bog-wood, and are important in archaeology.

Bog-wood may be used in joinery to make furniture or wood carving. Bog-wood sometimes has aesthetically interesting shapes (similar to driftwood) and may be used as ornaments. As bog-wood dries out, it may crack or split, but this does not necessarily detract from its aesthetic qualities. Due to its natural color, it is a traditionally favored wood for the carving of dirks (bìodagan) and sgian-dubh in the Scottish Highlands.

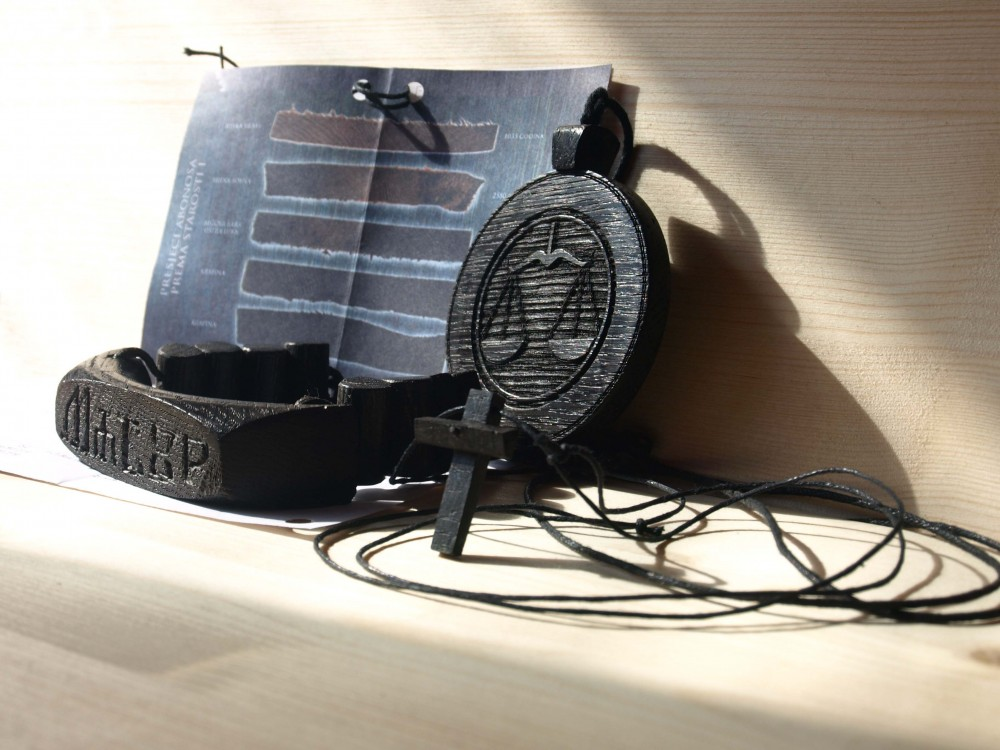
Souvenirs made out of morta / bog-wood

During the nineteenth century, bog oak was used to make carved decorative items such as furniture, marquetry, jewelry and in some parts of the world it is still used to craft unique artifacts. Prized in the Tudor period for its dark hue, bog oak was used to construct the throne of Peter the Great as well in the construction of Venetian palaces and the bedroom suite of Louis XIV. Bog-wood has also traditionally been used to construct items for ecclesiastical use such as statues and altar frames. It has also been utilized as a tonewood in the construction of high-end guitars. Today, modern drying techniques have made it possible to preserve larger planks of bog oak that are suitable for floor coverings, furniture, doors, window frames, and sculptures.

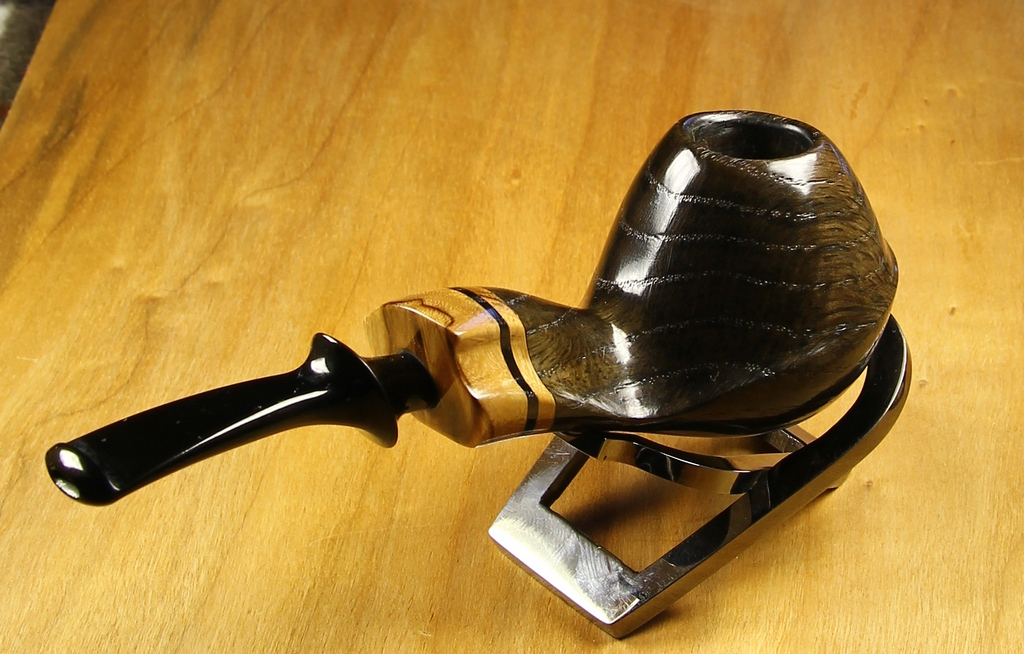
Tobacco pipe made of morta / bog-wood

Bog-wood remains in use as a material for tobacco pipes as an alternative to briar wood with distinct properties. It is favored as a material for tobacco pipes because of a high percentage of minerals, reaching up to 12%, which makes bog-wood especially resistant to burning. Because the underground currents involved in bog-wood's maturation minimize traces of tannin, resin and other flavor-altering components, pipes constructed from bog-wood provide a relatively neutral taste during tobacco smoking. Due to the challenges of extraction and processing, today there are a relatively small number of pipemakers who make pipes out of bog-wood.

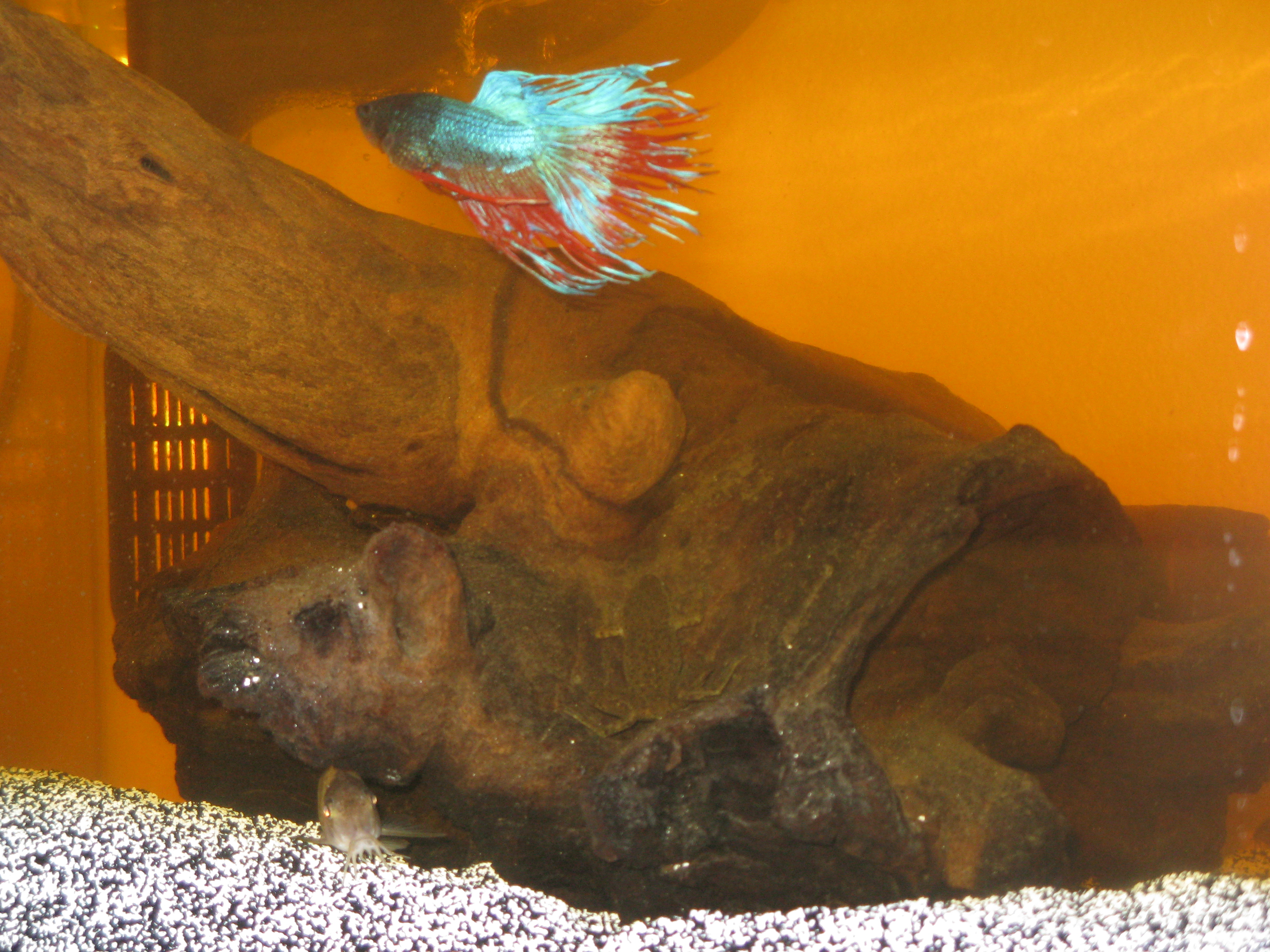
Bog wood in an aquarium releases tannins into the water, turning the water brown.

Bog-wood is used in aquaria for ornaments, providing hiding places for fish and a growing surface for plants such as Java fern. Additionally, the leaching of organic compounds such as tannins into the water causes a brown coloration.

== See also ==
- Aquarium substrates
- Driftwood
- Mopane wood, recovered from deserts and often sold as an alternative to bogwood for aquaria; it is sometimes incorrectly labelled as bogwood or charred bogwood.
- Swamp kauri
- Sweet Track, a timber causeway in Somerset, England, its timbers preserved in waterlogged ground for over 5,800 years.
