= Mattucashlass =

Armpit dagger used as part of traditional Scottish Highland dress

A mattucashlass is a type of dagger worn concealed in the armpit and primarily used for close combat, part of traditional Scottish male Highland dress. It is also referred to as an armpit dagger or a sleeve dagger in English. In Scots, the alternative name skene-ochil or skene-occles can also be found.

== Etymology ==
The term mattucashlass derives from Scottish Gaelic: biodag-achlais (Scottish Gaelic pronunciation: [pit̪akˈaxl̪ˠɪʃ], biodag meaning "dagger" and achlais "armpit") presumably via the dialectal by-form miodag, which is attested in Shaw's 1788 Galic and English Dictionary.

It is also known in Gaelic as the sgian-achlais (sgian meaning "knife"), from which the Scots term skene-ochil or skene-occles is derived.

== See also ==
- Sgian-dubh
