= Sgian dubh =

Ceremonial knife

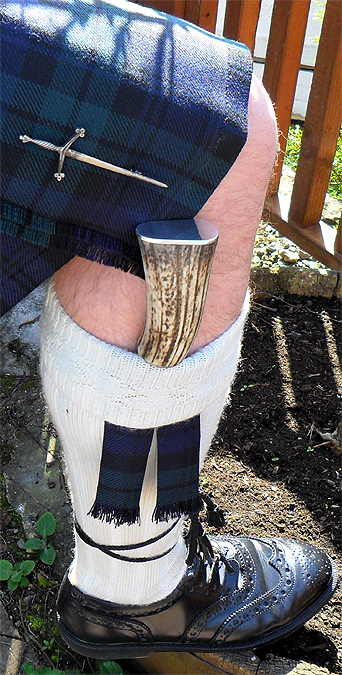
Staghorn sgian dubh being worn on the leg

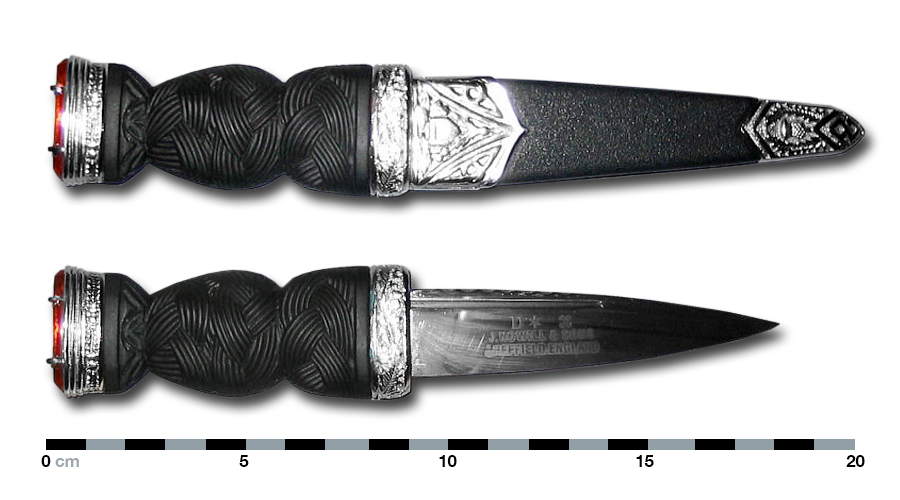
Sgian dubh with and without sheath

A sgian dubh (/ˌskiːən ˈduː/ skee-ən-DOO; Scottish Gaelic pronunciation: [s̪kʲənˈt̪u]) is a small, single-edged knife worn as part of traditional Scottish Highland dress. It is worn tucked into the top of the kilt hose with the hilt visible.

== Etymology and spelling ==
The name comes from the Scottish Gaelic sgian-dubh, from sgian ('knife') and dubh ('black', also with the secondary meaning of 'hidden'.). Although sgian is feminine, so that a modern Gael might refer to a black knife as sgian dhubh, the term for the ceremonial knife is a set-phrase containing a historical form with blocked lenition. Other spellings are found in English, including skean-dhu and skene-dhu. The Gaelic plural, sgianan-dubha, is only rarely encountered in English.

== Origins ==
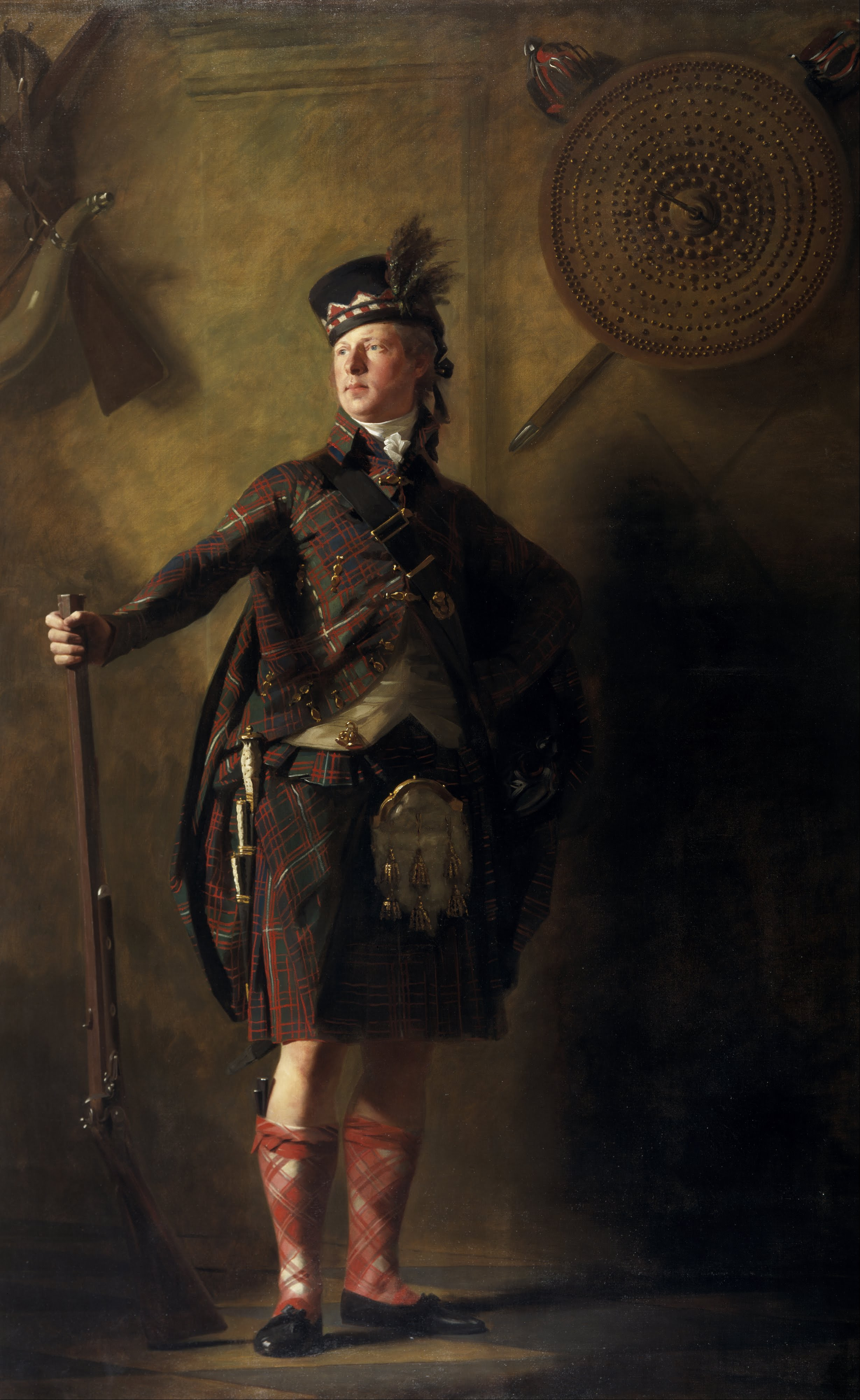
Portrait by Henry Raeburn of Alasdair Ranaldson MacDonell of Glengarry in 1812

The sgian-dubh may have evolved from the sgian-achlais, a dagger that could be concealed under the armpit. Used by the Scots of the 16th, 17th and 18th centuries, this knife was slightly larger than the average modern sgian-dubh and was carried in the upper sleeve or lining of the body of the jacket.

Draconian Scots laws introduced by the Scots Privy Council under the Stewart King in the late 1500s, intended to reduce interclan honour feuds and duelling, included the outlawing of hidden weapons. {Basilikon Doron 1599}. This writ by the Scots King was impossible to enforce north of the Highland line, and so the carrying of weapons continued in the Highlands until the suppression period (subsequent to the Battle of Culloden in 1746). Nevertheless, the transition from the carrying of the last resort weapon (Sgian) may have begun to transition from armpit pocket to top of hose on the leg at this time. However, codes of Highland courtesy and etiquette would demand that when entering the home of a friend, any concealed weapons would be revealed. It follows that the sgian-achlais would be removed from its hiding place and displayed in the stocking top held securely by the garters.

The sgian-dubh also resembles the small skinning knife that is part of the typical set of hunting knives. These sets contain a butchering knife with a 9-to-10-inch (23 to 25 cm) blade, and a skinner with a blade of about 4 inches (10 cm). These knives usually had antler handles, as do many early sgian-dubhs. The larger knife is likely the ancestor of the modern dirk.

The sgian-dubh can be seen in portraits of kilted men of the mid-19th century. A portrait by Sir Henry Raeburn of Colonel Alasdair Ranaldson MacDonell of Glengarry hangs in the National Gallery of Scotland; it shows hanging from his belt on his right hand side a Highland Scottish dirk, and visible at the top of his right stocking what appears to be a nested set of two sgian-dubhs. A similar sgian-dubh is in the collection of The National Museum of Antiquities of Scotland.

== Construction ==
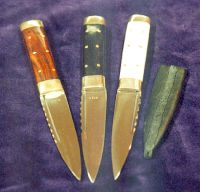
Selection of sgian-dubhs

The early blades varied in construction, some having a "clipped" (famously found on the Bowie knife) or "drop" point. The "spear-point" tip has now become universal. The earliest known blades, some housed in the National Museum of Scotland in Edinburgh, are made from German or Scandinavian steel, which was highly prized by the Highlanders. Scalloped filework on the back of the blade is common on all Scottish knives. A short blade of 3 to 3.5 inches (7.5 to 9 cm) is typical.

Traditionally the scabbard is made of leather reinforced with wood and fitted with mounts of silver or some other metal which may be cast or engraved with designs ranging from Scottish thistles, Celtic knotwork, or heraldic elements such as a crest. While this makes for more popular and expensive knives, the sheath is hidden from view in the stocking while the sgian-dubh is worn. The sheaths of many modern sgian-dubhs are made of plastic mounted with less expensive metal fittings.

Since the modern sgian-dubh is worn mainly as a ceremonial item of dress and is usually not employed for cutting food or self-defence, blades are often of a simple construction. These are typically made from stainless steel. The hilts used on many modern sgian-dubhs are made of plastic that has been molded to resemble carved wood and fitted with cast metal mounts and synthetic decorative stones. Some are not even knives at all, but a plastic handle and sheath cast as one piece. Other examples are luxurious and expensive art pieces, with hand-carved ebony or bog wood hilts, sterling silver fittings and may have pommels set with genuine cairngorm stones and blades of Damascus steel or etched with Celtic designs or heraldic motifs.

== Legality ==
In Scotland, England and Wales, carrying an offensive weapon is illegal, but can be permitted as part of wearing national costume. Carrying a sgian dubh has sometimes been banned in Britain; for example, they were banned from a school dance in Scotland, and initially banned for the 2014 celebration of the Battle of Bannockburn.

When travelling by air with a sgian dubh, it is prohibited in some countries from having it in the cabin, but it is allowed in checked baggage.

Piper Jeff McCarthy was fined CA$221 on 2 November 2016 for wearing a sgian dubh in his kilt hose while performing in Montreal, Canada. McCarthy contested the fine, which was cancelled, and his knife was returned.

== See also ==
- Dirk § Highland dirk
- Mattucashlass
- Kirpan
