= Swamp kauri =

Prehistoric peat-preserved trees

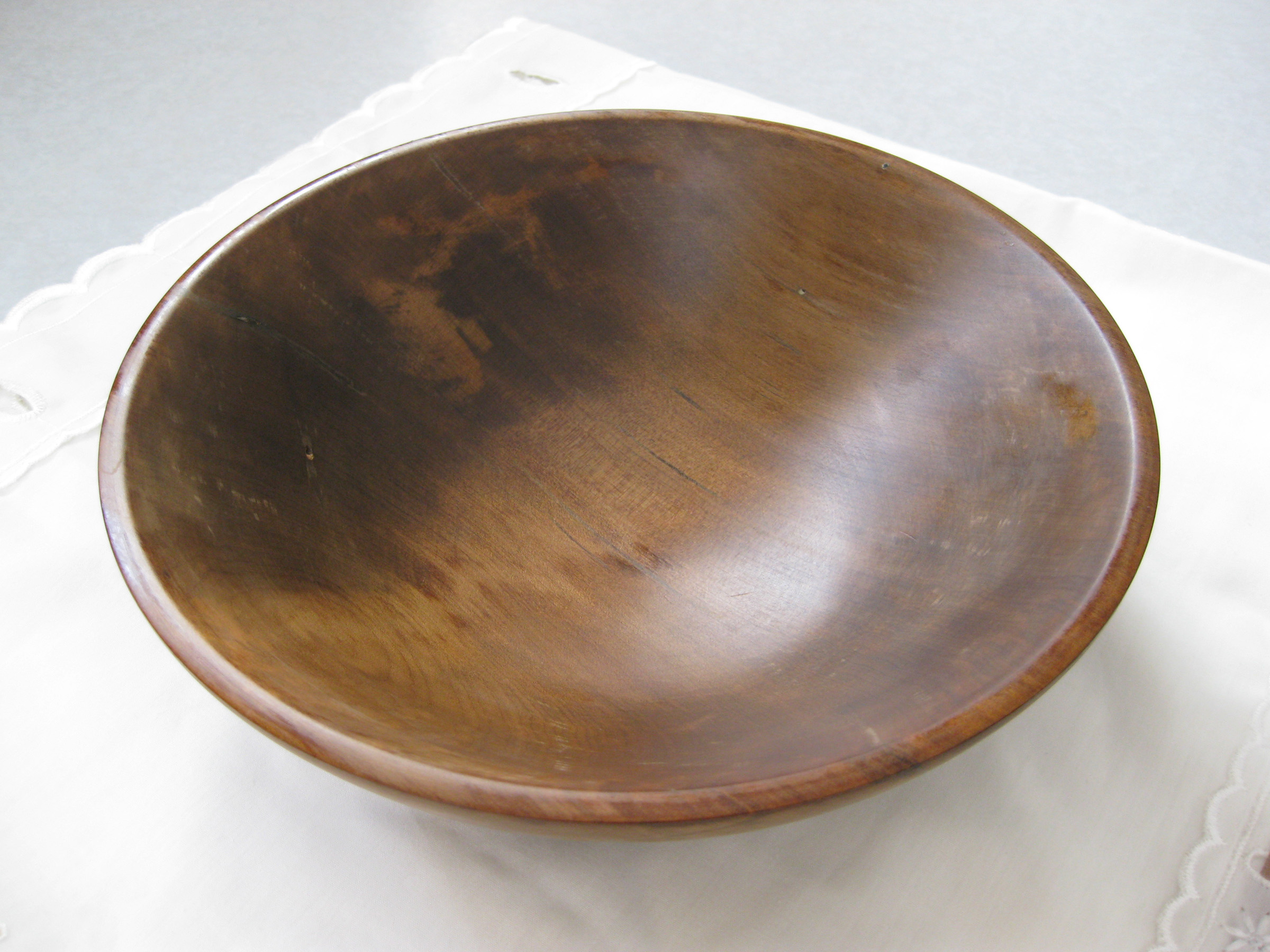
Wooden bowl made of swamp kauri

Swamp kauri, sometimes marketed as "ancient kauri", are prehistoric kauri trees (Agathis australis), buried and preserved in peat up to 50,000 years ago in New Zealand's North Island. Buried under a peat swamp by an unexplained act of nature at the end of the last Ice Age, the trees have survived the centuries underground, sealed in a chemically balanced environment that has preserved the timber in almost perfect condition.

The trees grew for nearly 2000 years before they were buried. Some have a girth of around 40 feet, and a total height of nearly 200 feet.

Only the lower trunk section and ball-root structure is predominantly found. The trunk tends to taper to a "V" shape as the portion of the log lying above ground has decayed to ground level. Some logs are on a 20-degree angle into the ground suggesting they have fallen over with force, probably under a larger tree that has fallen on top. For this reason complete round logs lying deeper in the ground are occasionally found.

Extraction of the logs is time consuming, expensive and technically difficult, requiring skilled operators of heavy machinery working in wet conditions. Each log must be carefully brought to the surface. If the log is salvaged from native forest or wetlands then after the log has been removed, the area is then restored to its original contours.

The extracted kauri has become an alternative source for old-growth wood supply and often finds its way to furniture builders, boat makers, and wood artisans.

A trademark of swamp kauri is deep, shimmering streaks of iridescence, called "white bait", found in some of the wilder grain patterns. This particular grain is named after schools of New Zealand whitebait fish that emit a similar pattern when swimming in one direction.
