= Mercury Plaza =

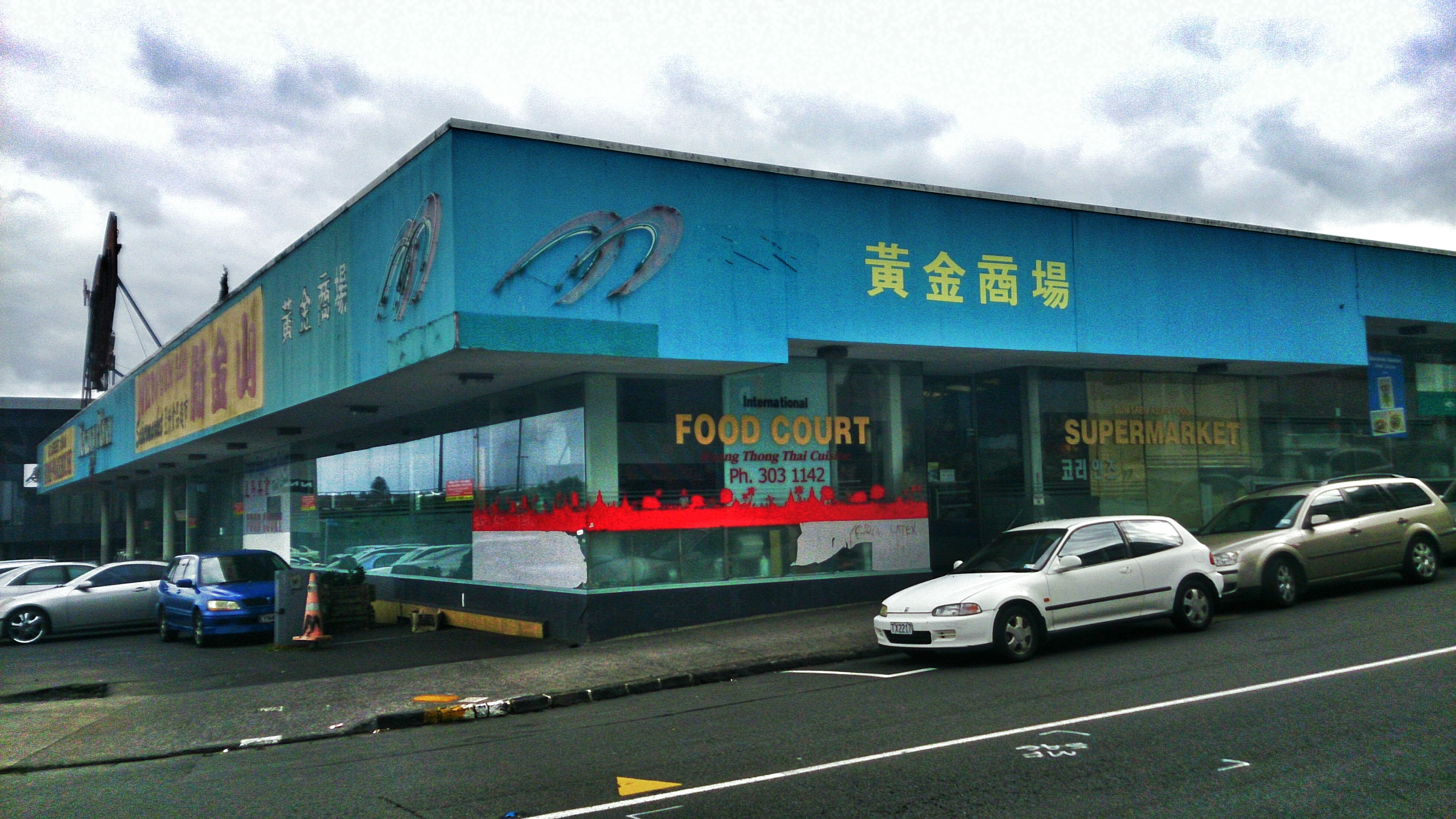
- Coordinates: 36.859°S 174.7591°E
- Address: (Formerly) 23–31 Mercury Ln, Auckland CBD, Auckland.
- Opened: 1994
- Closed: 2019

Mercury Plaza was a shopping centre and food court in Auckland located on Mercury Lane, near Karangahape Road. Opening in 1994, Mercury Plaza was Auckland's second Asian food court, after Food Alley which opened in 1992. In 2019 it was demolished to make way for Karangahape Station as part of the City Rail Link.

== Food-court ==
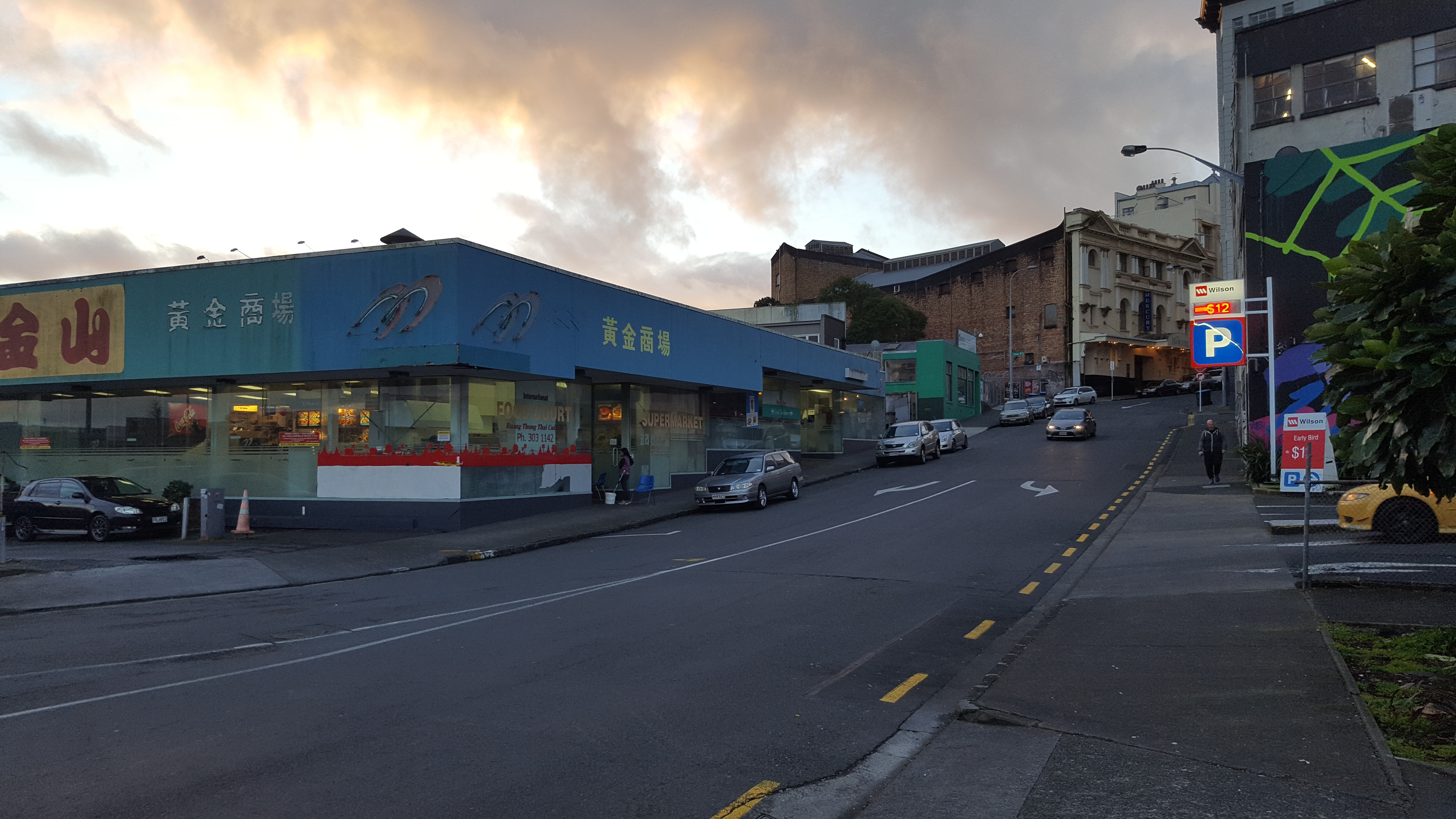
Mercury Plaza, a former shopping centre and international food court on Mercury Lane, near Karangahape Road, Auckland, New Zealand

Mercury Plaza served as a food-court from 1994 until its official closure on 31 October 2019. During this time it also housed arcades games, an Asian supermarket and a hairdresser. It was well known for its authentic Asian cuisine including Chinese, Thai, Vietnamese, Malaysian, Japanese and Korean cuisine. In 2016, it was announced that the building would be removed due to construction plans for the new Karangahape Station as part of the City Rail Link. Over 2,500 people signed a petition to save Mercury Plaza, however in 2019, the building was demolished.

Businesses such as Sushi Bar Salmon, Chinese Cuisine, Maruten Ramen, E-Sarn Wok, Ruang Thong, New Gum Sarn relocated to various places around Auckland upon the buildings closure.

== Cultural significance ==
Mercury Plaza had significant ties with Auckland's Chinese community and was dubbed an Auckland landmark.

In 2019, the building was revitalised through an exhibition titled, Mercury Plaza: Origins + New Beginnings. Curated by artists Joni Lee and Jia Luo, the exhibition brought together 14 Asian-New Zealand artists; Ant Sang, Ross Liew, Tim Lambourne, Ruby White, Lindsay Yee, Jia Luo, Pon Huey Min, Ruth Woodbury, Norman Wei, Mona Muchao Cui, Frankie Chu, Lisa Li, Qian-Ye Lin and Diana Hu. The exhibition reflected on their experiences exploring themes of culture, food, migration and diasporic experiences. It ran from 14 August to 14 September 2019.

In 2020 a photographic book, Mercury Plaza, was published by Tim D.

The neon star, part of the original Mercury Plaza sign, is in the collection at Auckland Museum.

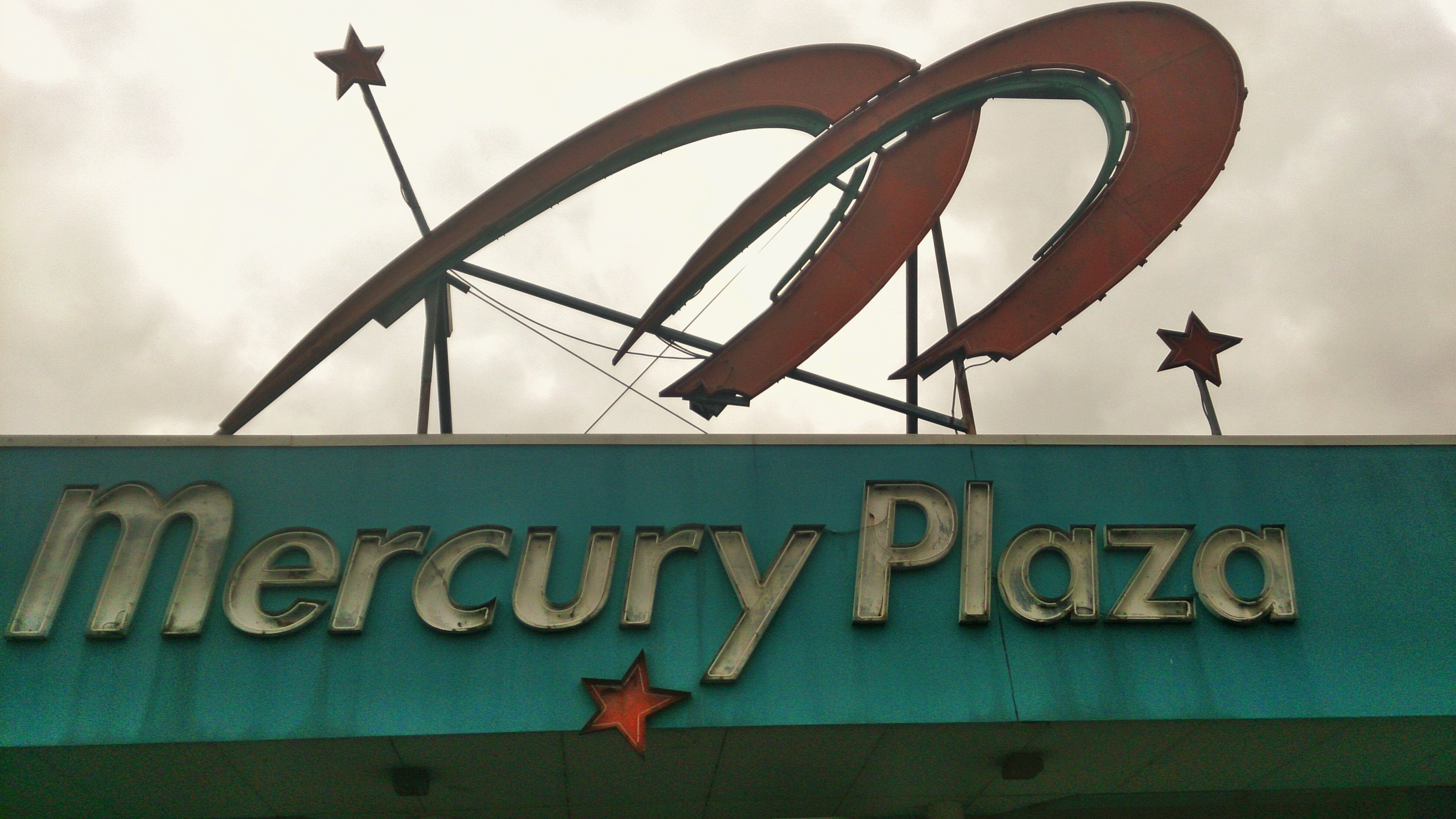
Signage at Mercury Plaza
