= Te Waihorotiu railway station =

Train station in Auckland, New Zealand

Te Waihorotiu
- The main Wellesley Street entrance, 2026

General information
- Location: Albert Street, Auckland CBD; New Zealand
- Coordinates: 36°50′58″S 174°45′47″E
- System: Auckland Transport urban rail
- Owner: Auckland Transport
- Operator: Auckland One Rail
- Line: North Island Main Trunk
- Distance: 682.70 km (424.21 mi) from Wellington
- Platforms: Island platform (P1 & P2)
- Tracks: 2
- Bus routes: 8

Construction
- Structure type: Underground
- Depth: 15 m (49 ft)
- Cycle facilities: Yes
- Accessible: Yes

Other information
- Station code: AOT
- Fare zone: City
- Website: Auckland Transport

History
- Opened: 13 September 2026

Services
Preceding station	Auckland Transport (Auckland One Rail)	Following station
Karanga-a-Hape towards Swanson	East West Line	Waitematā towards Manukau
Karanga-a-Hape towards Pukekohe	South City Line	Waitematā towards Newmarket
Route map
- Bold stations are City Rail Link stations
Location

Te Waihorotiu railway station is an underground station on the Auckland railway network, located in Auckland, New Zealand. It is situated on the North Island Main Trunk and is served by the East West (E-W) and South City (S-C) lines as part of the City Rail Link (CRL) project.

Planning for Te Waihorotiu dates back to 2010, when early plans for the CRL were first drawn up. Construction of the station did not officially commence until 2020. Numerous construction milestones were achieved throughout 2022 and 2023, including the connection of the station to the tunnels on both ends and to all three of its entrances. By 2025, construction of the station was largely complete, and it opened to the public on 13 September 2026.

In early plans, Te Waihorotiu station was referred to as Aotea station. This was the case until 2023, when the New Zealand Geographic Board (NZGB) assigned Te Waihorotiu as the official name of the railway station. The name was gifted by the CRL Mana Whenua Forum and refers to the Waihorotiu Stream, which is now covered and flows beneath Queen Street.

== Location ==
Te Waihorotiu station is 15 metres (49 ft) underground and is located beneath Albert Street. The station has three entrances: two on Victoria Street West and one on Wellesley Street. The Wellesley Street entrance is the main station building, which contains a customer service centre. The Wellesley Street entrance also contains lifts, escalators, and stairs to the concourse level. In addition, the Wellesley Street building houses back-of-house systems such as electrical, communication, fire safety, heating, and ventilation. The Wellesley Street entrance also includes bathrooms and changing facilities. The western entrance on Victoria Street West contains escalators and a lift to the concourse level, while the eastern entrance provides direct access to the concourse level. On the concourse level, lifts and escalators provide access to the platforms. The station also has bike parking located outside the entrances.

Due to it being located in the heart of the city, Auckland Transport expects Te Waihorotiu to become New Zealand's busiest train station. It serves areas such as: Auckland's art quarter (including Aotea Centre, Auckland Town Hall, and Civic Theatre); Auckland's learning quarter (including AUT and University of Auckland); entertainment areas such as SkyCity; and shopping areas on Queen Street.

Victoria Street West entrances in foreground and background.

=== The Symphony Centre ===
Throughout 2024 and 2025, plans were announced for a new 21-storey mixed-use building to be constructed above the Wellesley Street entrance. This mixed-use building will be called The Symphony Centre and is set for completion in late 2028. The development will also see the refurbishment of the heritage building, Bledisloe House and the formation of new public laneways. The Symphony Centre will be New Zealand's first transit-oriented development and is part of a wider Midtown regeneration project.

== History ==
=== Early plans ===
Early plans for Te Waihorotiu station (formerly referred to as Aotea station) emerged in 2010 when the Auckland Regional Transport Authority (ARTA) and KiwiRail selected a preferred route with three stations: "Aotea" (beneath Albert Street), "K Road" (beneath Pitt Street and adjacent to Karangahape Road) and "Newton" (beneath upper Symonds Street), at an estimated cost range of $1 billion to $1.5 billion. The Newton station was later dropped, in favour of a redeveloped Mount Eden station and a fully grade-separated junction with the North Auckland Line.

As originally planned by Auckland Council and Auckland Transport, the CRL's underground rail lines would reach their capacity of 36,000 passengers per hour in 2045. In July 2018, City Rail Link Ltd (CRLL) published revised projections which showed that the 36,000 passenger capacity would be reached sooner in 2035 and that the new maximum capacity would be 54,000 passengers per hour. The current trains are capable of having extra cars added in groups of three. Te Waihorotiu, as originally planned, would not have been long enough to accommodate trains longer than six cars. Due to these new projections, it was decided that the station's platforms were to be made longer in case the need for nine-car trains arose in the future. The extra cost was estimated to run into the "low hundreds of millions" and would prevent a costly future two-year closure if the platform lengthening retrofitting work was carried out after the CRL was opened.

=== Construction ===
Looking down onto platform level from concourse

South City train leaving Platform 2

In July 2020, construction of the station began, with the commencement being marked by then-minister of transport, Phil Twyford, and then-mayor of Auckland, Phil Goff. In December 2021, two breakthrough milestones were achieved, with the tunnels from Albert Street and the first tunnel from Mount Eden now being exposed. The tunnel from Mount Eden was broken through by the tunnel boring machine Dame Whina Cooper (named after Māori rights activist Whina Cooper). In September 2022, the Dame Whina Cooper tunnel boring machine broke through the station construction site for the second time, meaning the station was now connected to two tunnels at the southern end of the station, heading towards Karanga-a-Hape. In November 2022, all three entrances were now connected to the station.

In September 2023, the structural phase, which included concreting, steel works, and tunnelling, was completed. Also in September 2023, lifts and escalators began to be installed in the station. In February 2024, the installation of train tracks was fully completed. In early 2025, AT HOP ticketing gates were installed at the station entrances. In February 2025, the first CRL test train passed through the station.

Throughout 2025, the station was largely complete, with finishing touches such as lighting, wayfinding, and streetscaping works taking place. Upon official completion of construction, the station was handed over to Auckland Transport, who own the station.

=== Station name ===
In May 2022, the station was gifted the name "Te Wai Horotiu" by the CRL Mana Whenua Forum. The name refers to the now-covered Waihorotiu Stream which flows beneath Queen Street.

Together with Auckland Transport, CRLL submitted this suggested name to the NZGB for recognition. In August 2022, the Board altered the suggested name, "Te Wai Horotiu", to "Te Waihorotiu" to align with Māori language orthographic standards. The name was then sent for public consultation.

In March 2023, the NZGB announced that the name "Te Waihorotiu" was accepted and thus became the official name for the railway station.

=== Wellesley Street bus improvements ===
It is expected that, with the opening of Te Waihorotiu station, Wellesley Street will become a major transport hub as it will connect buses and trains. With Auckland Transport expecting thousands of people to use the station everyday, Wellesley Street was upgraded in order to prioritise public transport and pedestrians. Beginning in October 2021, the project saw the addition of new bus shelters, street furniture, and street lights. It also included widening footpaths to allow for ease of movement and increased foot traffic. These improvements are intended to allow for more reliable bus services and better pedestrian connectivity between Te Waihorotiu and surrounding areas. The Wellesley Street bus improvements project was completed and opened to the public on 19 April 2026.

== Station design and layout ==
Horotiu main entrance artwork

The station incorporates Māori culture and narratives into the overall design. On the Wellesley Street entrance building, a façade formed of aluminium fins in a poutama pattern represents the "sky element" of the building. The sky element pays tribute to Ranginui, the Sky Father. Inside the station building, above the ticketing area, is the "threshold element" of hundreds of rods connected to the ceiling resembling raupō (bullrushes) surrounding a carving of Horotiu, the guardian of the Waihorotiu Stream. The glazed canopy, located on the outside of the building, represents "te whaiao" or "the daylight or glimmer of dawn". This was inspired by the Māori god, Tāne, pushing apart his parents. The concrete panels on the exterior of the station represents the "earth element" and pays tribute to Papatūānuku, the Earth Mother.

Inside the station, seven skylights represent the Matariki constellation. The entire station is in the shape of a waka and the four cross-beams inside the station represent the binding together of people to the land. At the platform level, motifs designed by mana whenua artist Graham Tipene (Ngāti Whātua, Ngāti Kahu, Ngāti Hine, Ngāti Hauā, Ngāti Manu) represent the Waihorotiu stream and the movement of water. Tipene also created the threshold element with carver Paraone Luiten-Apirana (Ngāti Hikairo, Ngāi Tūhoe, Te Arawa).

The station is located on the North Island Main Trunk and has an island platform layout with two platforms. Platform 1 is the northbound platform heading towards Waitematā and Platform 2 is the southbound platform heading towards Karanga-a-Hape.

== Services ==
Te Waihorotiu is located in the City fare zone.

Te Waihorotiu station is served by South City line (S-C) trains heading to Newmarket and Pukekohe, as well as East West line (E-W) trains heading to Swanson and Manukau. These services, like the others operating on the Auckland rail network, are operated by Auckland One Rail.

== Artwork ==
Wāhine, a sculpture by Arekatera Maihi and Beronia Scott outside the station

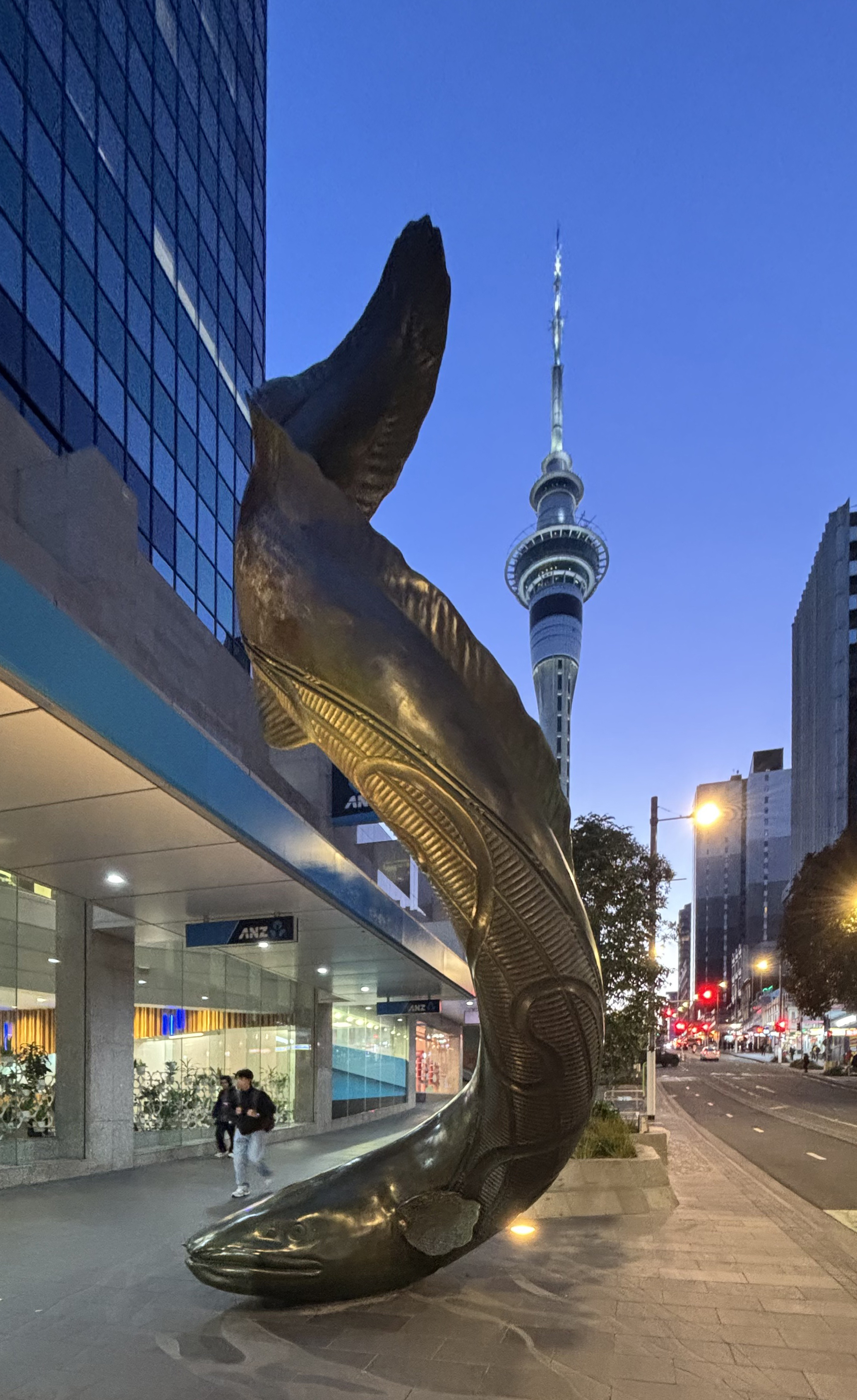
Horotiu, a sculpture by Chris Bailey and Sally Smith near the station

Outside the station, there are two public artworks (known as taonga toi). Wāhine is a 3.7-metre tall (12 ft) bronze sculpture of a Māori woman performing a karanga (call of welcome). Horotiu is a silicone bronze sculpture, 7.2 metres (24 ft) tall, depicting a longfin eel.
