= Grafton railway station, Auckland =

Train station in New Zealand

Grafton
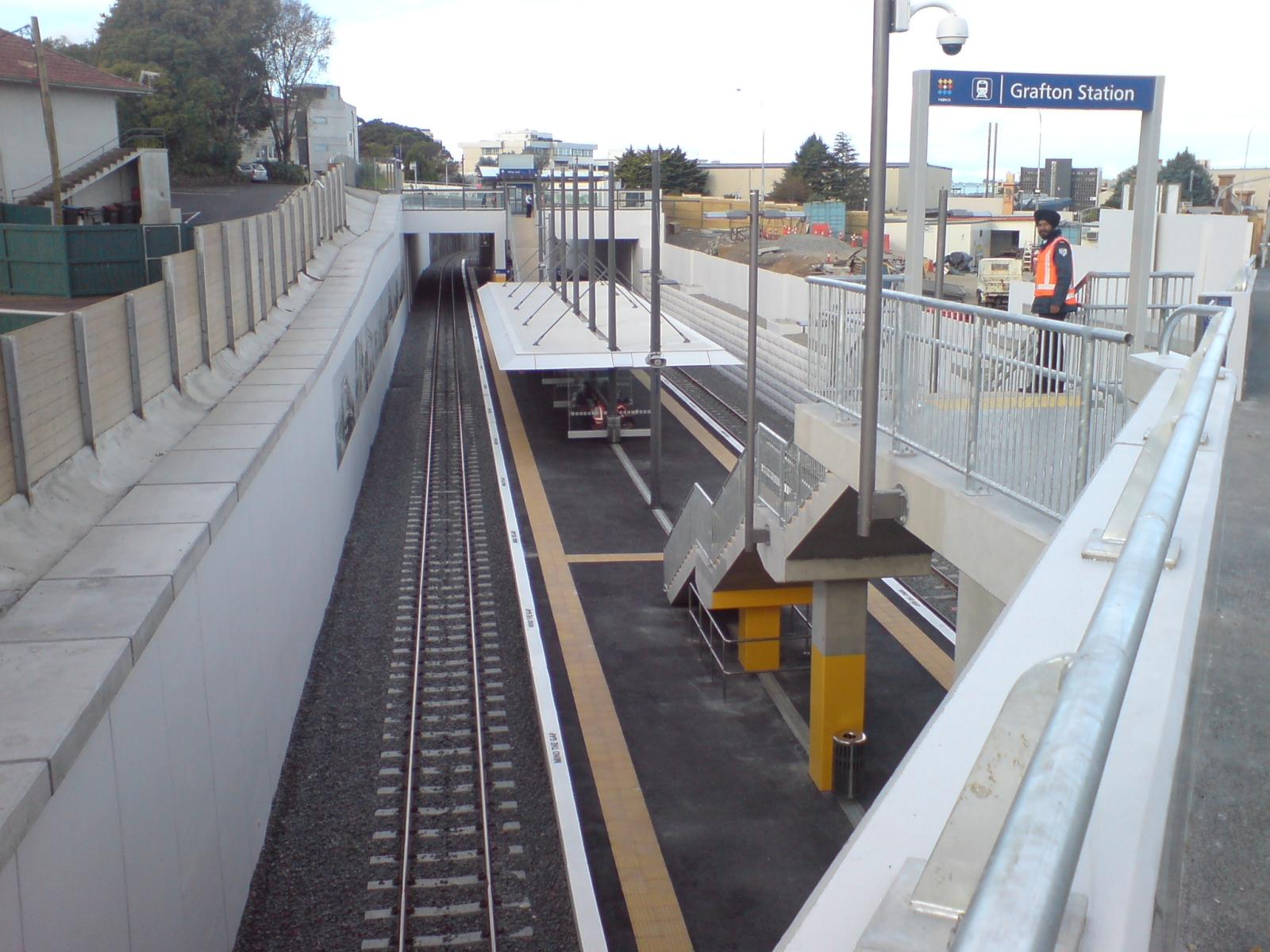
- Grafton Station from Khyber Pass Rd towards Park Rd, 2010

General information
- Location: Grafton, Auckland; New Zealand
- Coordinates: 36.8655°S 174.7701°E
- System: Auckland Transport Urban rail
- Owner: KiwiRail (track and platforms); Auckland Transport (buildings)
- Operator: Auckland One Rail
- Line: North Auckland Line
- Distance: 9.50 km (5.90 mi) from Westfield Junction
- Platforms: Island platform (P1 & P2)
- Tracks: Mainline (2)

Construction
- Parking: No
- Cycle facilities: Cycle racks on Park Road
- Accessible: Yes (Lifts)

Other information
- Fare zone: City

History
- Opened: 11 April 2010
- Rebuilt: 2009–2010

Services
| Preceding station | Auckland Transport (Auckland One Rail) | Following station |
|---|---|---|
| Maungawhau towards Henderson | Onehunga West Line | Newmarket towards Onehunga |
| Newmarket towards Pukekohe | South City Line | Karanga-a-Hape towards Newmarket |
Former services
| Preceding station | Auckland Transport (Auckland One Rail) | Following station |
|---|---|---|
| Newmarket towards Waitematā | Western Line pre-2026 | Kingsland (Maungawhau pre-2020) towards Swanson |
Location

Grafton railway station is a station serving the inner-city suburb of Grafton in Auckland, New Zealand. It is located on the South City line and Onehunga West line of Auckland's passenger rail network and consists of an island platform located in a trench near the intersection of Khyber Pass Road and Park Road. The station opened on 11 April 2010.

== Connectivity and layout ==
The station serves as a direct interchange with a large number of bus routes, including the InnerLink and buses travelling along the Central Connector, and is located in close proximity to Auckland Hospital, Auckland Domain and the University of Auckland's Grafton and Newmarket campuses.

The station has four entrances, as its platform extends under both Khyber Pass Road and Park Road, with stairs connecting the station to both sides of each road. Both of the Park Road stairs connect directly to bus stops. There is also a lift on the western side of Park Road. The entrance on the southern side of Khyber Pass Road is adjacent to St Peter's College and students have direct access to the platform without having to cross any roads. Up to a third of the school's students use Grafton station in the mornings and afternoons on school days.

== Services ==
Auckland One Rail, on behalf of Auckland Transport, operates South City Line and Onehunga West Line services.

== Future ==
When the City Rail Link opens in 2026, rail services at Grafton Station will change significantly. The Western Line will no longer serve the station, as it will be rerouted through the new tunnels between Maungawhau and Waitematā as the East West Line. Instead, the Southern Line, as the South City Line, will be rerouted through Grafton on its way between Newmarket and the City Centre, and the Onehunga Line will also be rerouted to serve the station as the Onehunga West Line. Its route will be extended to Maungawhau from Newmarket to Onehunga.

== History ==
Grafton Station replaced Boston Road station, and is located approximately 300m north-east of the site of the former station. The station was re-sited at a cost of $3 million to make it closer to major destinations such as the hospital and to allow more direct interchange to bus routes than the previous site.

The new station had both the name Grafton and Khyber Pass proposed. The New Zealand Geographic Board decided on choosing the name Grafton Railway Station. The Grafton Residents' Association and Auckland City Council supported the chosen moniker.

The line through the station was electrified in 2014, and AM class EMUs replaced diesel powered trains on the Western Line in 2015.

== See also ==
- List of Auckland railway stations
- Public transport in Auckland
