= K station =

K station may refer to:

- Karangahape railway station, in Auckland CBD, New Zealand
- Radio stations in the western portion of the United States typically begin with 'K'; see call signs in the United States#Geographical separation of K and W call signs
