= Midtown station =

Midtown station may refer to:

- Midtown station (MARTA)
- Midtown station (Oklahoma City Streetcar)
- Midtown railway station, also known as the Te Waihorotiu railway station, located in Auckland CBD
