= Horotiu (sculpture) =

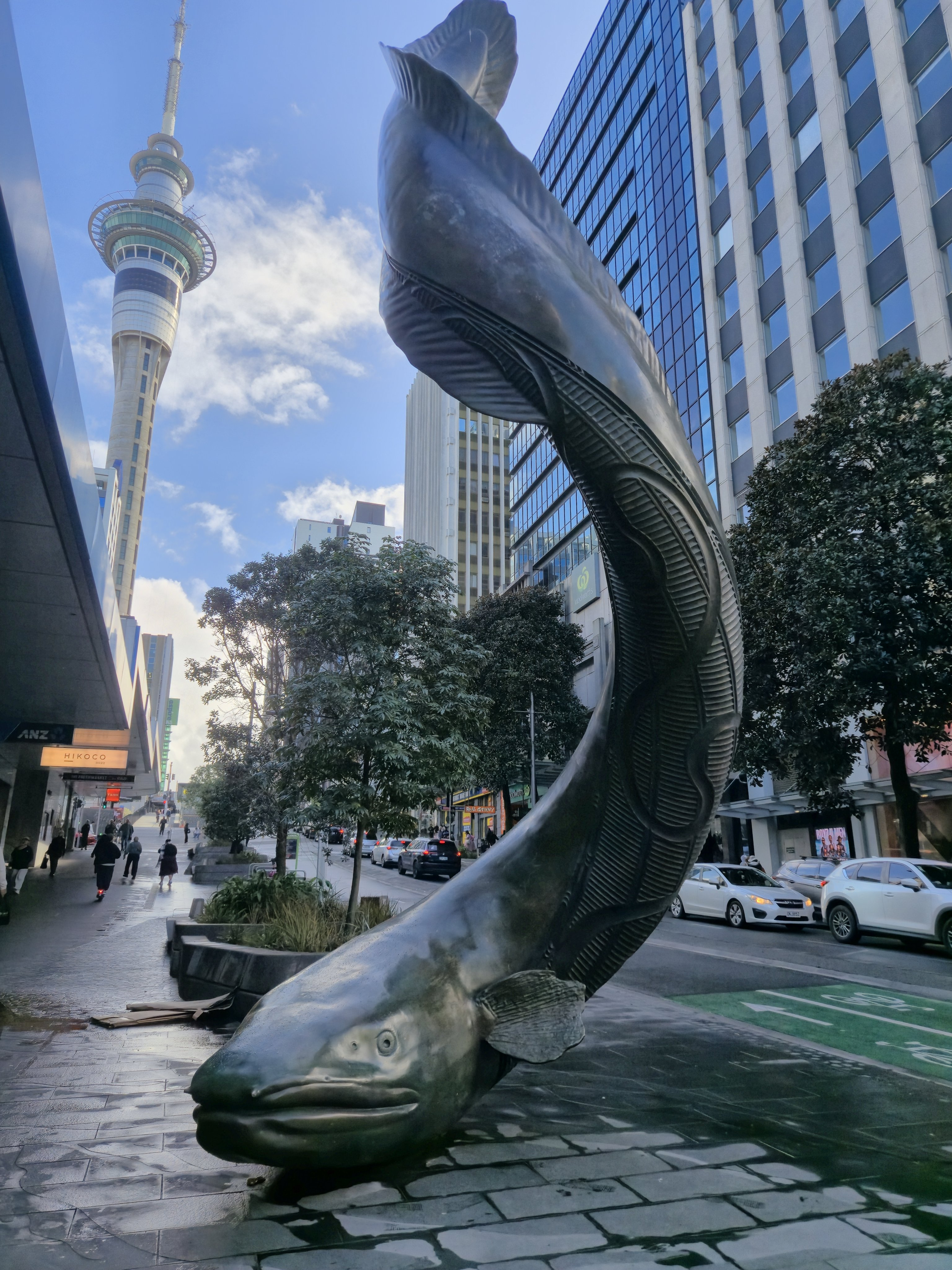
- Interactive map of Horotiu
- Location: Auckland City Center, New Zealand
- Coordinates: 36°50′56″S 174°45′55″E
- Designer: Chris Bailey and Sally Smith
- Material: Bronze
- Opening date: 2026

Horotiu is a bronze sculpture located on the corner of Queen Street and Victoria Street West in Auckland, New Zealand created by Chris Bailey and Sally Smith. It depicts a 7.2 metre long spiraling tuna kūwharuwhara (New Zealand longfin eel). It was unveiled on 29 July 2026.

The sculpture was inspired by the Waihorotiu Stream which used to form a wetland in the area but now runs in pipes under Queen Street. The Auckland Council contributed $632,000 towards the cost of the sculpture.
