= Boston Road railway station =

Defunct train station in New Zealand

Boston Road
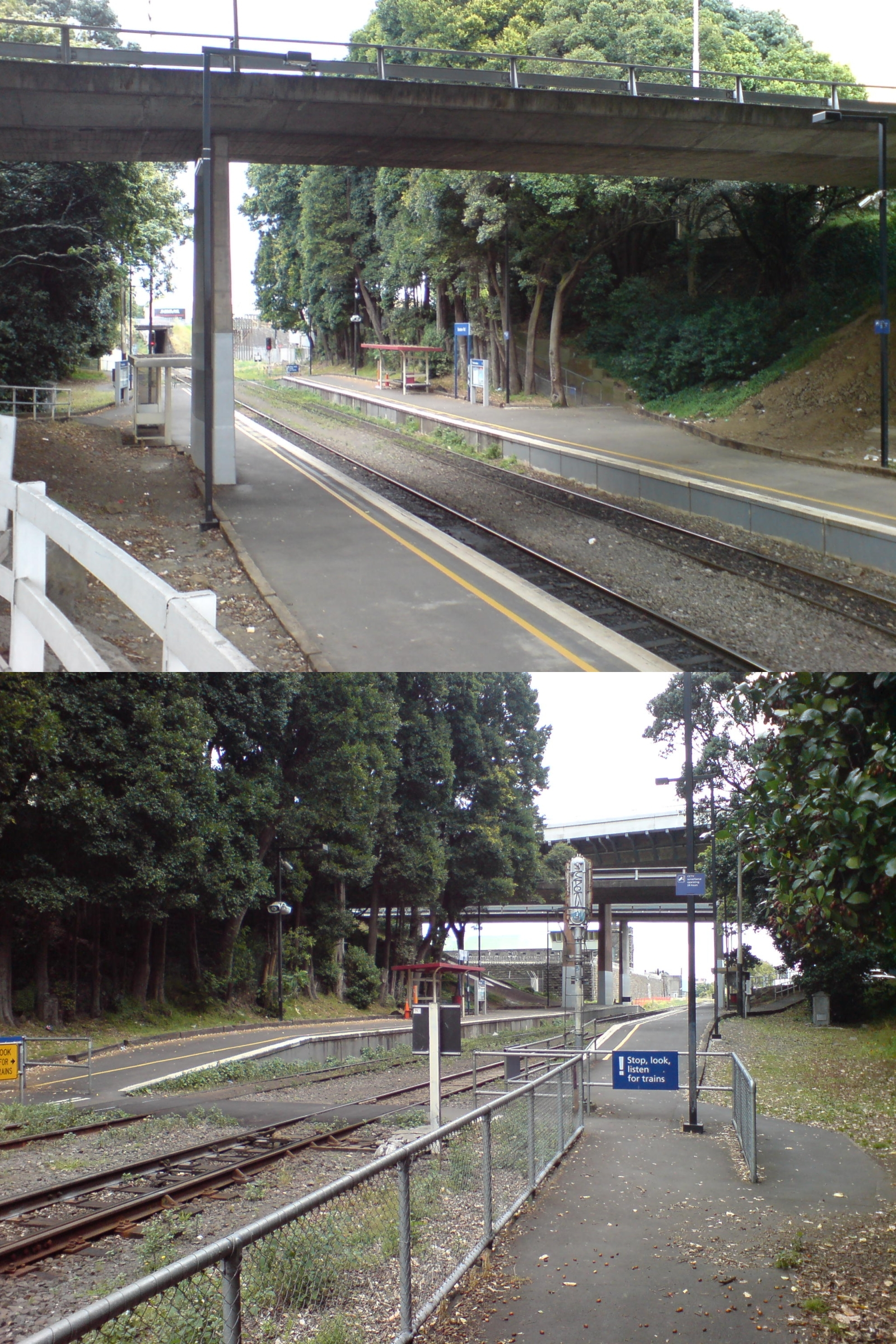
- The station in 2007. Above: looking east. Below: looking west.

General information
- Location: Auckland
- Tracks: Mainline (2)

Construction
- Parking: No
- Cycle facilities: No

History
- Opened: 15 September 1964
- Closed: 10 April 2010
- Rebuilt: 1993
Location

Boston Road railway station was a station on the Western Line of the Auckland rail network, near St Peter's College and Auckland Grammar School. It was beneath an overbridge of State Highway 1, one of the busiest motorways in New Zealand. At the southern end of the station is the north western wall of Mt Eden Prison.

Until double-tracking between the station and Mt Eden in 2005, eastbound morning trains ran on the westbound track through the loop, avoiding the need for the school pupils to cross the line. The station closed on 10 April 2010, the day after the opening of the new Grafton station, and has since been largely demolished.

== History ==
The line played an important part in the history of St Peter's College. From the time the school opened in 1939 many students came from the western suburbs of Auckland using the train service (known at that time at St Peter's College as the "North train") to attend the school. Until 1964 the nearest station was Mt Eden station, a ten-minute walk to or from the school. By 1964 about 250 St Peter's boys were using the train and walking between Mt Eden station and the school.

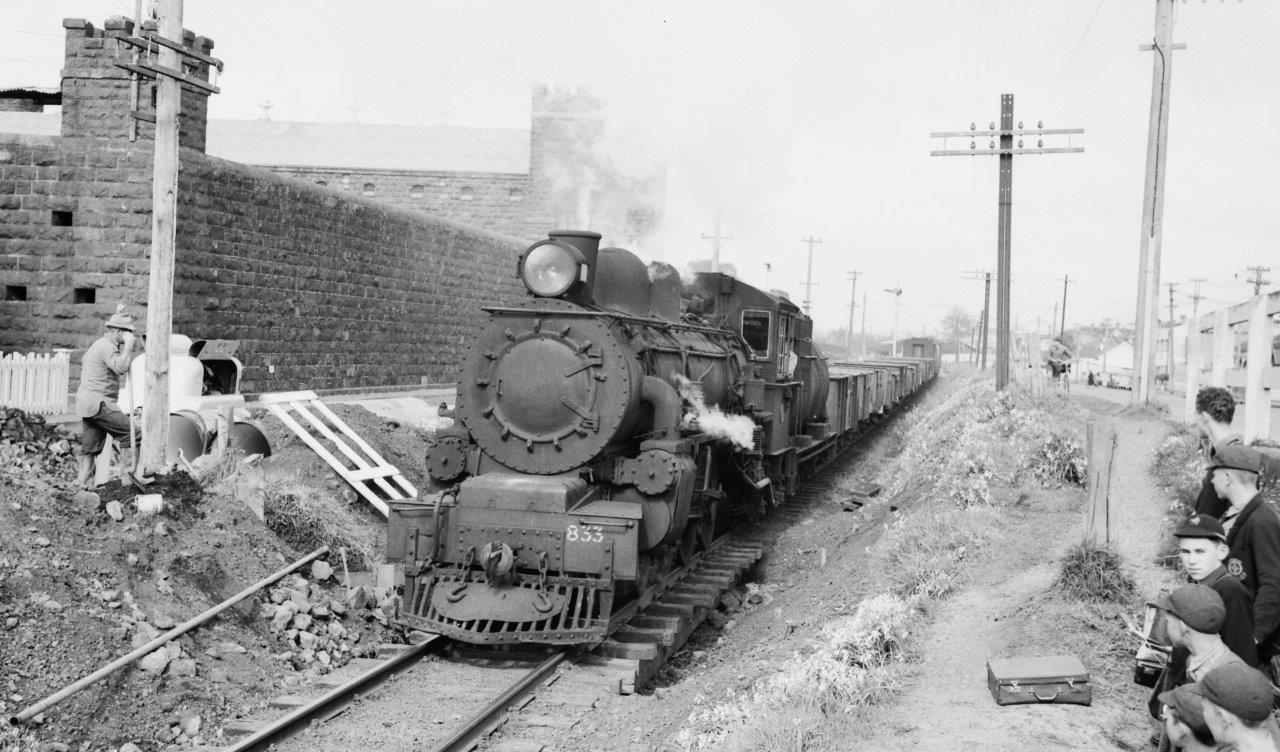
St Peter's College and Auckland Grammar School students wait to cross the western line from Boston Rd to their schools 17 October 1957; Mt Eden Prison in the background.

Brother T. A. Monagle, who supervised the train boys and who travelled on the train each day for that purpose, approached the Railways Department to request that the train stop at the school. The college had several reasons for asking that the trains should stop there. "The traffic in Mt Eden Road had become very heavy, and was a constant danger to the younger and more thoughtless of our pupils, and another source of considerable danger existed at Mt Eden station where supervision was necessary to prevent accidents when the boys were boarding the train. Again, the train would disgorge its pupils at Mt Eden and then chug merrily past the school almost empty, leaving the boys to walk half a mile, often in heavy rain." Brother Monagle persuaded the Minister of Railways, Mr John McAlpine, to come and see for himself. In fact the Minister volunteered to walk up to the Mt Eden station from the school. "Well, somebody must have been pulling some strings up above, because on the day of the Minister's visit it rained cats and dogs, and even the odd pink elephant ..." and Brother Monagle's request was granted. The North train stopped at the St Peter's College station for the first time at 8.30am on Tuesday 15 September 1964 for the 250 St Peter's College boys and a dozen from Auckland Grammar. Initially the station was just a metalled strip parallel to the tracks.

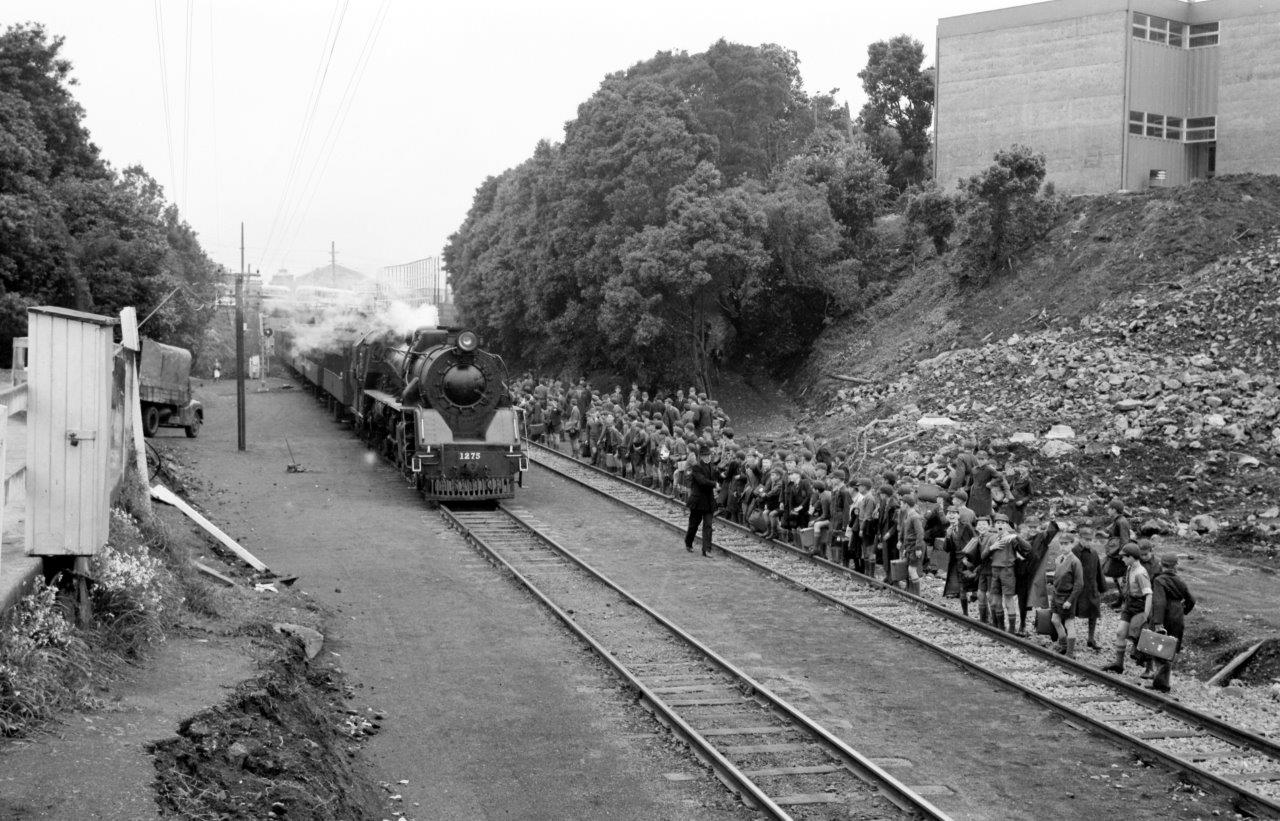
The school train at St Peter's College railway station 15 September 1964; Brother Monagle controlling the school boy throng.

Another noteworthy event occurred in November 1965, when, for the last time, the North train was pulled by a steam engine. It was the last passenger train in the North Island to be pulled by a steam locomotive.

In relation to Brother Monagle, " ... it is generally agreed that he deserved the rank of Railway Employee. Surely no single person has ever held down so many positions at once - stationmaster, signalman, ticket inspector and guard, not to mention construction engineer, traffic officer and the occasional shot at engine-driving! During the many years that he was associated with the train, Brother Monagle became friends with most of the railway employees along the line as he made his trip each afternoon as far as Mt Albert". Initially, only the "school" trains stopped at St Peter's College, once in the morning and once in the afternoon. The St Peter's College station attained full public station status with all trains stopping there from 1993 and was named the Boston Road Station.

== Station move and closure ==
In 2008 and 2009, ONTRACK reconstructed two road bridges just to the east of the station to allow double-tracking in the section towards Newmarket station and to prepare for electrification. From January 2009, the station premises were moved westwards to accommodate construction work, with platforms facing onto the wall of Mt Eden Prison. This would be the final form of the Boston Road station.

Subsequently, boardings and alightings were shifted several hundred metres to the northeast, between Park Road and Khyber Pass Road, where a new station and bus interchange was built. This station was named Grafton station. It is able to better serve the Central Connector and sites such as the Auckland Hospital and the university development on the former Lion Brewery site while still preserving direct access to their school for the hundreds of St Peter's College students who commute daily by train.

== See also ==
- List of Auckland railway stations
- Public transport in Auckland
