= Khyber Pass Road =

Street in central Auckland, New Zealand

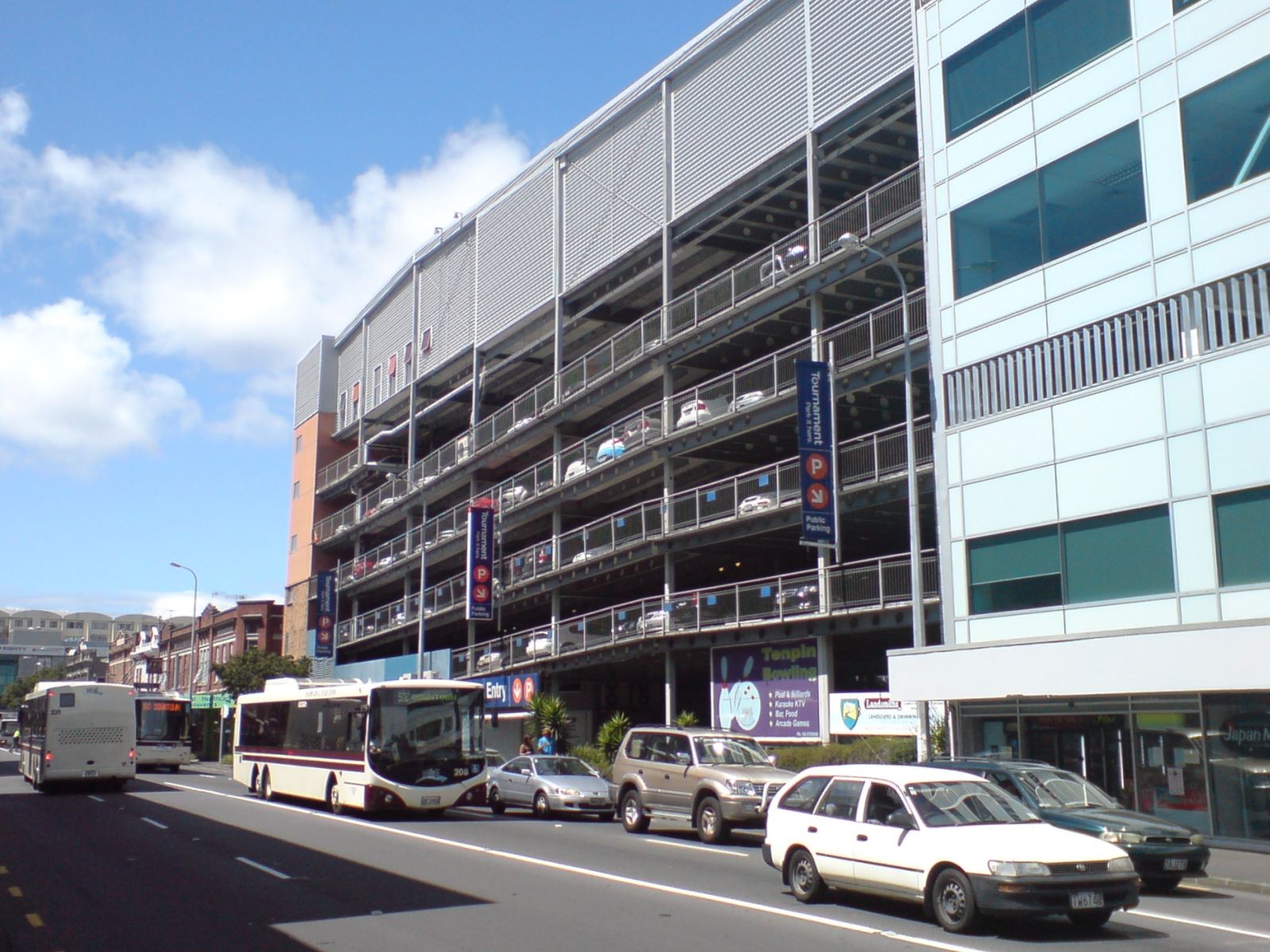
- Khyber Pass Road in 2010
- Length: 1.6 km (0.99 mi)
- Location: Newton, Grafton and Newmarket, New Zealand
- Postal code: 1023
- Coordinates: 36.8657°S 174.7695°E
- West end: Symonds Street
- East end: Broadway

Khyber Pass Road is a street in the Auckland City Centre, New Zealand, connecting Upper Symonds Street to Broadway in Newmarket. The road is intersected by both the Western Line and the Auckland Southern Motorway.

== History ==
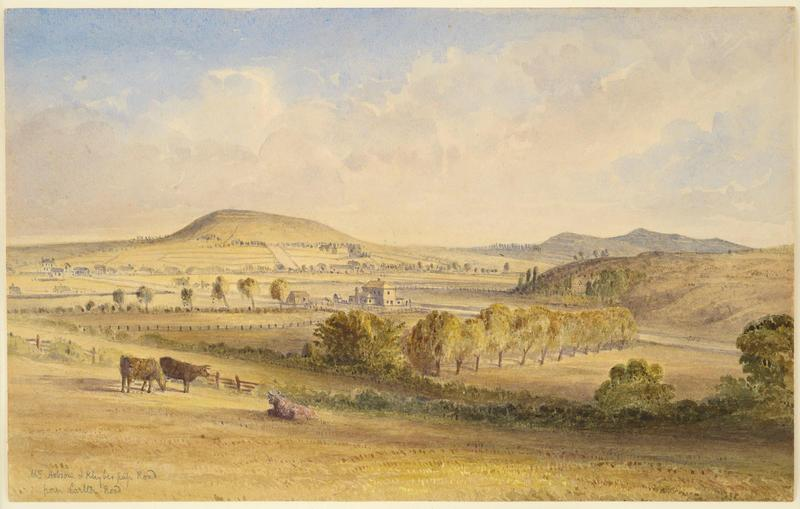
A watercolour by John Kinder showing Khyber Pass Road, looking south to Ōhinerau / Mount Hobson (circa 1850s)

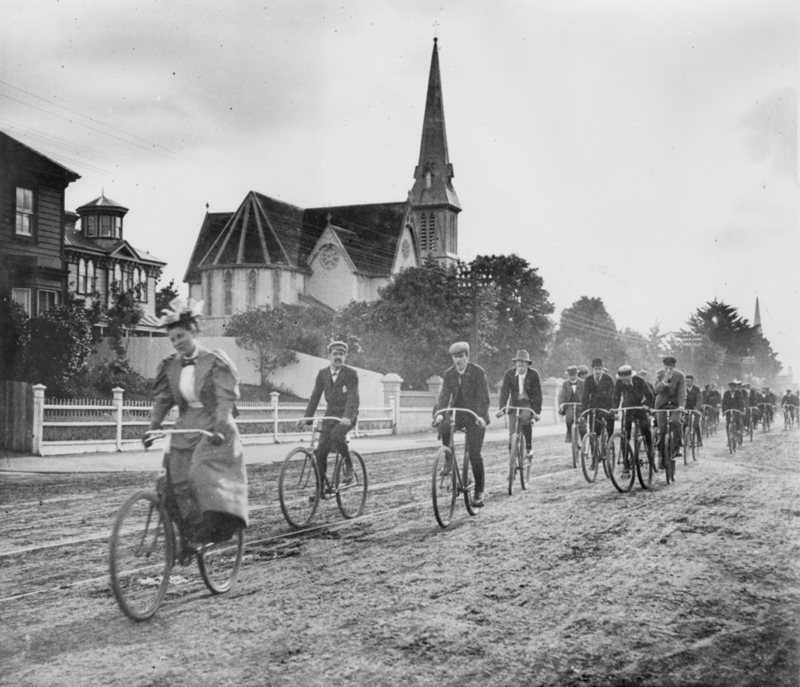
The bicycle club of the Church of the Holy Sepulchre riding on Khyber Pass Road in October 1896

Khyber Pass began life as a dirt track, during the early settlement of Auckland in the 1840s. As the road was seen as a dangerous frontier, it was named after the Khyber Pass in modern-day Pakistan, which at the time was glamorised as the frontier of British India. The road, along with Great South Road, was a part of the route used by soldiers travelling south during the Invasion of the Waikato in the 1860s. The spelling Kyber Pass was commonly used, up until the early 1940s.

The part of the road close to Newmarket was known as Hobson's Bridge, referring to an old wooden bridge that existed on modern-day Davis Crescent, which crossed Hobson's Creek, a former waterway. The road was the southern border of the township of Auckland in 1852, so that an ordinance stopping loose cattle could be applied to a larger area.

During the late 1850s and 1860s, the land adjacent to Khyber Pass was subdivided and sold as suburban housing, including sections such as the Kyber Pass Village and Kyber Pass Estate.

The area became a centre for brewers in the mid-19th century, due to the presence of a natural spring. The Captain Cook Inn opened by Thomas Hancock on the road in 1859. Originally brewing beer just for the tavern, by 1862 the brewery had become a commercial venture for Hancock. Richard Seccombe opened a brewery opposite the Inn in 1861 called the Great Northern Brewery, later known as Lion Brewery.

In 1872, the Auckland City Council purchased land on Khyber Pass, where water reservoirs and pumping stations were established.

The Captain Cook Inn was demolished in 1968. The last brewery site on the road was the Lion Brewery, which sold its premises in 2008, and was later redeveloped as a satellite campus of the University of Auckland.

== Notable locations ==
- Church of the Holy Sepulchre, an Anglican church built in 1881 to replace the church that was a part of the Anglican section of the Symonds Street Cemetery.
- Grafton railway station, a railway station on the Western Line opened in 2010, replacing the earlier Boston Road railway station to the southwest.
- Kāhui St David's community centre. Originally opened in 1927 as St David's Presbyterian Church, a combined church and World War I memorial, the church was closed in 2020, and reopened in late 2023 as the Kāhui St David's community centre.
- St Peter's College, a Catholic boys' secondary school opened in 1939.
- The University of Auckland Newmarket Campus is an engineering and science campus in the former Lion Brewery site.

== Gallery ==
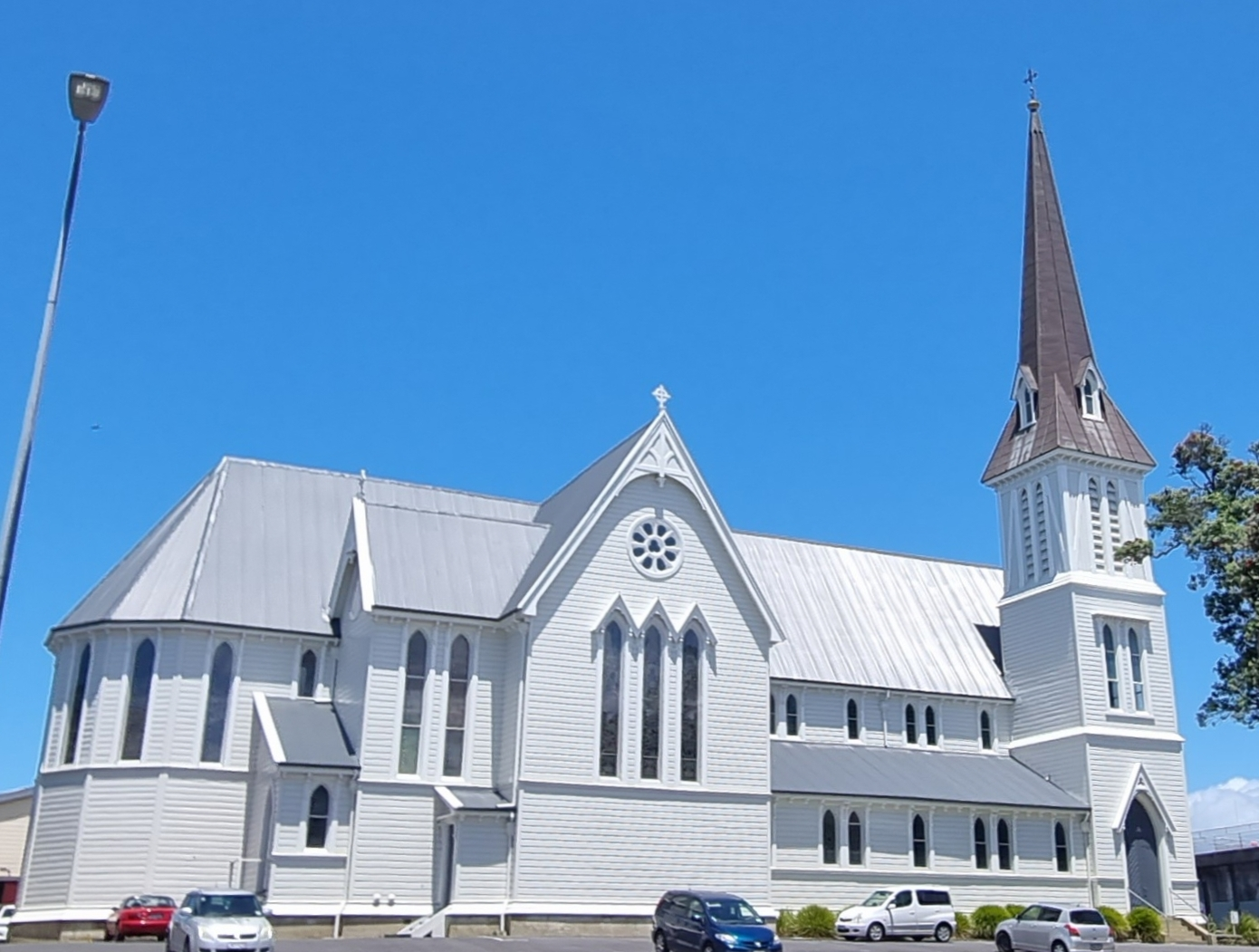
Church of the Holy Sepulchre

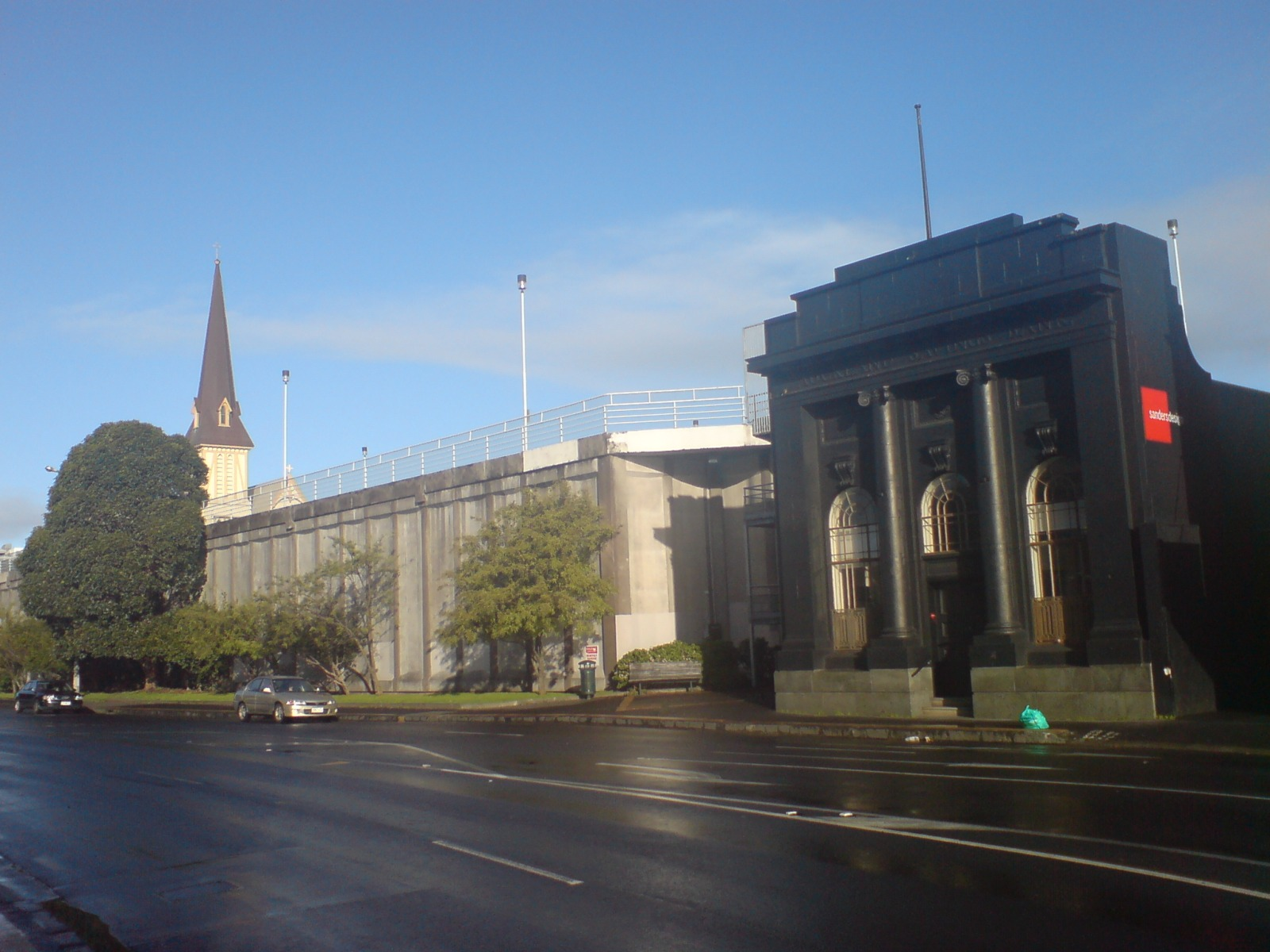
The Khyber Reservoir

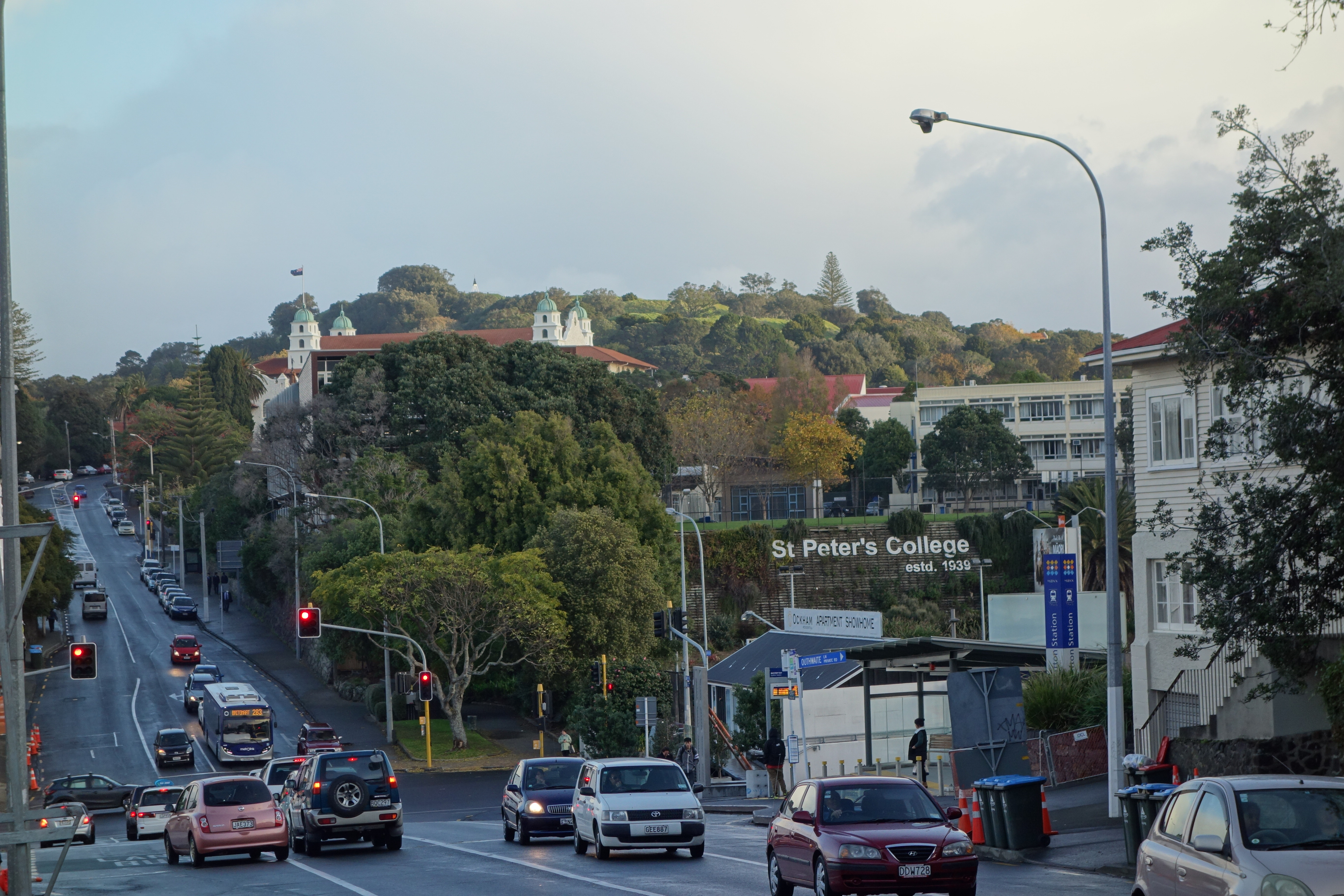
St Peter's College, looking south along Mountain Road across the Khyber Pass Road intersection.

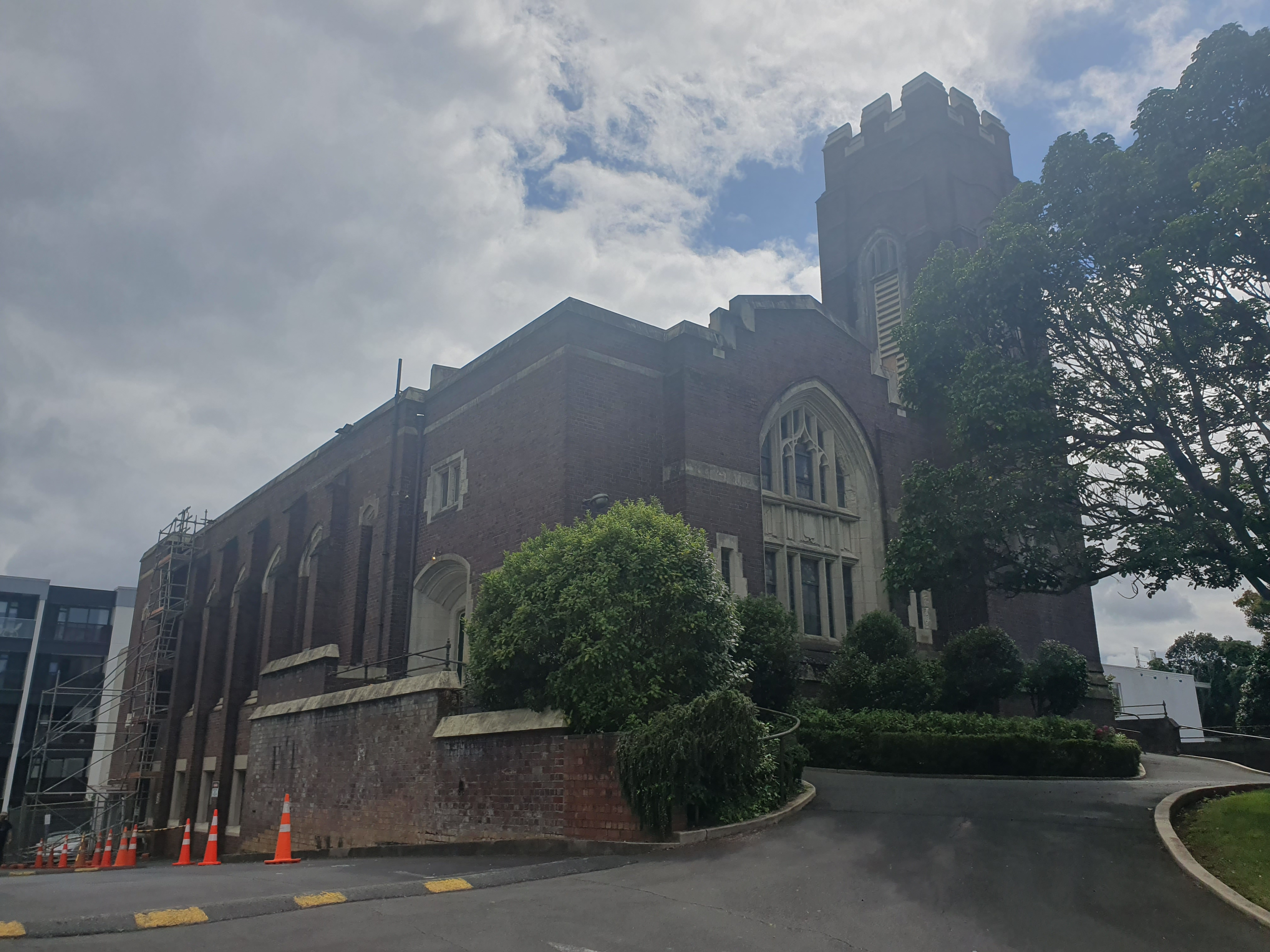
St David's Presbyterian Church

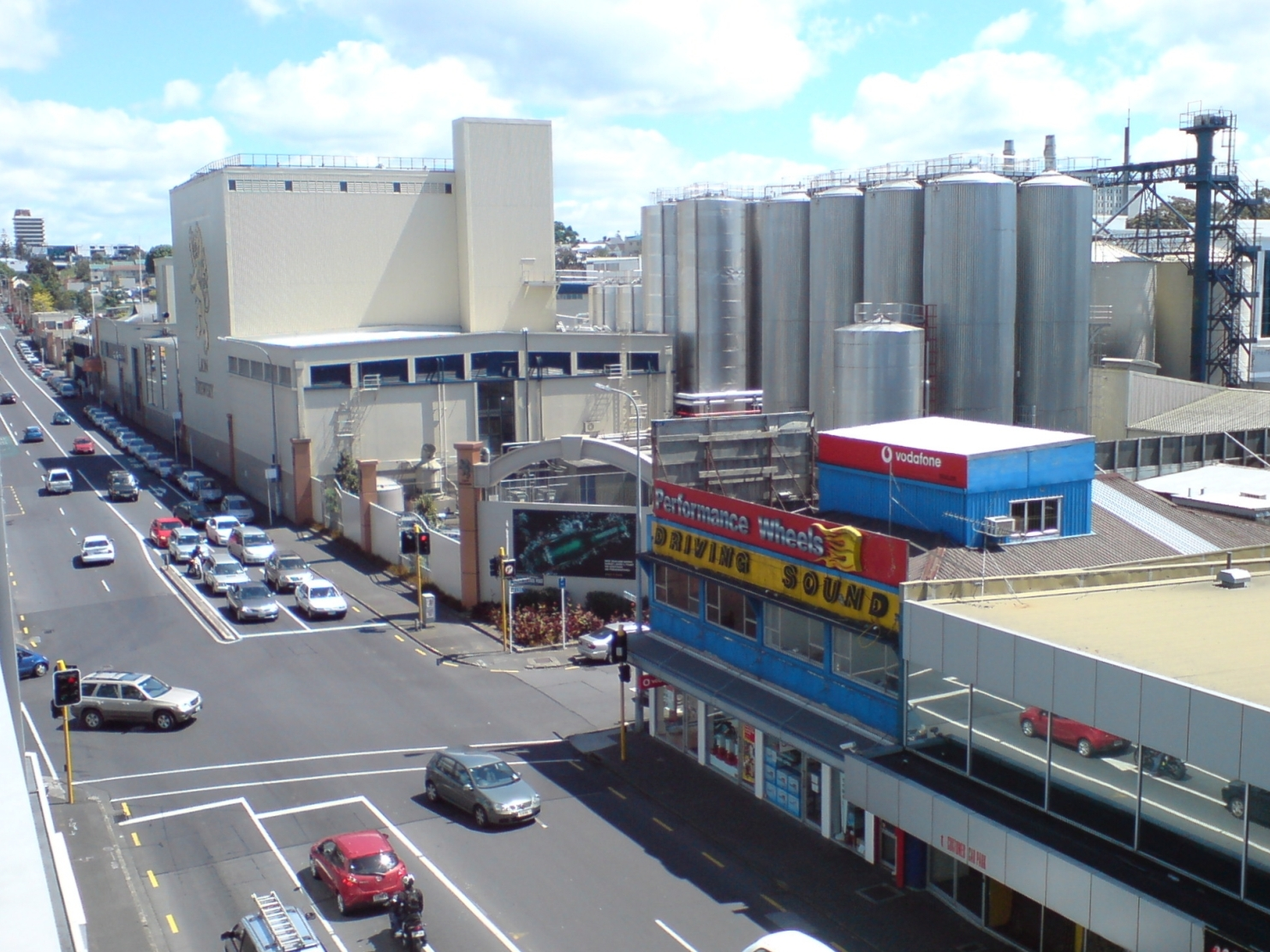
The Lion Brewery, which was converted into a University of Auckland campus in 2016
