= City Rail Link =

Rail project in Auckland, New Zealand

- CRL AM class train arriving at Karanga-a-Hape railway station, September 2026

Overview
- Owner: Auckland Transport; KiwiRail
- Locale: Central Auckland
- Transit type: Rapid transit Commuter rail
- Number of stations: 4
- Website: cityraillink.co.nz

Operation
- Began operation: 13 September 2026; 2 months ago
- Operator: Auckland One Rail
- Infrastructure managers: North Auckland Line (Maungawhau); North Island Main Trunk (Waitematā)
- Character: Underground

Technical
- System length: 3.45 km (2.14 mi)
- Track gauge: 1,067 mm (3 ft 6 in)
- Electrification: Overhead line, 25 kV 50 Hz AC
- Average speed: 70 km/h (43 mph)

Map of the City Rail Link tunnels

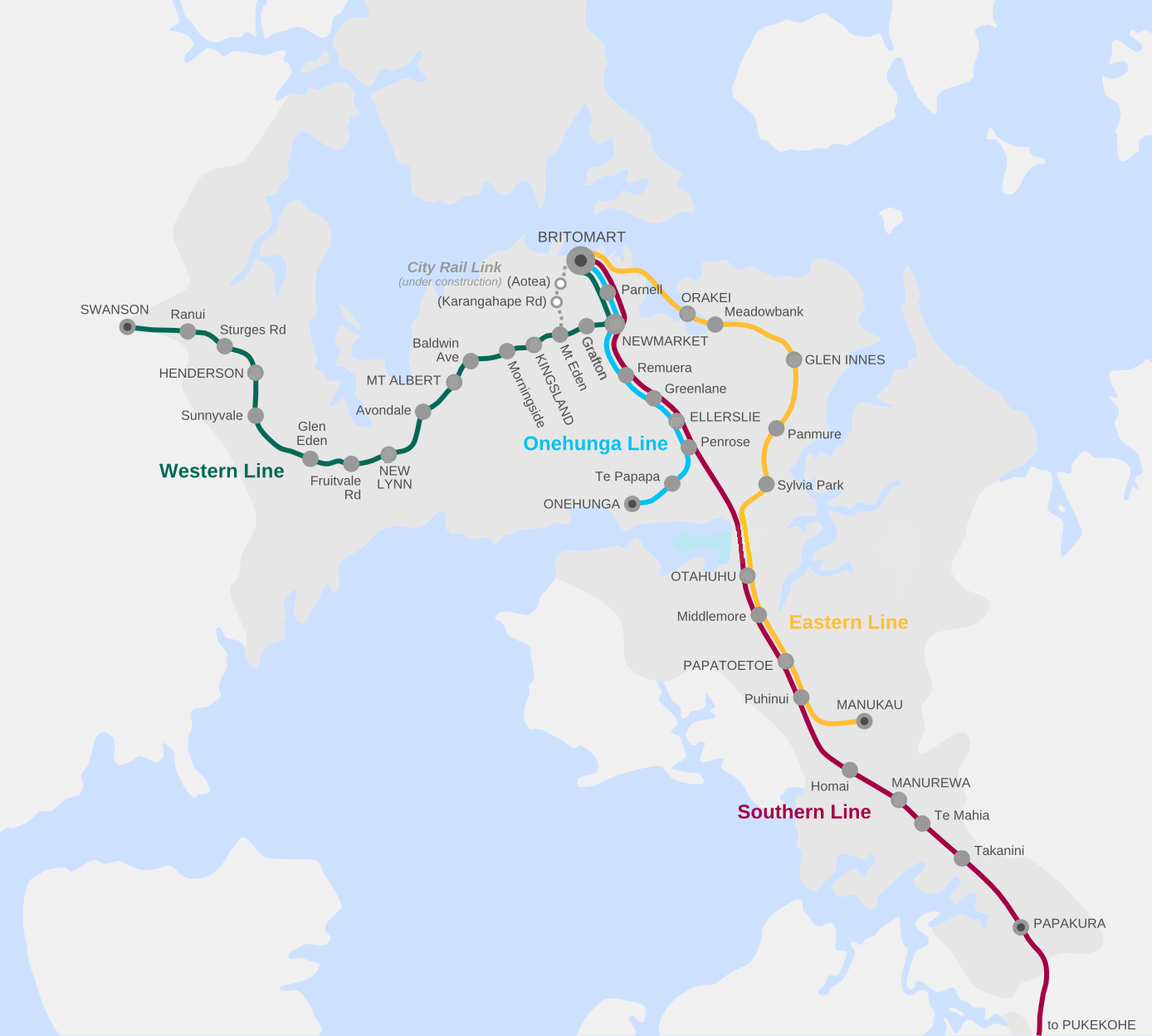
March 2017 current and proposed lines of the Auckland rail network, showing the City Rail Link between Waitematā (Britomart) and the vicinity of Maungawhau (Mt Eden)

Te Waihorotiu station platform

The City Rail Link (CRL) is an underground rapid transit system that forms an integrated part of the overground Auckland commuter railway network. It consists of pair of 3.45-kilometre-long (2.14 mi) tunnels underneath Auckland's city centre, extending the North Island Main Trunk railway line from its former terminus at Waitematā Station (formerly Britomart) to a junction with the North Auckland Line at Maungawhau Station.

Planned since 2013, construction began in 2018 and included two underground stations serving the city centre: Te Waihorotiu near Aotea Square and Karanga-a-Hape near Karangahape Road. Waitematā Station was converted from a terminus station into a through station, and Mount Eden station was replaced by Maungawhau Station, a station with four platforms to serve as an interchange between the CRL line and the Western Line.

The CRL is an adapted version of previous proposals to improve rail access to Auckland's city centre with the first proposals dating back to the 1920s. The increase in rail patronage in Auckland during the early 21st century, particularly after the opening of Britomart Transport Centre in 2003, led to renewed interest in the scheme. The 2012 Auckland Spatial Plan highlighted the CRL as the most important transport investment for Auckland and the project has enjoyed strong public support. Its planning and funding have also been the subject of controversy.

In June 2013, the central government announced its support for the project with a construction commencement date of 2020, four years later than Auckland Council's preferred start date of 2016. Prime Minister John Key announced in January 2016 that central government funding for the project had been confirmed, allowing Auckland Council to start construction of the main works from 2018, with central funds guaranteed to flow from 2020.

Preliminary stages of construction, including the relocation of stormwater infrastructure and tunnelling in the vicinity of the Commercial Bay redevelopment, began in 2016. Contracts for tunnel boring and construction of the CRL stations were awarded in July 2019, with major works beginning soon after.

Test trains commenced on 13 February 2025. In June 2026, the completed City Rail Link infrastructure was officially handed over from the Link Alliance to Auckland Transport and KiwiRail. It opened to the public on 13 September 2026.

== Initial proposals ==
=== 1920s Morningside Deviation ===
An early version of the City Rail Link emerged in 1918 when the New Lynn Town Board proposed a tunnel to Morningside. Serious planning schemes occurred as early as 1924. The route was to be graded at 1 in 100 to 1 in 80 and the tunnel was initially estimated at 116 chains (2.3 km) length and at £0.6 million. The plan was abandoned in 1930, when it was costed at £1 million. In 1936, Dan Sullivan the Minister of Railways argued that the scheme – then known as the 'Morningside Tunnel' or the 'Morningside Deviation', after the proposed southern portal location – would cost approximately £1 million, with another £1 million required for the electrification of the network. He expressed doubts that the tunnel would ever pay purely from a rail point of view, though he acknowledged that there might be other benefits and wider aspects to take into account. The Halcrow report in 1950 proposed a tube sized tunnel to Morningside.

=== 1970s rapid rail system ===
A 1965 proposal resulted in a June 1969 plan for a $12m single line loop, to run from Beach Road to stations near the Town Hall, a Hobson Street bus interchange and in Shortland Street. It was referred by the Minister of Works for further study. The 1970s plans envisaged a loop connecting with Newmarket as part of a major rapid transit scheme proposed by Dove-Myer Robinson, mayor of Auckland City at the time. Two main stations were proposed: one downtown in the vicinity of the Queen Street/Shortland Street intersection, and a second midtown between Queen Street and Mayoral Drive, about halfway between Aotea Square and Albert Park. A third city station was to be built at Karangahape Road, but this would have been a stop on the Western Line only. The plan was undermined by Council staff, criticised by academics and opposed by the New Zealand Town Planning Institute, before finally being rejected in 1976 by the Muldoon National government, which considered it to be too costly.

An alternative plan was put forward by Auckland City Council planners in 1979, involving an overhead railway from the then Beach Road railway station to the Britomart bus station (today, site of Waitematā railway station). Auckland Mayor Sir Dove-Myer Robinson noted the central government had just spent $33 million for new Wellington suburban trains (the EM class Ganz-Mavag units) and the overhead railway scheme would "cost considerably less while providing a far greater potential." The Auckland Regional Authority supported the plan, although wanted to see more work done on a ground option as well.

== History ==
=== 2000s rail revival / Britomart ===
In 2004, Auckland City Council prepared preliminary plans for an underground railway connecting Britomart Transport Centre to the Western Line in the vicinity of Mount Eden railway station and incorporating three new stations: near Aotea Square, Karangahape Road and the top of Symonds Street. The project would bring most of the city centre within a short walk of a station and increase the number of people living within a 30-minute train trip of the city centre by around 370,000.

The decision to electrify Auckland's rail network brought the tunnel back into focus as the key next step for developing Auckland's rail network. Estimates for the project's cost were around NZ$1.5 billion (or up to $2.4 billion according to other estimates), taking 12–16 years to plan and build.

On 5 March 2008, Auckland Regional Transport Authority (ARTA) announced preliminary planning for a 3.5 km (2.2 mi) tunnel between Britomart and Mount Eden, beneath Albert Street and including underground stations near Wellesley Street and Karangahape Road, with the Wellesley Street station, 18 m (59 ft 1 in) under the surface, potentially being larger and seeing more passengers than Britomart (projections of up to 7,700 per peak hour). By October 2008 ONTRACK said that it had reached an agreement in principle with the owners of Westfield Downtown (later rebranded as Downtown Shopping Centre) to allow the tunnel route to thread through the foundations of a proposed redevelopment of the site.

In 2009 and 2010, the discussion on the future tunnel gained much more prominence, with both candidates for the Mayoralty of the new Auckland Council, John Banks and Len Brown, making the tunnel part of their election platforms. Banks noted that it attracted cost-benefit returns much higher than many similar-sized roading projects, and would provide much enhanced, integrated access to the city centre. Brown also strongly supported the tunnel, and further, a rail connection to Auckland Airport, as part of a package of measures to double public transport patronage within 15 years. New Zealand's transport minister in 2010, Steven Joyce, warned Aucklanders not to engage in wishful thinking. The Minister's comments regarding the City Rail Link (and other rail investment), set in the context of the government's focus on delivering Roads of National Significance, has been considered politically risky – going against widespread opinion in Auckland that was in favour of better public transport. After ongoing and sustained lobbying by Brown to get central government support, the nickname "Len's loop" developed.

=== 2010s designation and design ===
In March 2010, KiwiRail/ARTA selected a preferred route with three stations: "Aotea" (beneath Albert Street between Victoria Street and Wellesley St), "K Road" (beneath Pitt Street adjacent to Karangahape Road) and "Newton" (beneath upper Symonds Street between the Khyber Pass Road/Newton Road intersection and the New North Road/Mt Eden Road intersection), at an estimated cost range of $1 billion to $1.5 billion. In May 2011 the Government noted that after reviewing an initial business case for the project, it was unconvinced of the economic benefits of the tunnel. Minister of Transport Steven Joyce noted that he would not stand in the way of Auckland continuing planning and route designation work – if Auckland paid for it. In June 2011 Auckland Council voted to approve $2 million for planning and route protection for the tunnel, with Auckland Transport, rather than KiwiRail, undertaking the process.

In March 2012, Auckland Council decided to bring forward spending from the 2012–2013 budget, in order to continue progress protecting the eventual route. $6.3 million was spent on work including geotechnical surveys, utility and building assessments, contaminated site reports and rail operations modelling and $1.7m towards providing a revised business case, requested by the government.

In July 2012, as part of the works around designating the route, Auckland Council released footprints for four stations. This included designation space for a not previously considered station on the current Western Line, just west of Dominion Road. This station would serve as an interchange station for passengers wanting to travel east in the Newmarket direction, in case the tunnel was built without an "Eastern Link" at the southern end that would allow trains exiting it to turn east. The station was later dropped by Auckland Transport and the "Eastern Link" retained in the route protection documents.

In June 2013, the central government announced its support for the project, albeit with a later construction start date of 2020 rather than 2015. The government stated it would consider an earlier start date if Auckland's CBD employment and rail patronage growth hit thresholds faster than projected rates of growth.

On 8 July 2013, following the 10-year anniversary of the opening of the Britomart Transport Centre, it was announced that Auckland Council and the new owners of the Downtown Shopping Centre had agreed to discuss building a section of tunnel under the mall during a redevelopment planned for 2016–17. The section would be up to 100 metres long.

On 1 August 2014, Auckland Transport announced a significant design change to the project, dropping the underground Newton Station in favour of a significant upgrade to Mount Eden Station. This change would save construction costs of $124 million, require fewer properties to be bought by Auckland Transport and in the long term save operational costs, with total savings being over $150 million. In addition, the change would allow Mount Eden Station to be connected to the CRL, which previously bypassed it, and would separate the east–west junctions, meaning that rail lines would not need to cross each other. The Mount Eden CRL platforms would now be built in an open-air trench, similar to that at New Lynn Station.

On 27 January 2016, Prime Minister John Key announced in a speech to the Auckland Chamber of Commerce that central government funding for main works construction of the CRL had been confirmed and this would allow Auckland Council to start to construct the main works from 2018, with central funds guaranteed to flow from 2020. Commentary at the time reflected an opinion that this was a belated agreement to central government funding of the project by the ruling National Party, while the main opposition parliamentary parties (Labour Party, Greens and NZ First) had all been promising immediate construction timetables which were more closely aligned to the plans of the council.

=== City Rail Link Limited ===
On 30 June 2017, Finance Minister Steven Joyce and Transport Minister Simon Bridges signed agreements with Auckland Mayor Phil Goff that established City Rail Link Limited (CRLL). Effective 1 July 2017, the company assumed responsibility for delivering the City Rail Link. Mr Joyce said that it was crucial that there be a single joint entity running the project and that CRLL was owned jointly by central and local government. Budget 2017 allocated $436 million to the City Rail Link project.

=== Capacity forecast forces platform enlargements ===
The CRL's underground rail lines were planned to have a capacity of 36,000 passengers per hour. That figure was expected to be reached in 2045. In July 2018, revised projections by City Rail Link Ltd (CRLL) showed the 36,000 capacity would be reached by 2035 – just 10 years after it opens. Although the trains are capable of having extra cars added in groups of three, the CRL station platforms, as originally specified, would not be long enough to accommodate nine-car trains. The proposed new capacity was 54,000 passengers per hour with the station platforms to be made longer so they can take the longer trains, and for an entry to be built at Beresford Square to complement Karanga-a-Hape Station's Mercury Lane entrance. The extra cost could run to the "low hundreds of millions" and would prevent a costly future two-year closure if the platform lengthening retrofitting work was carried out after the CRL was opened.

=== Station naming ===
In May 2022, the stations were gifted names by the CRL Mana Whenua Forum. These reflected the area's Māori history: Waitematā for Britomart, Te Wai Horotiu for Aotea, Karanga a Hape for Karangahape, and Maungawhau for Mt Eden.

Together with Auckland Transport, City Rail Link Ltd submitted these suggested names to the New Zealand Geographic Board (NZGB) for recognition. In August 2022, the Board returned the following verdicts: that the unofficial name 'Britomart' be altered to a new official name, 'Waitematā'; that the suggestion of 'Te Wai Horotiu' be accepted, and altered to 'Te Waihorotiu' in keeping with national and te reo Māori orthographic standards; that the suggestion of 'Karanga a Hape' be accepted, and altered to 'Karanga-a-Hape' in keeping with national and te reo Māori orthographic standards; that the unofficial name 'Mount Eden' be discarded, and replaced by an official dual name, 'Maungawhau / Mount Eden'.

In March 2023, the NZGB announced the decisions made by the Minister for Land Information Damien O'Connor. Te Wai Horotiu and Karanga a Hape were changed to Te Waihorotiu and Karanga-a-Hape respectively, as per the Board's recommendations. Britomart was also changed, to officially become Waitematā Railway Station. Breaking with the Board's recommendation, the Minister made the decision for the Mount Eden station to be called 'Maungawhau' only, not to have a dual name of 'Maungawhau / Mount Eden' as the board suggested.

== Proposed timeline ==
In February 2012, Auckland Council published the following proposed project timeline for the City Rail Link:

- 2010 Initial study for CRL project and potential route for protection
- 2011 Review of initial study; further feasibility investigations; project team established
- 2012 Confirm route for CRL
- 2013 Notice of Requirement (NOR) and consent applications; property purchase
- 2014 Begin tender process for project
- 2015–20 Construction
- 2020/21 CRL opens

CRL Chief Executive, Dr Sean Sweeney stated on the CRL website in late 2021 that the effects of the COVID-19 pandemic are "highly likely (to mean) there will be significant consequences for the project in terms of cost and completion" and these would become clearer late 2022 or early 2023. In 2023, the Minister of Transport, Michael Wood, said the construction by CRL should be finished by November 2025, but the project would then be handed over to Auckland Transport and KiwiRail for CRL-related work to be completed.

In 2023, the City Rail Link was expected to be completed in late 2025, with passenger services operating from 2026. In mid January 2024, Minister of Transport Simeon Brown confirmed that the National-led coalition government would continue work on the City Rail Link despite its policy of discontinuing the Auckland Light Rail project.

In early November 2024, Transport Minister Brown and Deputy Mayor of Auckland Desley Simpson announced that Auckland's passenger rail network would be shut down between 25 December and 26 January to facilitate upgrades ahead of the City Rail Link's completion. Brown and Simpson also confirmed that there would be a total of 96 days in Auckland without an operational train service over the following 13 months, with closures occurring during holidays, weekends and evenings.

On 21 February 2025, Transport Minister Chris Bishop and Mayor of Auckland Wayne Brown announced that the Government had allocated NZ$200 million of funding for the City Rail Link to remove level crossings in order to ease traffic congestion.

In June 2026, the completed City Rail Link infrastructure was officially handed over from the Link Alliance to Auckland Transport and KiwiRail. Ownership passed from the construction consortium to the operators, marking the final major milestone before the network opens to the public.

CRL was officially opened at a formal ribbon-cutting ceremony on 11 September 2026 by New Zealand Prime Minister, Christoper Luxon and Auckland Mayor, Wayne Brown. The first day of public operation was on 13 September 2026. Transport minister, Chris Bishop was on board the first train. The first week of operation contributed to the highest ever Auckland rail patronage, with 528,007 boardings, beating the previous record 7-day record of 504,380 set in March 2019.

== Construction ==
On 7 April 2015, two construction consortia were awarded the contracts to start the first construction phase of the city rail link. Construction of the early works package between Britomart and Wyndham Street started in October 2015. The Downer joint venture (Downer NZ and Soletanche Bachy) was chosen to design the rail link work through and under Britomart Station and Queen Street to Precinct Properties' Downtown Shopping Centre site, and construction started in early 2016. The Connectus consortium (McConnell Dowell and Hawkins) will construct the cut and cover tunnels under and along Albert Street from Customs Street to Wyndham Street. The work started in October 2015 with the relocation of a major stormwater line in Albert Street between Swanson and Wellesley Streets. Construction of these sections of the city rail link tunnels will coincide with Precinct Properties redevelopment of the Downtown Shopping Centre site, due to open by mid-2019.

The Downtown Shopping Centre was closed on 28 May 2016 and by 23 November had been demolished. It will be replaced with a 36-storey skyscraper which will include a new shopping centre in the lower levels. Auckland Council and proprietors Precinct Properties struck a deal to include tunnels for the City Rail Link directly underneath the premises.

In early December 2020, Mayor of Auckland Phil Goff unveiled a tunnel boring machine that would be used to drill two 1.6 km long tunnels from the Mount Eden railway station to central Auckland as part of the City Rail Link. The TBM was named after Māori leader Dame Whina Cooper. On 14 September 2022 the TBM Dame Whina Cooper broke through into the station box of Te Waihorotiu Station, completing the second of the two tunnels needed for the project. Tracklaying was then commenced by Martinus Rail, who use battery-electric locomotives based at Quay Park junction.

In 2023, it was reported that the effects of COVID-19, high inflation and staffing issues had increased the cost of the project by $1 billion to $5.493 billion. The opening of the project would also be delayed to the end of 2025 at the earliest.

=== Construction methods ===
The City Rail Link was constructed using both cut-and-cover and tunnel boring machine (TBM) methods depending on the location of construction. The ground through which the tunnels were built varies between rock and soft soil, and with a variation in depth to natural ground level of between 40 metres and 0 metres. Cut and cover construction occurred around the existing Mount Eden railway station and in the suburb of Eden Terrace, forming the junction of the City Rail Link to the North Auckland Line. North of the junction, twin bored tunnels then extend as far as Mayoral Drive. Another section of cut and cover tunnel then extends north underneath Albert Street, before turning east to head underneath the redeveloped Downtown Shopping Centre and into Britomart. The public got a look inside the tunnels in November 2019. In 2023, the government confirmed a date of 2025 for construction. At this point the project is handed over to Auckland Transport and it will be up to Auckland Transport and KiwiRail to announce when their CRL-related work will be finished.

The line was mainly bored through East Coast Bays Formation of sandstones and siltstones. It is expected that 2 million tonnes of spoil will be dug out from 2020 and it has been proposed to use it to double the single track section of the North Island Main Trunk line across Whangamarino wetland.

Some landowners around Albert Street, including the Ministry of Justice, which owns and operates the Auckland District Court on Albert Street, expressed concern that construction of the cut and cover tunnel would disrupt foot and vehicular traffic along Albert Street over a period of two years with several intersections along the street being closed for up to 18 months. The Department of Corrections also expressed concern that grade-separating the Normanby Road level crossing (as part of the cut and cover works at the southern end of the project) would cut off access to Mount Eden Prisons.

== Stations and depot ==
=== Waitematā ===
Following completion of the CRL, most trains no longer terminate at Waitematā. Platforms 1 and 4 are through platforms, while platforms 2 and 3 are stabling platforms.

The number of in-service platforms was reduced from 5 to 4 in 2022, with the in-use platforms changing as construction progressed, and the original platform 2 permanently decommissioned. The original platforms 3–5 became platforms 2–4.

=== Te Waihorotiu ===
This station was constructed by the cut-and-cover method, 15 metres (49 ft) deep under Albert Street. As originally planned, it is 300 metres (980 ft) long and runs between Victoria Street and Wellesley Street.

=== Karanga-a-Hape ===
This station is 32 metres (105 ft) underground. Original plans were for platforms 150 metres (490 ft) long, with an entrance on Mercury Lane, and with early plans making provision for an entrance that would be added later on Beresford Square. Assessments of passenger numbers in 2018 indicated that longer trains and platforms would be needed earlier, and a decision was made to lengthen the platforms so as to incorporate the Beresford Square entrance from the outset.

Demolition of buildings on Mercury Lane began on 4 November 2019. Demolition at this site was to be done in two phases, with completion expected in April 2020. Demolition of buildings at the Beresford Square site were expected to take three years.

=== Maungawhau ===
In October 2019, demolition of 30 buildings in the vicinity of this station began. This first stage of three phases of demolition was expected to be completed by March 2020.

=== Wiri depot ===
To accommodate the new trains the Wiri Maintenance and Stabling Depot was expanded with an additional 10 stabling roads, along with increased charging stations and maintenance bays.

== Train services ==
=== Initial proposals ===
As of June 2023 the train network for the period following the completion of the CRL had not been officially confirmed, Auckland Transport released a preliminary plan proposing that the Western and Eastern Lines be connected through the CRL, forming the East West line. With the Southern Line looping anticlockwise around the Newmarket Line and CRL, doubling back upon itself as far as Ōtāhuhu station as the South City line. The Onehunga Line ceasing to run into the city, instead heading west from Newmarket as a crosstown line. The 'Onehunga West line' terminating at Maungawhau/Mt Eden station during peak hours to make way for the East West line, before being extended to Henderson during inter-peak hours and weekends. A Southern Express service to Pukekohe via the Eastern Line was also proposed.

This operating pattern was first hinted at in early 2022 in the Auckland Light Rail group's Indicative Business Case appendices, which showed a proposed but discarded Airport heavy rail option where half of all Western Line services diverted from Avondale to Auckland Airport via Onehunga. In June 2023, this operating pattern was confirmed in the draft Regional Public Transport Plan 2023–2031.

The South City line and the East West line were to run every 15 minutes all-day, increasing to every 7 to 8 minutes at peak times. The Onehunga West line and the Southern Express Line running every 30 minutes all-day.

=== Temporary 2026 network ===
The temporary 2026 network produced by Auckland Transport was very similar to the initial proposals. The temporary plan had the current Eastern and Western lines through-run with each other as the new East West line (E-W), running between Manukau and Swanson via the CRL. The current Southern Line would become the South City line (S-C), running between Pukekohe and Newmarket via the CRL. The current Onehunga Line would become the Onehunga West line (O-W), running between Onehunga and Maungawhau during weekday peak times and between Onehunga and Henderson during off-peak times. The temporary network would see frequencies remain at 6 tph before increasing to 8 tph during peak on the East West line (E-W) for about 6 months after the CRL opens.

=== Final network ===
The final network produced by Auckland Transport is the same as the temporary 2026 timetable but with minor changes. The final plans has some East West line trains terminating and originating at Newmarket during peak. The South City line will instead runs between Pukekohe and Otahuhu via the CRL. This also means inner South City line stations also have trains running via Parnell. No changes to the Onehunga West line from the temporary network. The final network also sees frequencies on East West line increase to 8 tph during peak.

== Business case ==
One of the most contentious aspects of the CRL is whether it is economically sensible to build it. The results vary widely depending on whether certain ancillary projects are included, whether one assumes economic benefits outside purely transport effects (such as increased land value) and depending on what length of time is assumed for the benefit calculation. In this regard, Council experts have highlighted that NZ calculation methods use a 30-year cut-off (i.e. for evaluation purposes, the tunnel provides no benefit after 30 years, even though much of Auckland's earlier rail and road infrastructure already serves for much longer than that). In comparison, if using evaluation periods of 50 years (used in Australia), or 60 years (used in the UK), the total project benefits for the city rail link have been estimated as up to 6 times higher than with the 30-year time frame.

The "City Centre Future Access Study" (CCFAS) was prepared by Auckland Transport and released in December 2012. The CCFAS analysed a number of different ways of improving access to Auckland's city centre and concluded that the CRL was essential, noting that bus-only investment will provide for short-term benefits but in some cases will be 'worse than doing nothing' for private vehicle travel times in the longer term. In July 2013, the Transport Agency's board agreed that transport projects were to be assessed for a 40-year evaluation period, but also reduced the discount rate from 8% to 6%.

=== Benefits ===
The key benefits of the City Rail Link were intended to be:

- Turning Waitematā (formerly Britomart) from a terminus station into a through station, allowing more than twice the existing train capacity through the core of the network (from a maximum of 20 trains per hour, to be reached in 2016, to a projected 48 trains per hour), allowing trains to run every five minutes on the existing suburban lines
- Providing two new train stations, Te Waihorotiu and Karanga-a-Hape, in the Auckland CBD, making most of the city centre easily accessible by train rapid transit and improving overall end to end trip times. This will boost economic activity and development in these areas and relieve projected transport access constraints
- Reducing the duration of trips on the Western Line significantly, by removing the need to deviate to Newmarket and around the east of the CBD
- Allowing lines on opposite sides of the city to be through routed via the tunnel, providing direct crosstown rail connections
- Providing train capacity to allow new lines to be added to the network – including, but not limited to, other potential longer-term projects such as Airport Rail or North Shore Rail
- Doubling the number of Aucklanders who have 30 minutes duration rail access to the CBD
- Increasing platform length at Waitematā to accommodate 9 car trains (up from maximum 6 cars at present), and building the new stations with 9 car long platforms from the start

A study conducted in 2018, suggests that the City Rail Link will improve the accessibility to economic opportunities for people in the more deprived regions of south, east and west Auckland.

=== Cost estimates ===
An estimated cost of $2.86 billion was often quoted for the project, but this cost was inflated out to the year of construction. The cost of the project in 2010 was $2.311 billion. That price also included not only the tunnel link with three stations (a deep-level Newton station was later dropped), but additional trains, duplication of the Onehunga Branch to two tracks and other small improvements to Auckland's rail network. These additional items were intended to further increase the capacity of Auckland's rail network when the rail link opens, the main benefit posed by the project.

In September 2016, the government formally confirmed its intention to fund its proposed share of 50% of the City Rail Link. The cost of the City Rail Link was then re-estimated to be between $2.8 and $3.4 billion, subject to tenders for remaining contracts.

In mid-April 2019, it was revealed that the cost of the project had risen by more than $1 billion to $4.419 billion. In 2023, CRL announced the cost of the project was now estimated to be $5.493bn.

== Public opinion ==
A public opinion poll published on 27 June 2012 found 63% of Aucklanders surveyed were in favour of the tunnel, 29% were against it and 8% did not care. The poll was conducted by Research New Zealand.

Another poll in November showed similar support amongst Aucklanders at 64%. Only 14% overall opposed the building of the rail link; 18% were neutral. Support was lowest in those areas not served directly by rail. The same number of those who support it want it built as soon as possible, while 22% of supporters want it built by 2020. Over 50% of respondents wanted the central Government to contribute significantly to the cost of the project, with 30% of respondents overall supporting road tolling to pay for the project. One quarter of respondents overall supported "targeted rates".

== See also ==
- Public transport in Auckland
- Rail transport in New Zealand
- List of Auckland railway stations

=== Similar projects in Australia ===
- Cross River Rail, Brisbane
- Metro Tunnel, Melbourne
- Sydney Metro City & Southwest, Sydney
- William Street tunnel, Perth
