= Kingsland railway station, Auckland =

Train station in New Zealand

Kingsland
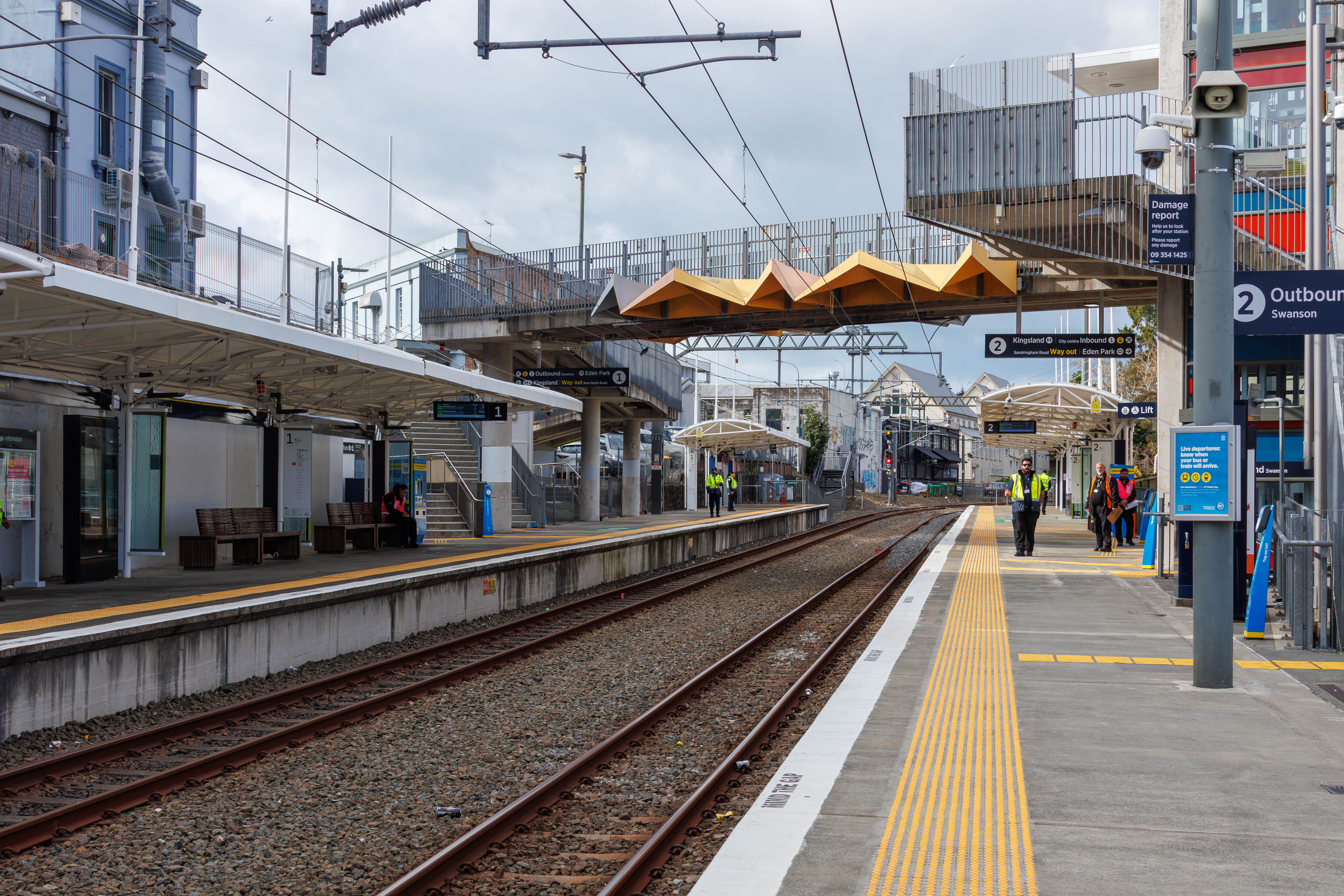
- Kingsland station in 2026

General information
- Location: Kingsland, Auckland; New Zealand
- Coordinates: 36.872523°S 174.744641°E
- System: Auckland Transport urban rail
- Owner: KiwiRail (track and platforms); Auckland Transport (buildings)
- Operator: Auckland One Rail
- Line: North Auckland Line
- Distance: 11.94 km (7.42 mi) from Westfield Junction
- Platforms: Side platforms (P1 & P2)
- Tracks: Mainline (2)

Construction
- Parking: No
- Cycle facilities: Yes
- Accessible: Yes (Lifts)

Other information
- Fare zone: City/Isthmus (overlap)

History
- Opened: 29 March 1880; 146 years ago
- Rebuilt: 2004–2005
- Electrified: 20 July 2015

Passengers
- 2009: 1,085 passengers/day

Services
Preceding station	Auckland Transport (Auckland One Rail)	Following station
Morningside towards Swanson	East West Line	Maungawhau towards Manukau
Morningside towards Henderson	Onehunga West Line	Maungawhau towards Onehunga
Location

Kingsland railway station is a station on the East West line and Onehunga West line of the Auckland railway network in New Zealand. The station sits parallel to the Kingsland township, and is located 400m from Eden Park, the major rugby and cricket stadium in Auckland, and the home ground of New Zealand's national rugby team, the All Blacks.

The station's proximity to Eden Park means that it often functions as a terminus for stadium-goers, with dedicated services utilising both tracks to shuttle people into and out of Kingsland. Signalling was upgraded in 2011 to assist with this.

Kingsland Station used to consist of a single platform, and was situated further east of its present location, but in 2004 it was relocated as part of the Auckland rail network's double-tracking project. The old station's platform was demolished, but its shelter was retained and is now used by the Glenbrook Vintage Railway.

The station now utilises a side platform configuration for each direction of travel and is accessible from New North Road and Sandringham Road. An overbridge enables transfer between platforms, and a subway links the northbound platform to the Eden Park end of Sandringham Road.

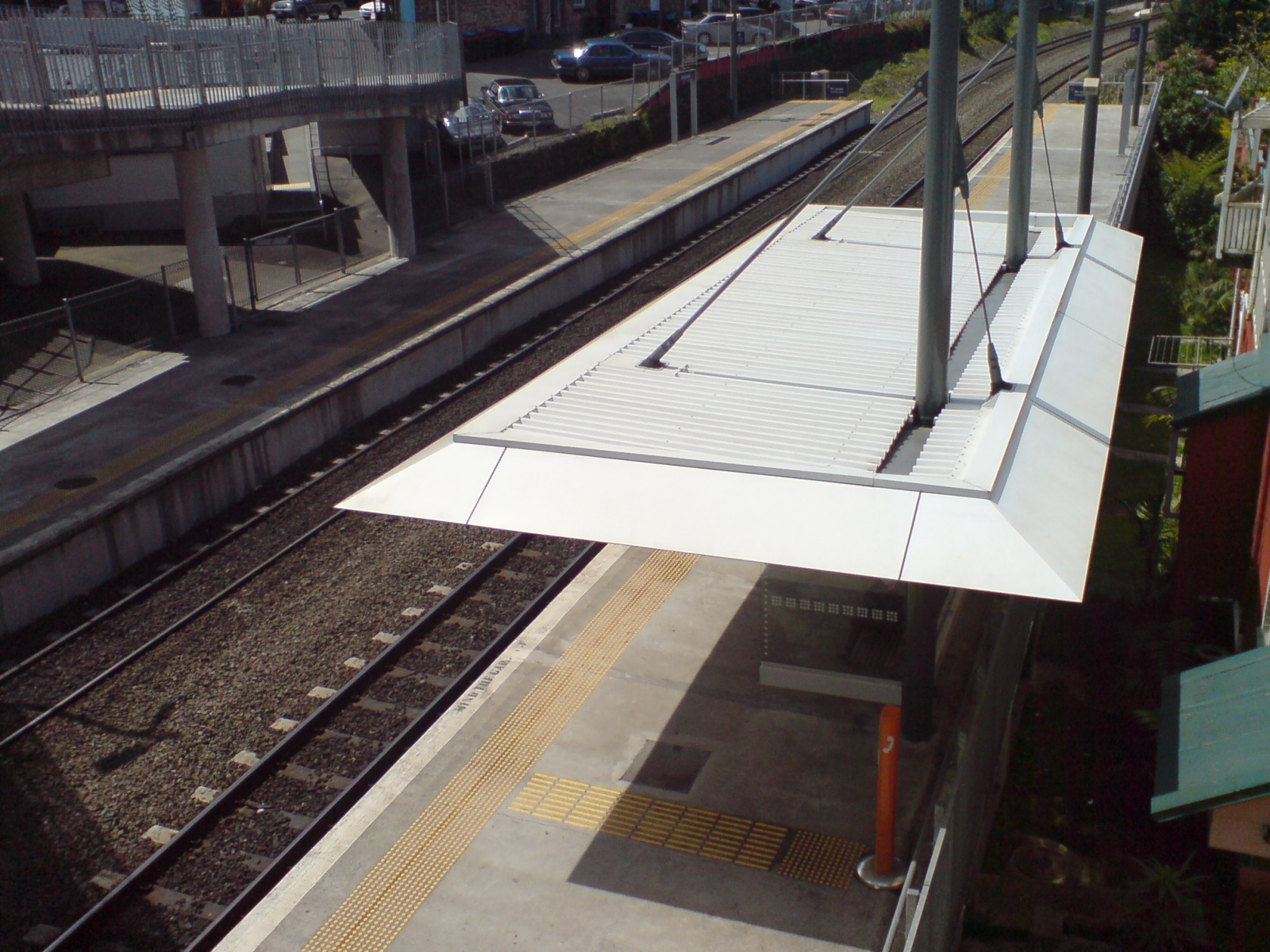
The platforms from the footbridge looking east in 2008.

== History ==
- 1880: Opened on 29 March, with the North Auckland Line.
- 1993: Platform upgraded to meet the requirements of ex-Perth diesel multiple units.
- 2003: Old station removed.
- 2004: Rebuilt with two platforms as part of the Western Line double-tracking project, for $4 million.
- 2009-2010: Platforms lengthened to 115 m for six-car trains, and new stairs and an underpass from Sandringham Road to the northbound platform constructed, for $6 million. Signalling was upgraded to allow trains to leave from both platforms in the same direction to meet the needs of the 2011 Rugby World Cup, where it was expected that 15,000 fans would use the station in 70 minutes. Groups of 1,000 fans at a time were to board trains, departing every five minutes.
- 2011, June–August: shelters upgraded for the Rugby World Cup, made from the same materials as when building The Cloud on Auckland's waterfront.

== Services ==
East West and Onehunga West line suburban train services are provided by Auckland One Rail on behalf of Auckland Transport.

Bus routes 20, 22N, 22R, 24B, 24R, 64, 209 and some express service routes 221, 223, 243, and 249 pass near to Kingsland station on either New North Road or Sandringham Road.

== In media ==
- In the film Mr. Pip, Kingsland railway station appears as Gravesend station in England.
- The eighth season of The Block NZ features restoration and transformation of an apartment block formerly being a fire house overlooking Eden Park's Outer Oval, and is situated near the station.

== See also ==
- List of Auckland railway stations
- Public transport in Auckland
- Personal safety advice, 17 October 2022
