= Maungawhau railway station =

Train station in Auckland, New Zealand

Maungawhau
- Maungawhau station main entrance, 2026

General information
- Location: Mount Eden, Auckland; New Zealand
- Coordinates: 36°52′05″S 174°45′33″E
- System: Auckland Transport urban rail
- Owner: KiwiRail (track and platforms); Auckland Transport (buildings)
- Operator: Auckland One Rail
- Lines: North Island Main Trunk (NIMT); North Auckland Line (NAL); East Link
- Distance: 684.98 km (425.63 mi) from Wellington (NIMT); 10.59 km (6.58 mi) from Westfield Junction (NAL)
- Platforms: Lower island platform (P1 & P2); Upper island platform (P3 & P4)

Construction
- Platform levels: 2
- Parking: No
- Cycle facilities: Yes
- Accessible: Yes (Lifts)

Other information
- Station code: MTD
- Fare zone: City

History
- Opened: 29 March 1880
- Rebuilt: 2020–2026
- Former names: Mount Eden

Passengers
- 2014: 1,018 passengers/day ▲9.7%

Services
Preceding station	Auckland Transport (Auckland One Rail)	Following station
Kingsland towards Swanson	East West Line	Karanga-a-Hape towards Manukau
Kingsland towards Henderson	Onehunga West Line	Grafton towards Onehunga
Former services (pre-2020)
Preceding station	Auckland Transport (Auckland One Rail)	Following station
Grafton towards Waitematā	Western Line Suspended 2020-2026	Kingsland towards Swanson
Location

Maungawhau railway station, formerly known as Mount Eden railway station, is a railway station of the Auckland railway network in the Auckland suburb of Mount Eden in New Zealand. The station was closed between 2020 and 2026 to undergo an extensive reconstruction as part of the wider work on the City Rail Link. Originally a station on the North Auckland Line (NAL), it became a junction station with the North Island Main Trunk (NIMT) following the construction of the CRL tunnels. The East Link line lies entirely within the station limits, connecting the NIMT to the NAL in the eastward direction. The reconstruction work added another island platform on the NIMT.

== History ==
- 1880: Opened as one of the original stations on the North Auckland Line.
- 1912: The present island platform and a new station building were constructed.
- 1914: A signal box was established.
- 1964: Lost much school traffic when some trains began to stop at St Peter's College (at the now closed Boston Road station and its replacement, the nearby Grafton station).
- 1967: Following the introduction of centralised traffic control, the signal box was removed.
- Mid-1990s: The old station building was sold and removed, and is now located further up the track, past Morningside station, and is in use as a private home.
- 2004: An upgraded station was opened.
- 2019: An announcement that the station will be closed for four years from June 2020 for improvement as part of work for the City Rail Link starts.
- 2020: Following a delay caused by the COVID-19 lockdown, Mt Eden Station closed on 11 July.
- 2023: The name of the station was officially changed from Mount Eden Station to Maungawhau Railway Station. Maungawhau is the Māori name of the nearby volcano that translates to mountain (maunga) of the cork tree (whau).
- 2026: The station reopened for City Rail Link operation.

== City Rail Link ==
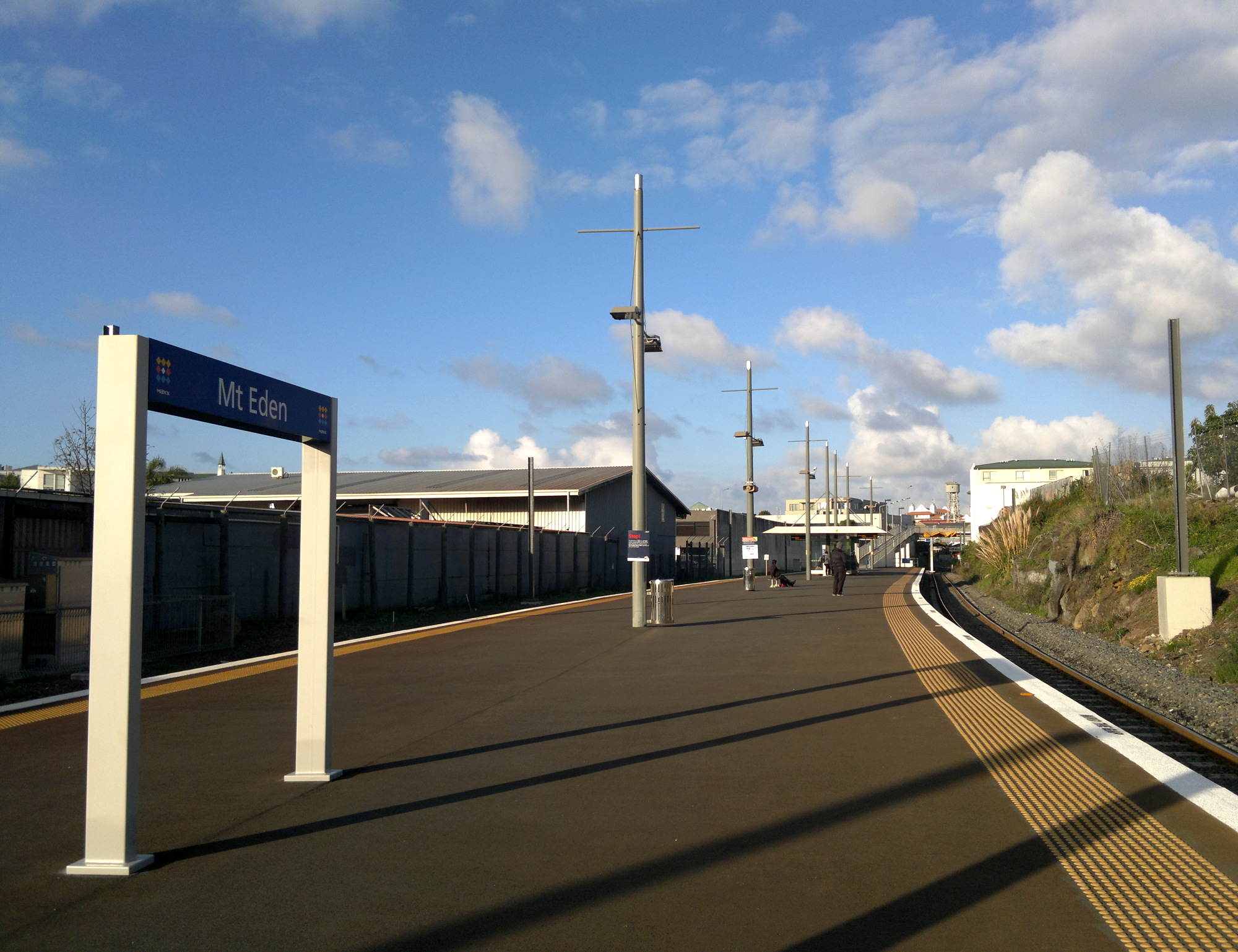
View of the former station from the western end of the platform, 2014

Auckland Transport (AT) changed their City Rail Link (CRL) plans by removing the proposed Newton station and instead adding another platform at Mount Eden with a trench-styled layout similar to New Lynn railway station. The benefit, according to the Mayor of Auckland Len Brown, was a saving of NZD$150 million. AT chairman Lester Levy said that there had been concerted effort to optimise the design and reduce construction cost. "The change that has resulted from this focus will reduce cost by removing the very deep Newton station, which will also reduce construction disruption in upper Symonds St by 12 to 18 months. The improved design will connect passengers at Mt Eden Station to the CRL which previously bypassed them and improve operation reliability through the provision of a separated east-west junction so train lines won’t need to cross over each other." Levy said the changes also will result in an improved customer experience with the CRL platform at Mount Eden to be built in a trench similar to the New Lynn station, and be open to the sky, rather than deep underground as was the case for the proposed Newton station location. This open air location and the separated train junction will also lower operating costs.

To allow the CRL to connect to the west toward Swanson and to the east toward Newmarket, Mount Eden station closed on 11 July 2020. The Western Line was realigned between Dominion Road and Mount Eden Prison, with consequent changes to overhead line and signalling systems.

In October 2019, demolition of 30 buildings in the station vicinity commenced. This first of three phases of demolition was expected to be completed in March 2020. The new station reopened in 2026.

== Signal box ==
The Mt Eden Local Control Panel was installed in the station building in 1967 and removed from service in 1995 when the station building was removed. The panel has been preserved in working order.

== Station design ==
Lower platforms 1 & 2, 2026

Lower platforms 1 & 2 on the E-W line and upper platforms 3 & 4 on the S-C line, 2026

The station incorporates Māori culture and narratives into the overall design. On the station entrance building, a façade formed of aluminium fins in triangle patterns represents the "sky element" of the building. The sky element symbolises the tears of Ranginui, the Sky Father after his separation from Papatūānuku (Earth Mother). Inside the station building, above the ticketing area, is the "threshold element" of ceiling panels including a triangular pattern referencing Mataaho, atua or deity of volcanoes. The glazed canopy, located on the outside of the building, represents "te whaiao" or "the first glimmer of daylight". This was inspired by the Māori god, Tāne, pushing apart his parents. The basalt tiles and boulders used on the exterior and interior of the station represents the "earth element" as does a waterwall representing water in lava caves.

The station is located on the North Island Main Trunk and has four platforms. Platform 1 heads towards the city via Karanga-a-Hape. Platform 2 heads west towards Kingsland. Platform 3 heads towards the city via Grafton. Platform 4 heads in two directions, towards either Grafton or Kingsland.

== Services ==
Auckland One Rail operates train services on behalf of Auckland Transport from Maungawhau station. It is served by Onehunga West line trains to Onehunga and Henderson off-peak. During peak, Onehunga West line trains terminate here. East West line trains to Manukau and Swanson also serve this station.

== Artwork ==
Parawhenuamea artwork inside main station entrance, 2026

The station features Māori artwork, by mana whenua artist Tessa Harris (Ngāi Tai ki Tāmaki). The large interior waterwall is named Parawhenuamea after the atua (deity) of freshwater. The large triangle represents nearby volcano Maungawhau (Mount Eden). The waterwall is precast concrete and local basalt. 53 glass triangles, designed by Harris and crafted by Sofia Athineou, are a map of the volcanic cones across Tāmaki Makaurau (Auckland).

Harris also designed the station's "threshold element" ceiling panels and the Karā Toki (basalt chisel) bridge. Other station artworks were designed by mana whenua artists Graham Tipene and Reuben Kirkwood.

== See also ==
- List of Auckland railway stations
- Public transport in Auckland
