= Karanga-a-Hape railway station =

Train station in Auckland, New Zealand

Karanga-a-Hape
- Mercury Lane main entrance, 2026

General information
- Location: Karangahape Road, Auckland; New Zealand
- Coordinates: 36°51′32″S 174°45′33″E
- System: Auckland Transport Urban rail
- Owner: Auckland Transport
- Operator: Auckland One Rail
- Line: North Island Main Trunk
- Distance: 683.75 km (424.86 mi) from Wellington
- Platforms: Side platforms (P1 & P2)
- Tracks: 2

Construction
- Structure type: Underground
- Depth: 33 m (108 ft)
- Parking: No (planned)
- Cycle facilities: Yes
- Accessible: Yes; Lifts

Other information
- Station code: KRD
- Fare zone: City

History
- Opened: 13 September 2026

Services
Preceding station	Auckland Transport (Auckland One Rail)	Following station
Maungawhau towards Swanson	East West Line	Te Waihorotiu towards Manukau
Grafton towards Pukekohe	South City Line	Te Waihorotiu towards Newmarket
Route map
- Bold stations are City Rail Link stations
Location

Karanga-a-Hape railway station, is an underground station of the Auckland railway network, located in Auckland, New Zealand. It opened on 13 September 2026 as part of the City Rail Link (CRL) project. It serves the South City, and East West lines of the Auckland railway network.

Beresford Square entrance, 2026

Platform 1 with South City line train

It serves the Karangahape Road area with entrances in Beresford Square, and on Mercury Lane. Karanga-a-Hape is the deepest train station in New Zealand, reaching 33 metres down and featuring 203 metre long platforms.

== History ==
Proposals for a link between downtown Auckland and central suburb train routes have been around since the 1920s, but the first proposal involving a station on Karangahape Road came in 2003. Auckland Council proposed an underground line running between Britomart and Maungawhau-Mount Eden station, including two new stations at Aotea Square and Karangahape Road.

After consultation on a tunnelled rail line through the Auckland CBD, the Auckland Regional Transport Authority (ARTA) and KiwiRail announced their preferred route in 2010 featuring three stations. Starting in Britomart, the route would go up to "Aotea" station underneath Albert Street, then "K Road" station, then a station on Upper Symonds Street.

In September 2015 Auckland Council announced that the entrance to the station would be on Mercury Lane, with future proofing for a second entrance at Beresford Square. In 2018 the plans were expanded to include building the second entrance, along with lengthening the platforms to accommodate 9-car trains.

Demolition work for the Mercury Lane site began on 4 November 2019, taking out the prominent Mercury Plaza foodcourt and some surrounding buildings. Tunneling from Mount Eden station to Karanga-a-Hape station began on 26 April 2022, with the Dame Whina Cooper Herrenknecht TBM breaking through on 15 July 2022. In March 2023, the station was officially renamed from Karangahape station to Karanga-a-Hape station, after the four City Rail Link stations were gifted te reo Māori names by the project's Mana Whenua Forum. The name is a corrected spelling of Karangahape and can be translated as ‘The Call of Hape’.

In November 2023, Auckland Transport announced it would be pedestrianising the upper portion of Mercury Lane in order to improve accessibility.

== Station design ==
Ko Tāne Pupuke Mercury Lane main entrance artwork

The station incorporates Māori culture and narratives into the overall design. On the Mercury Lane entrance building, a façade formed of aluminium fins in a taimana (diamond) pattern represents the "sky element" of the building. The sky element symbolises Ranginui, the Sky Father and Te Ikaroa (the Milky Way). Inside the station building, above the ticketing area, is the "threshold element" of three pūpūrangi (kauri snail) sculptures. The glazed canopy, located on the outside of the building, represents "te whaiao" or "the daylight or glimmer of daylight". This was inspired by the Māori god, Tāne, pushing apart his parents. The concrete panels on the exterior of the station represents the "earth element" and pays tribute to Papatūānuku, the Earth Mother.

The station is located on the North Island Main Trunk, is 33 metres underground and features New Zealand's longest escalator. Platform 1 is the northbound platform heading towards Te Waihorotiu and Platform 2 is the southbound platform heading towards Maungawhau.

== Services ==
Auckland One Rail operates train services on behalf of Auckland Transport from Karanga-a-Hape station. It is located within the City fare zone and is served by South City line trains to Pukekohe and Newmarket and East West line trains to Manukau and Swanson.

== Artwork ==
Me te Ōturu Beresford Square entrance artwork

The station features Māori artwork, by mana whenua artist Reuben Kirkwood (Ngāi Tai ki Tāmaki, Waikato Tainui, Waiohua, Ngāti Ruanui). Above the Mercury Lane entrance exterior, is Me te Rangi ka paruhi meaning “like a glorious tranquil day” which is made up of dark concrete panels with pākati (traditional carving pattern) and with two manaia figures representing the relationship between ira atua, the spiritual world and ira tangata, the human world.

Kirkwood also created the artwork inside the station near the Beresford Square entrance depicting rays of sunlight and the phases of the moon, called Me te Ōturu which means “like the full moon”; Te Pō, the exterior air intake structure on Beresford Square; and the Mercury Lane threshold element called Ko Tāne Pupuke meaning “Tāne rises up”.

== See also ==
- List of Auckland railway stations
- Public transport in Auckland
