= Chris Bailey (artist) =

New Zealand sculptor (born 1965)

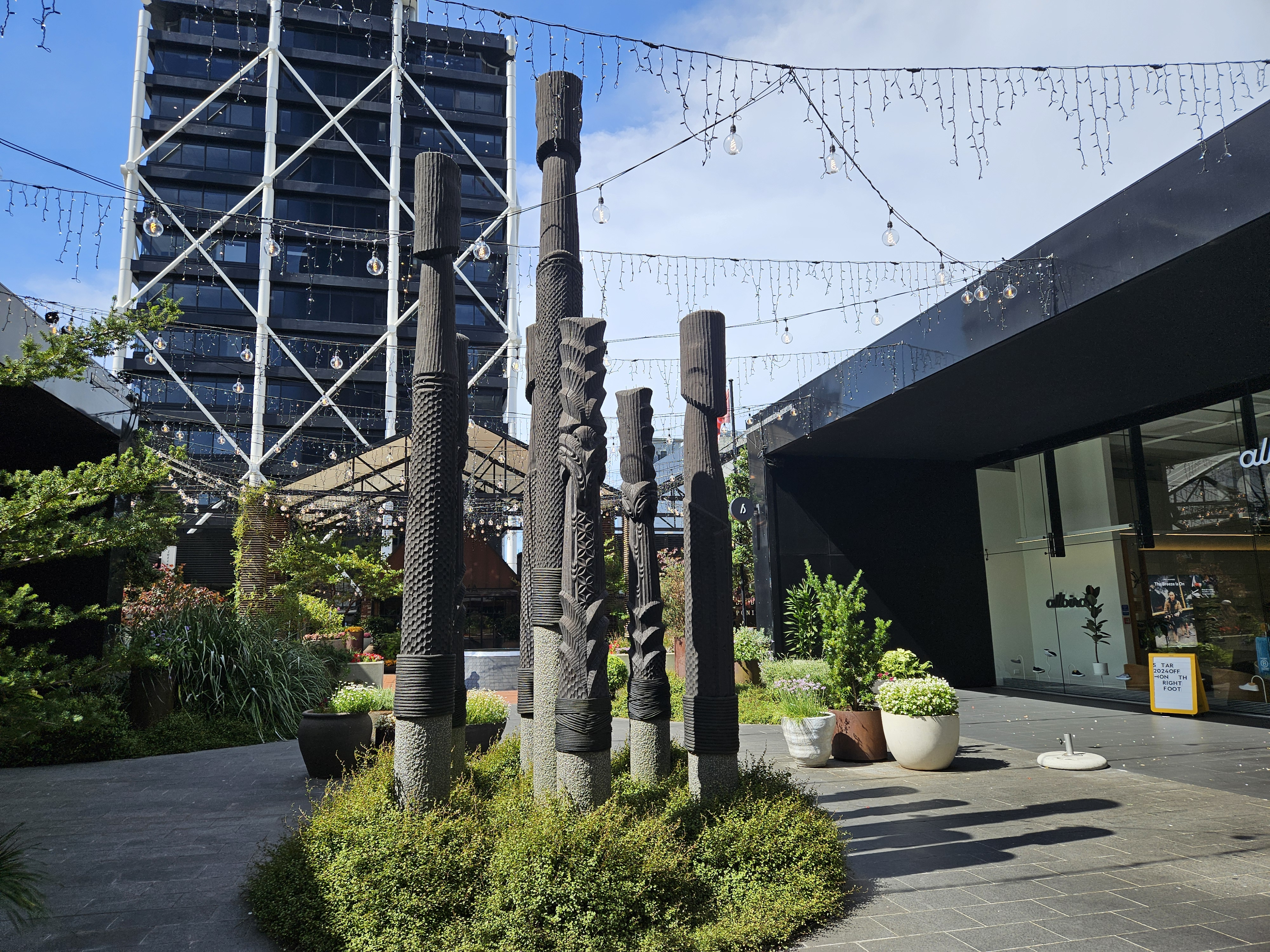
Pou Tū Te Rangi (2011) on the Auckland waterfront

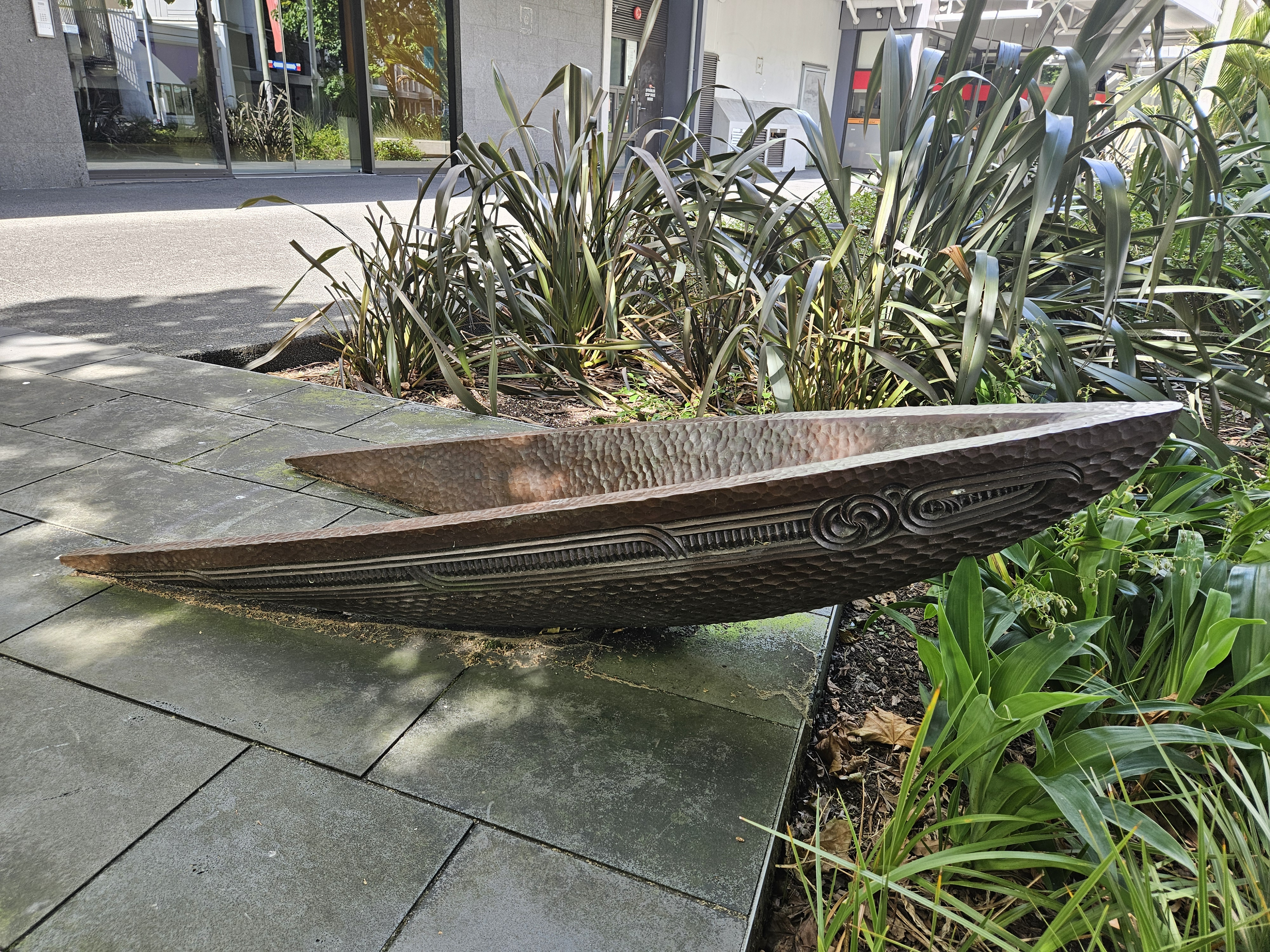
Tauranga Waka (2016) on Beach Road, Auckland

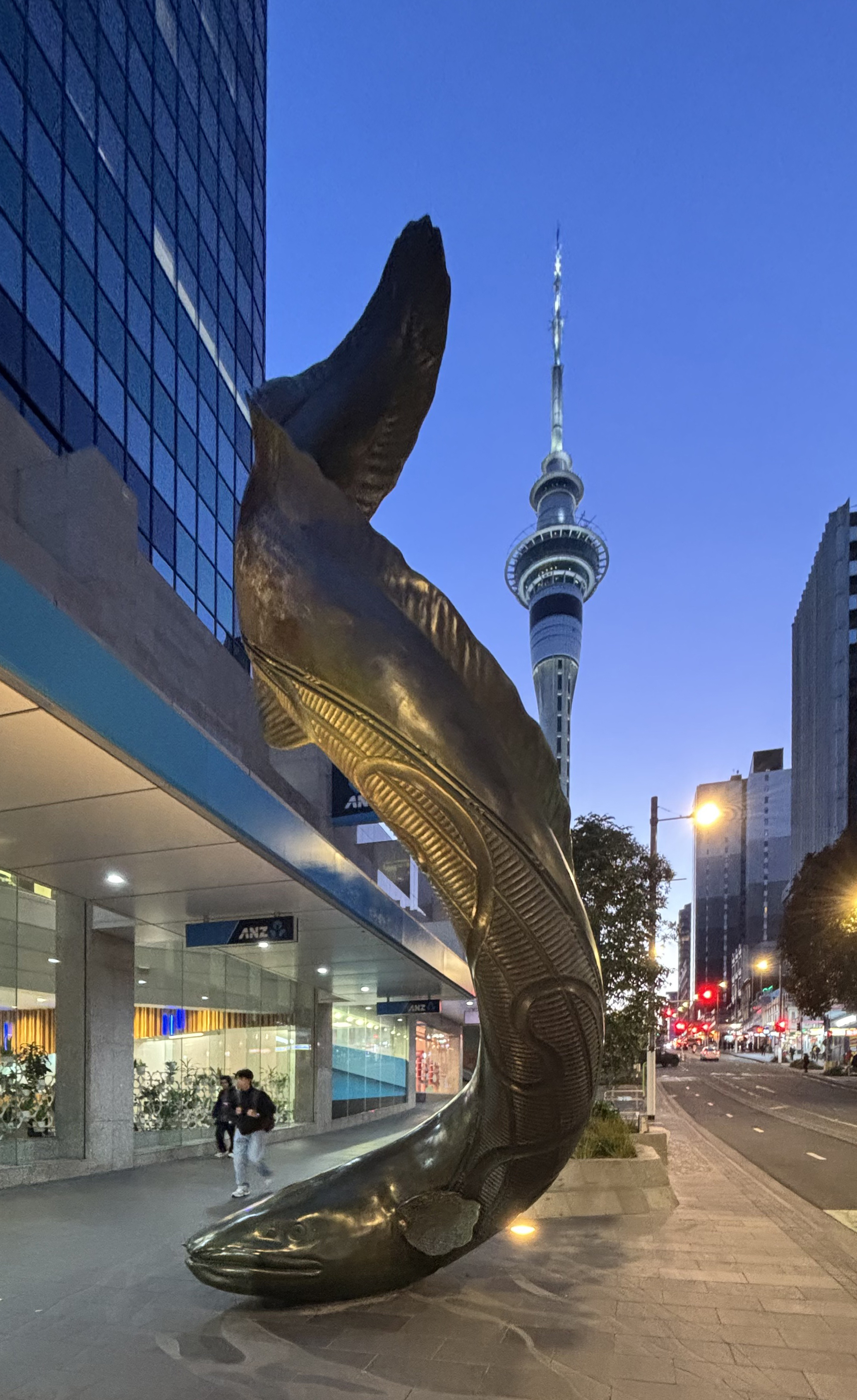
Horotiu (2026) on Victoria Street, Auckland, created with Sally Smith

Christopher Bailey (born 1965) is a New Zealand sculptor and carver.

== Background ==
Bailey is of Māori (Ngāti Porou, Ngāti Hako, Ngāti Pāoa, Te Aupōuri) and Irish descent. He studied Māori language and Māori material culture at the University of Auckland under Dante Bonica. He lives and works on Waiheke Island.

Gravitating towards the harder stones of basalt and granite, Bailey developed form driven stone works in a larger scale while also developing his carving skills working in tōtara alongside carvers of Piritahi Marae on Waiheke Island.

== Recognition ==
Bailey has exhibited both nationally and internationally, winning the 2014 Wallace Arts Trust New Zealand Sculptor Award for his Bondi Points at the Bondi Beach, Sculpture by the Sea. He has received financial support from Creative New Zealand to produce works. In 2010, Ringa Whao a documentary about Bailey's practice was produced by Rongo Productions. In 2011, he completed a public commission of carved pou situated outside Britomart Transport Centre in Auckland. Recognised for starting the pou (carved timber pallisade post) movement on Waiheke Island in recognition of the islands Māori history which saw other sculptors take up the art form in later years.

- Bondi Blades, Winner James Wallace Trust New Zealand Sculptor 2014 for Sculpture by the Sea Bondi, Australia
- Pou Tu Te Rangi, nominated for IAPA International Public Art Award for South East Asian Region, 2014
- Toi Iho, life time status granted in recognition of the quality of his stone work.

== Selected exhibitions ==
2017

- Headland Sculpture on the Gulf, Waiheke Island, New Zealand

2016

- Imago Mundi: New Zealand Collection exhibition, Treviso, Italy
- Sculpt Oneroa, Waiheke island, New Zealand

2015

- Sculpture by the Sea, Cottesloe Beach, Perth, Australia
- Show and Tell, Milford Galleries, Dunedin, New Zealand

2014

- Sculpture by the Sea, Bondi, Sydney, Australia
- Sculpture by the Sea, Cottesloe Beach, Perth, Australia
- Te Toi Hou – Contemporary Maori Art, Northart, Auckland, New Zealand

2013

- Sculpture by the Sea, Bondi Beach, Sydney, Australia
- Mini Masterworks 4, Spirit Wrestler Gallery, Canada
- Whatumanawa, Toi Gallery, Waiheke, New Zealand
- Auckland Art Fair, FHE Gallery, Auckland, New Zealand

2012

- From A Distance group show, NZ Academy of Fine Arts, Wellington, New Zealand
- Matariki, Toi Gallery, Waiheke, New Zealand
- The Review, Milford Galleries, Dunedin, New Zealand

2011

- Headland Sculpture on the Gulf, Waiheke Island, New Zealand

2010

- Moko Suite – Marti Freidlander/ Chris Bailey, FHE Galleries

2009

- Auckland Art Fair, Auckland, New Zealand
- 53rd Venice Biennale – La Maddalena, Venice, Italy
- NZ Room. Collaboration with Creative NZ. June – November
- 6x6 International Carving Symposium, Lake Serraia, Baselga de Pine, Italy, August
- Mini Masterworks III, Spirit Wrestler Gallery, Canada, October

2008

- Mana Whenua, The Lane Gallery, Auckland, March
- Mini Masterworks II, Spirit Wrestler Gallery, Canada, March
- Te Kahui o Matariki, group show and book launch
- Motuaarairoa Solo Show, FHE Galleries, Auckland, June
- Tiny Treasures, De Young Museum of Modern Art, San Francisco, USA
- Sculpture Onshore Sculpture Symposium, Takapuna, New Zealand, November

2007

- Maori Mark, The Wellington Event Centre, Wellington
- Mini Masterworks, Spirit Wrestler Gallery, Vancouver, Canada, August

2006

- Chris Bailey – New Works, Waiheke Community Art Gallery, January
- Art Out There Exhibition, Waiheke Island, Sculpture in the landscape
- Creative NZ Exhibition, Tokyo, Japan, November
- Pacific Edge 2006 The Art Bungalow, Kerikeri, February
- Taatai Tupuna, Matariki exhibition, Waiheke Community Art Gallery
- APEC, virtual exhibition, August 2006 – 2007

2005

- Toi Maori – The Eternal Thread Exhibition, Yerba Buena Centre for Arts, San Francisco, United States,
- Toi Iho Exhibition, Te Papa, NZ National Museum, New Zealand

== Selected commissions ==
- 2016—Kia Piritahi, Part of carving team to help complete the carvings of the traditional Maori meeting house/wharenui, Piritahi Marae, Waiheke, NZ
- 2014—Mata Kupenga, Public sculpture for Auckland City Council at Waiheke Public Library, Waiheke Island, Auckland.
- 2011—Pou Tu Te Rangi, Public sculptural installation for Britomart Art Trust, Britomart Precinct, Auckland, NZ
- 2010—Ringa Whao, film documentary biography on Chris Bailey.
- 2009—Commissioned by CNZ to provide works for the NZ Room, 53rd Venice Biennale – St Maddalena Church, Venice, Italy
