= Western Line (Auckland) =

Railway service in Auckland, New Zealand

- WEST
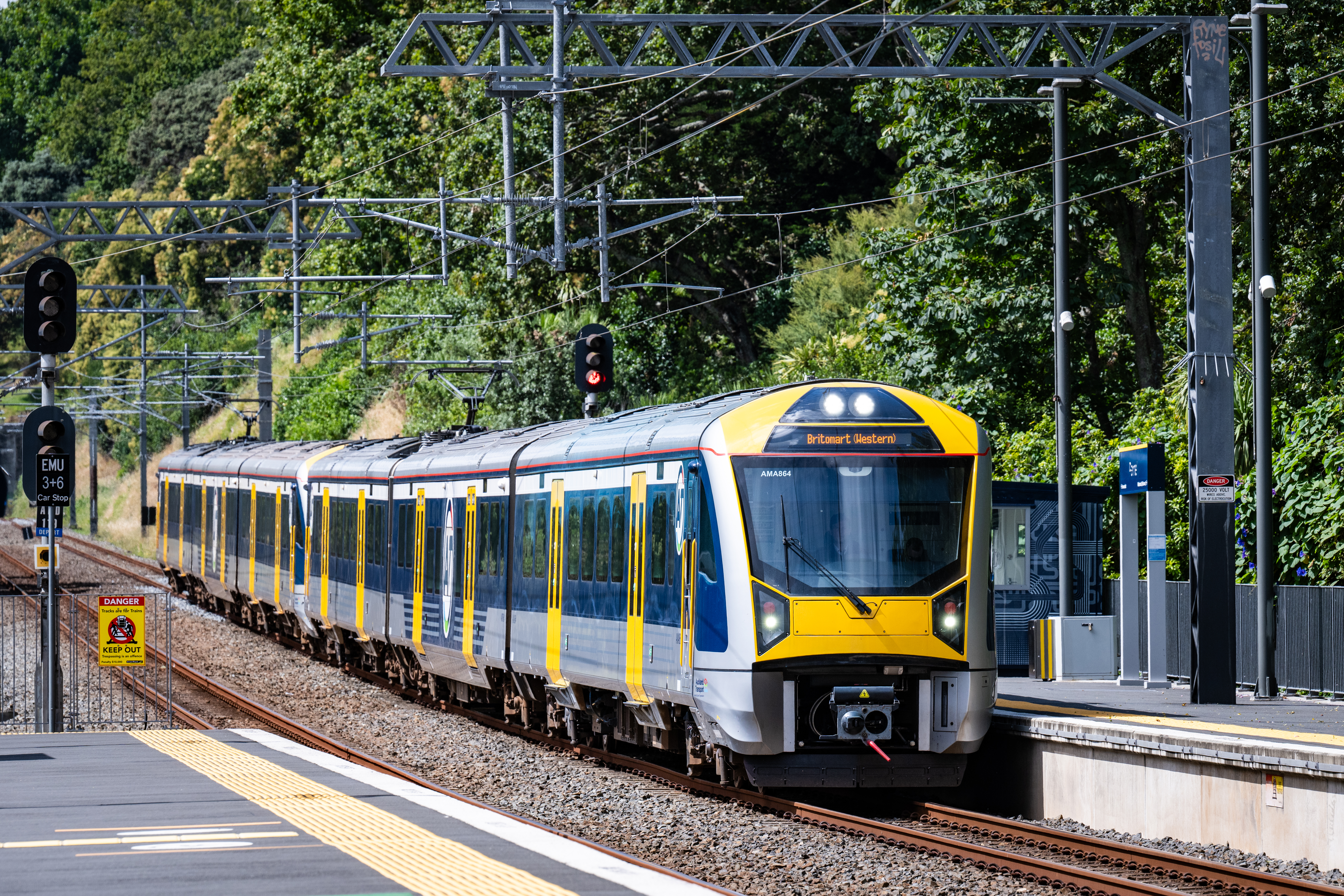
- Western Line train at Parnell

Overview
- Owner: KiwiRail (tracks and platforms); Auckland Transport (trains and buildings)
- Locale: Auckland
- Termini: Waitematā; Swanson
- Connecting lines: Eastern Line; Onehunga Line; Southern Line
- Stations: 18

Service
- Type: Commuter rail
- System: AT trains
- Operator: Auckland One Rail
- Rolling stock: AM class

History
- Closed: 13th September 2026

Technical
- Line length: 28 km (17 mi)
- Num of tracks: 2
- Track gauge: 1,067 mm (3 ft 6 in)
- Electrification: Overhead line, 25 kV 50 Hz AC

Map

The Western Line in Auckland, New Zealand, was the name given to suburban train services that operated between Waitematā and Swanson via Newmarket. Services were operated by Auckland One Rail under the Auckland Transport brand. The service has now merged with the Eastern Line, into the East-West line.

== Routing ==
From Waitematā to Newmarket, Western Line services traveled on the Newmarket Line, then followed the North Auckland Line to Swanson, the current westernmost station on the network.

The Western and Eastern Lines merged into the East West Line once the City Rail Link project was finished, with an additional service travelling on the former Western Line and then joining the Onehunga line bound for Onehunga.

== History ==
In 1877, New Zealand Railways called for tenders for the construction of a railway between Newmarket and Waikomiti (the former name of Glen Eden). Larkins and O'Brien were contracted to construct the rail line and a tunnel cutting through Scroggy Hill (located at modern-day Pleasant Road, West Coast Road and Rua Road). Locals in the area opposed the construction of a tunnel, leading to the railway being constructed over-top of the hill.

The Western Line to Glen Eden was completed in February 1880, and the Western Line stations between Newmarket and Glen Eden were opened on 27 March 1880: Mount Eden, Kingsland, Mount Albert, Avondale, New Lynn and Glen Eden. The line was extended to Henderson over the course of the year, and the Henderson railway station was opened on 21 December 1880.

In 1881, the line was extended to Helensville. This caused the closure of the Riverhead railway station and the Kumeu–Riverhead Section, a railway that was built in 1875 that connected Huapai/Kumeū to the port at Riverhead.

Scroggy Hill between Glen Eden and New Lynn posed a major issue for trains, as the gradient was too steep for many to traverse. Occasionally trains were forced to stop near the top of the hill and leave half their carriages behind; continuing on to Glen Eden and returning later for the second set of carriages. A ravine was cut through the hill during World War II.

By the early 20th century, an intensive suburban service ran between Auckland city centre and Henderson, with some mixed trains progressing to Helensville via Waitakere. When the mixed trains were withdrawn, Helensville became New Zealand's northernmost passenger terminus with a daily service to Auckland. However, in February 1980, the Minister of Railways, Colin McLachlan, announced it would be cancelled due to a lack of rolling stock. On 18 August 1980, a new timetable was implemented – it eliminated the Helensville service, with Waitakere becoming the new terminus. At the same time, the stations at Westbrook, Croydon Road, and St George's Street were closed to suburban traffic on a trial basis that was later made permanent.

ADK and ADL classes of diesel multiple units (DMUs) were purchased in 1993 to replace locomotive-hauled carriage trains. In 1997, as the DMUs stimulated increased patronage, work was undertaken by Auckland Regional Council to extend platforms so that longer trains could be accommodated. To enable more frequent services, construction began on 9 April 2004 to double track the line between Mount Eden and Morningside. When this new track entered service, a new timetable was introduced on 14 February 2005 with more frequent trains between Britomart and Waitakere, particularly during peak periods. This timetable also introduced short run services between Britomart and New Lynn. This was followed by the opening of a new double platform Kingsland station on 21 May 2005, replacing the old single platform station. Further patronage growth meant that on 25 October 2005, another new timetable was implemented and it featured the re-introduction of features that had been absent for many years, including express services from Waitakere to Britomart on weekdays and Sunday trains between Britomart and New Lynn. The weekday service frequency to Swanson was cut to 37 minutes, but this meant trains to Waitakere ran only every 74 minutes.

=== Helensville trial ===
Beyond Waitakere, services between Auckland and Helensville resumed in July 2008 on a trial basis, with a minimum of forty passengers daily required for the train to be permanently reinstated, but the service was terminated again in December 2009, because an average of only 43 passengers per day used the three daily services, requiring a much above-average subsidy.

=== Double-tracking ===
The first section of the duplication had been undertaken by Auckland Regional Council, as 'Project Boston', adding 2.2 km of double track between Boston Road Station and Morningside Station by February 2005.

In May 2005, work began to prepare the rail corridor between New Lynn and Henderson for double tracking and construction of the double track commenced on 31 December 2005. On 19 December 2006, the central government approved a NZ$120 million package for double trackage in the other direction from New Lynn to Avondale; this included a 1 km long, 8 m deep trench through the centre of New Lynn for which construction began in 2009.

On 8 June 2010, the double tracking of the Western Line was completed, enabling trains to run in both directions on one of two tracks all the way between Britomart Transport Centre in the Auckland CBD and Swanson station in Waitakere. The double-tracking cost $420 million and employed around 400 people. The last section was a 3 km stretch between Avondale Station and Titirangi Road in New Lynn. The station opened in September 2010.

From the completion of the electrification of Auckland's suburban network in July 2015, services ceased on the non-electrified section of track between Waitakere and Swanson stations and were replaced by buses. This made Swanson the current northwestern terminus on the Western Line, as considering the low passenger numbers at Waitakere Station, increasing the height in the Waitakere Tunnel was not considered justified. Waitakere Village is now served by bus services connecting to Swanson and Henderson.

=== Additional station ===
On 12 March 2017, Parnell Station was opened to Western Line services. Westfield station on the Eastern and Southern Lines closed on the same day.

== Replacement ==
From the opening of the City Rail Link on 13 September 2026, the Western Line merged with the Eastern Line to form the East West Line, connecting Swanson to Manukau via Waitemāta and the CRL tunnels.

== Services ==
Suburban services were operated by Auckland One Rail under the Auckland Transport brand.

== Stations ==
Stations on the Western Line
| Distance from Waitematā | Name | Opened | Notes |
| 0.00 km (0.00 mi) | Waitematā^{H} | 7 July 2003 | |
| 2 km (1.24 mi) | Parnell | 12 March 2017 | Services initially stopped at this station in weekday evenings and at weekends only. From 26 August 2018, it became a stop for all services. |
| 3.84 km (2.39 mi) | Newmarket^{H} | 20 December 1873 | |
| | Grafton | 9 April 2010 | Replaced the nearby Boston Rd Station. |
| 6.44 km (4.00 mi) | Maungawhau | 29 March 1880 | Closed until the latter half of 2026 for redevelopment of the City Rail Link construction. |
| | Kingsland | 29 March 1880 | Rebuild on 26 September 2004 Reopened on 1 February 2005 |
| | Morningside | 29 March 1880 | |
| 10.09 km (6.27 mi) | Baldwin Avenue | 28 September 1953 | |
| 11.12 km (6.91 mi) | Mount Albert | 29 March 1880 | Platform rebuilt and upgraded and pedestrian walkways opened in 2-stage programme 2012–2016. |
| | Avondale | 29 March 1880 | Original station replaced with a temporary facility on 19 January 2009 pending completion of new station. Reopened on 8 June 2010. |
| 15.55 km (9.66 mi) | New Lynn^{H} | 29 March 1880 | Original station closed on 28 June 1986. New station opened in 1984 and replaced with temporary facility on 4 May 2009 pending completion of trench. Current station opened on 24 Sep 2010. |
| 16.66 km (10.35 mi) | Fruitvale Road | 28 September 1953 | |
| 18.46 km (11.47 mi) | Glen Eden | 29 March 1880 | |
| 20.77 km (12.91 mi) | Sunnyvale | 28 February 1924 | |
| 22.39 km (13.91 mi) | Henderson^{H} | 21 December 1880 | Rebuilt on 24 October 2006. Reopened on 2 November 2006. |
| 23.86 km (14.83 mi) | Sturges Road | 30 April 1934 | |
| 25.71 km (15.98 mi) | Rānui | 16 November 1925 | |
| 28 km (17.40 mi) | Swanson | 18 July 1881 | Terminus for electric unit services. Platform replaced in 2000. |

== See also ==
- Public transport in Auckland
- List of Auckland railway stations
