= Fruitvale Road railway station =

Train station in Auckland, New Zealand

Fruitvale Road
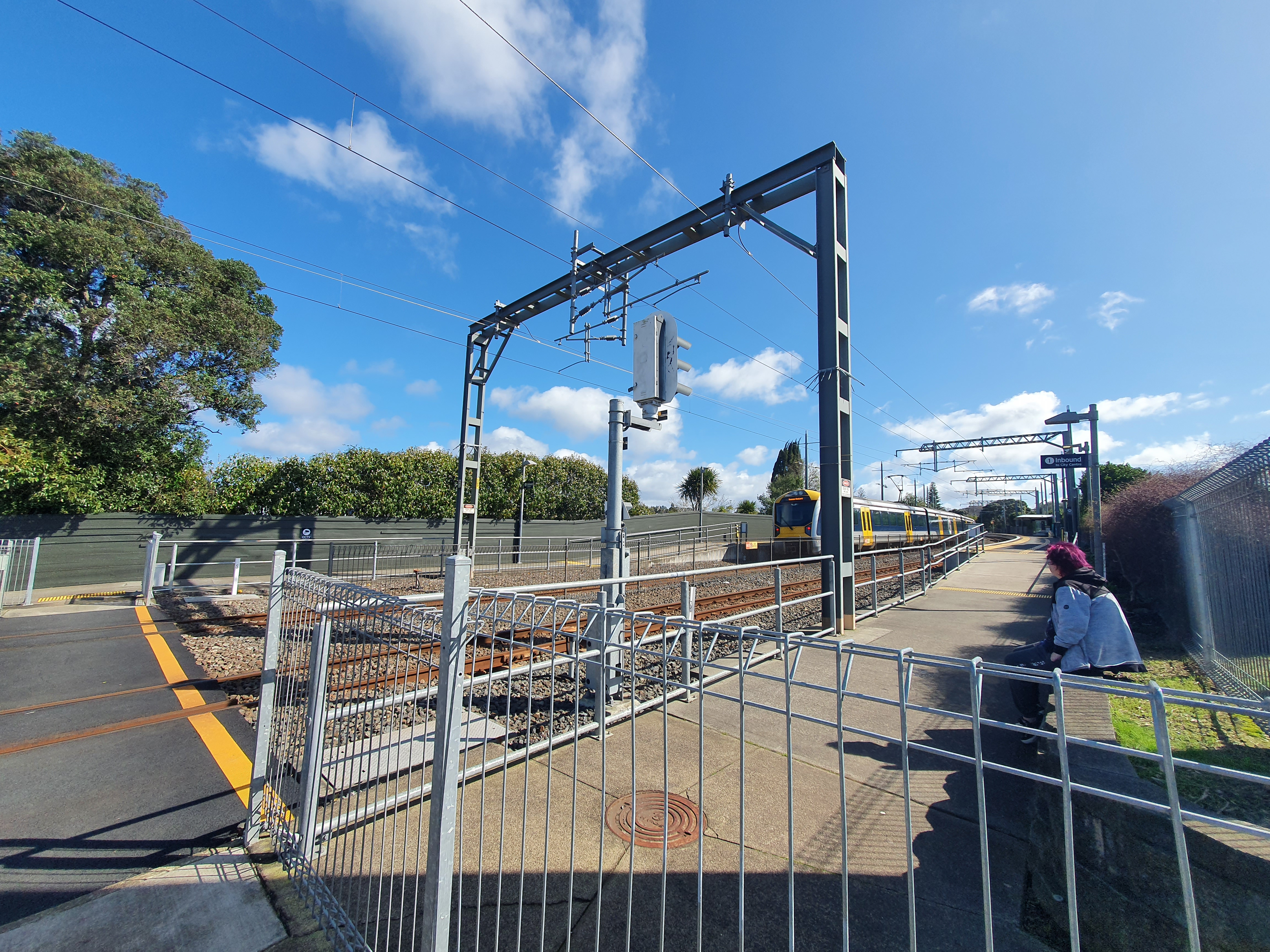

General information
- Location: Kelston, Auckland
- Coordinates: 36.9107°S 174.6671°E
- System: Auckland Transport Urban rail
- Owner: KiwiRail (track and platforms); Auckland Transport (buildings)
- Operator: Auckland One Rail
- Line: Western Line
- Platforms: Side platforms (P1 & P2)
- Tracks: Mainline (2)

Construction
- Platform levels: 1
- Parking: No
- Cycle facilities: No
- Accessible: Yes

Other information
- Station code: FRD
- Fare zone: Waitākere

History
- Opened: 28 September 1953
- Electrified: 20 July 2015

Passengers
- 2009: 808 passengers/day

Services
| Preceding station | Auckland Transport (Auckland One Rail) | Following station |
|---|---|---|
| Glen Eden towards Swanson | East West Line | New Lynn towards Manukau |
| Glen Eden towards Henderson | Onehunga West Line | New Lynn towards Onehunga |
Location

Fruitvale Road railway station is on the East West and Onehunga West Lines of the Auckland railway network. It is near local schools, including two major high schools.

The station was opened on 28 September 1953.

In 2006–2007, the station was closed over summer to be upgraded, and lengthened for 6-car trains.

The station is known as the final confirmed place of missing French teenager Eloi Rolland, who went missing from Piha on 7 March 2020.

== Station name ==
It is named after a nearby road. The road is not very well known, thus new passengers will most likely have no idea which suburb this station serves. It has been proposed to rename it 'Kelston' since it is in that suburb. It is quite close to Kelston Shopping Centre, Kelston Girls' College and Kelston Deaf Education Centre.

== Services ==
East West and Onehunga West Line suburban train services are provided by Auckland One Rail on behalf of Auckland Transport.

== See also ==
- List of Auckland railway stations
