= New Zealand AM class electric multiple unit =

Electric commuter trains operating in Auckland, New Zealand

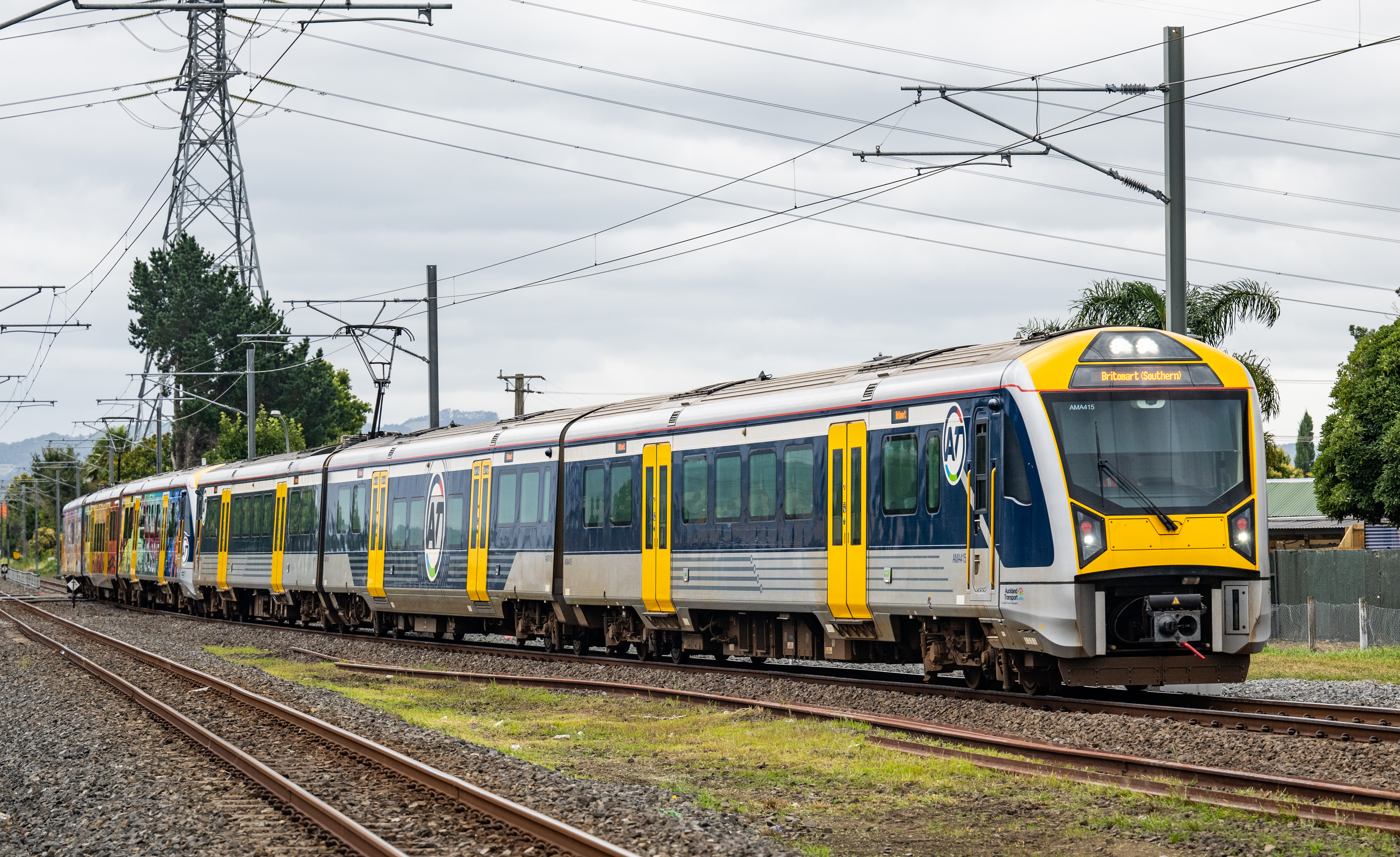
- AM 415 passing through Takanini

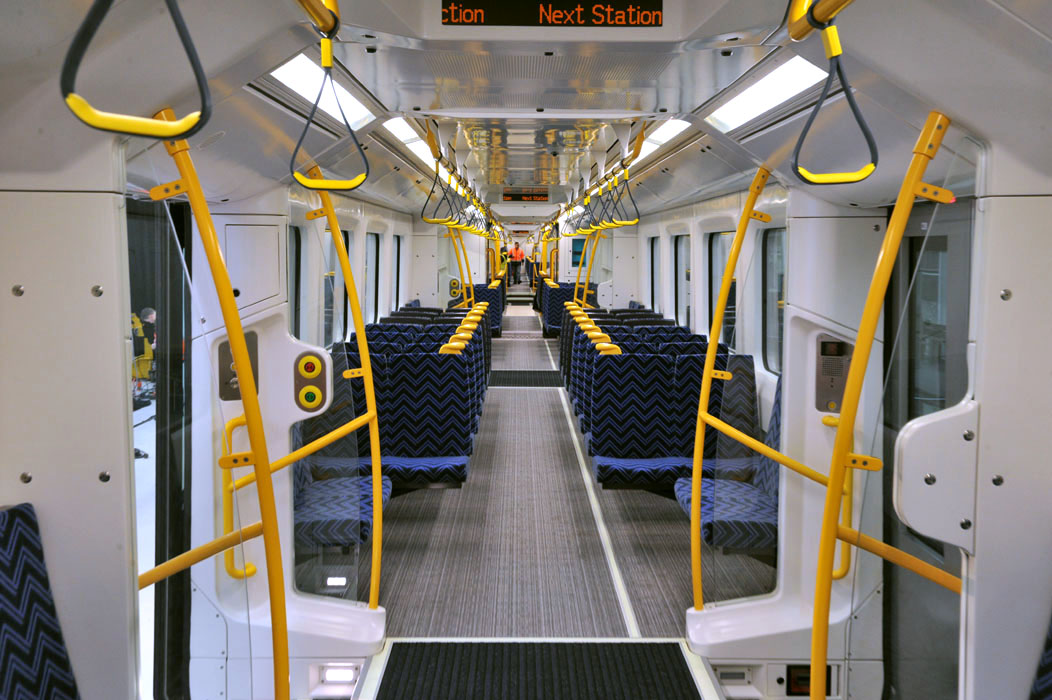
- Interior
- In service: 28 April 2014–present
- Manufacturer: CAF
- Built at: Beasain, Spain (Batches 1 & 2); Huehuetoca, Mexico (Batch 3)
- Family name: CxK
- Replaced: ADK class DMU; ADL class DMU; SA carriage; SX carriage; DC class loco; DFT class loco
- Constructed: 2013–2015 (Batch 1); 2019–2020 (Batch 2); 2022–2026 (Batch 3)
- Number built: 95
- Number in service: 95
- Formation: 3 cars (AMA–AMT–AMP) per set
- Fleet numbers: 103–714; 810–973; 1005–1249
- Capacity: 373 (230 seated, 143 standing)
- Operators: Transdev Auckland (2014–2022); Auckland One Rail (2022–)
- Depots: Henderson; Papakura; Pukekohe; The Strand; Wiri
- Lines served: East West Line; Onehunga West Line; South City Line

Specifications
- Car body construction: Stainless steel
- Train length: 72.03 m (236 ft 4 in)
- Car length: 24.3 m (79 ft 9 in) (AMA/AMP); 23.2 m (76 ft 1 in) (AMT)
- Width: 2.76 m (9 ft 1 in)
- Height: 3.99 m (13 ft 1 in) (over lowered pantograph)
- Floor height: 1,100 mm (3 ft 7 in) (high floor); 750 mm (2 ft 6 in) (AMT low floor)
- Platform height: 750 mm (2 ft 6 in)
- Doors: 4 × twin doors (2 per side) per car, push-button opening
- Wheel diameter: 860–790 mm (34–31 in) (new–worn)
- Maximum speed: 110 km/h (70 mph) 121 km/h (75 mph) for testing purposes
- Weight: 132 t (130 long tons; 146 short tons) (tare 3-car set)
- Traction system: CAF IGBT–VVVF
- Traction motors: 8 × Mitsubishi Electric MB-5146-A 190 kW (255 hp)
- Power output: 1,520 kW (2,038 hp)
- Gear ratio: 6.8 : 1 (102 / 15)
- Acceleration: 1 m/s^{2} (3.3 ft/s^{2})
- Deceleration: 1 m/s^{2} (3.3 ft/s^{2})
- Electric system: 25 kV 50 Hz AC overhead catenary
- Current collection: Pantograph
- UIC classification: Bo′Bo′+2′2′+Bo′Bo′
- Safety system: ETCS (to application level 1)
- Coupling system: Scharfenberg
- Multiple working: Within class only
- Track gauge: 1,067 mm (3 ft 6 in)

Notes/references
- Sourced from except where noted. Testing operation speed referenced from: "Passenger Vehicle Operations Manual" (PDF). KiwiRail. 4 March 2026. Section 4.4.1 AM Class Restrictions – Speeds.

The New Zealand AM class of electric multiple unit (EMU) was constructed for the electrification of Auckland's railway network. The class was introduced in 2014 with the first unit having arrived in September 2013. The units are classified AM (Auckland Metro), with the driving motor car with pantograph classified AMP, the middle trailer car AMT and the driving motor car without pantograph AMA. The trains are operated by Auckland One Rail for Auckland Transport under the AT Metro brand.

== History ==
=== Procurement ===
In February 2010, an "industry engagement document" preceding the formal call for tenders was published, calling for 114 EMU cars in 38 three-car sets, capable of being coupled as six-car trains, the maximum Auckland's stations can handle. The tender also included 13 electric locomotives (which did not eventuate). The sets would have seated around 240 passengers. While the document specified only a small number of elements, it required a speed of 110 km/h for fully laden trains, a minimum design life of 35 years and the ability to climb the steep grades of the proposed City Rail Link. The expected value of the contract was approximately $500 million.

In December 2010, there was concern that government handling of the tender could be placing the process into doubt, with four tenderers out of the ten shortlisted having withdrawn. One of them, Bombardier Transportation, criticised the government for initially shortlisting four companies then extending it to ten, which in their view created a lack of confidence in the tendering process. Another criticism was that KiwiRail had "effectively prevented" their facilities in Hillside and Lower Hutt from tendering for the contract or parts of the contract, settling for encouraging overseas tenderers to include some local component. This, together with the refusal to allow local manufacturing to build railway wagons, was seen by groups such as unions and newspaper commenters as a sign that KiwiRail/the Government was unwilling to support New Zealand rail manufacturing.

In April 2011, it was confirmed that the shortlist had been reduced to two – Construcciones y Auxiliar de Ferrocarriles (CAF) and Hyundai Rotem – with the contract expected to be awarded several months later. Still uncertain was ownership of the trains, with Auckland Transport preferring to take ownership rather than KiwiRail. The Rail & Maritime Transport Union favoured this course, as it would have ensured that they could not be sold by the government at a later stage. Auckland Council transport committee chairman Mike Lee noted that it would be inappropriate that Auckland would be expected to pay back a government loan for the trains (unlike recent Wellington train purchases), yet could end up not owning the trains.

In August 2011, it was confirmed that the tender specification had been changed to 57 three-car EMUs (approximately 50% more than before) and no locomotives, reducing long-term maintenance costs. All trains would be able to use the City Rail Link, which might not have been possible for locomotive-hauled carriages as they would not have met performance and fire rating requirements. The purchase price included a 12-year maintenance contract. On the funding side, after long negotiations between Auckland Council/Auckland Transport and the government, it was declared that the trains would be owned by Auckland, with Auckland paying approximately half of the cost from rates, as well as paying annual track access charges to KiwiRail and any potential purchase price increases as the winning tenderer was finalised.

=== Contract award and construction ===
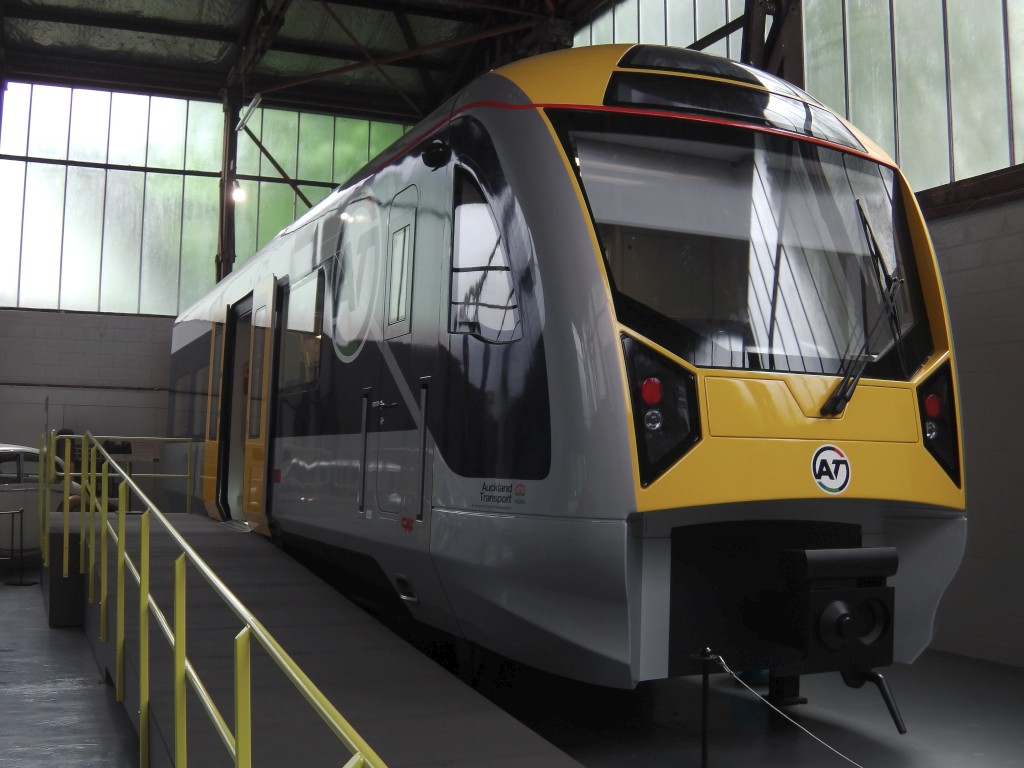
Exterior of mockup, Museum of Transport & Technology.

On 6 October 2011, it was announced that Spanish rolling stock builder CAF had been selected. Further information regarding the trains was also released, including artist's impressions resembling the Class 4000 DMUs for NI Railways, built by CAF.

A mock-up was unveiled in June 2012, and was on display at the Museum of Transport & Technology. The mock-up was a hybrid of the motor car and trailer sections – the actual layout is different, with greater length in each section.

Production of the first unit was underway in October 2012. In mid 2013, it was announced that the first train had been shipped, and was to arrive in Auckland by September 2013. It arrived at the Ports of Auckland on 24 August 2013.

The class was designed with the City Rail Link in mind, which has extended the underground operation of the 57 units considerably.

=== Further orders ===
AT looked into the possibility of battery electric multiple units (BEMU) to operate services between Papakura and Pukekohe as an interim measure prior to electrifying the North Island Main Trunk between the two stations. It was thought that up to 13 2-Car BEMUs would be required (allowing for either 6x 3-Car BEMU per hour or 3x 6-Car BEMU with one spare). In November 2017, it was announced that the proposed 13-unit BEMU order had been cancelled in preference for 15 further AM class units. The rationale for this became clear in late April 2018 when electrification between Papakura and Pukekohe was announced as part of the $28 billion Auckland Transport Alignment Project. The 15 units were under construction mid 2019 with the first unit (AM810) shipped from the factory in Spain in early September. The first of the three-carriage trains arrived in Auckland in October and should enter service in December after commissioning. The last of the additional fleet of 15 arrived in Auckland during July 2020.

In January 2022, a third batch of trains was ordered from CAF, with 23 units to be included in this batch. The first 3 units arrived in 2024, with AM1005 being the first to enter service in February 2025. As of 19 December 2025, AM1210 is in service which leaves all but three of the Batch 3 AM class EMUs remaining to enter service. At this time (22 December 2025) there are 20 out of 23 Batch 3 AMs in service following AM1210 coming into revenue service earlier in the month.

In February 2025, AM836 was taken out of service and converted into a test train for the City Rail Link. This included modifications to the train's width and the installation of cameras and sensors. On 12 February 2025, it became the first AM-class train to travel through the City Rail Link tunnel. It is expected to rejoin the fleet after 9 months of testing in the City Rail Link.

== Introduction ==
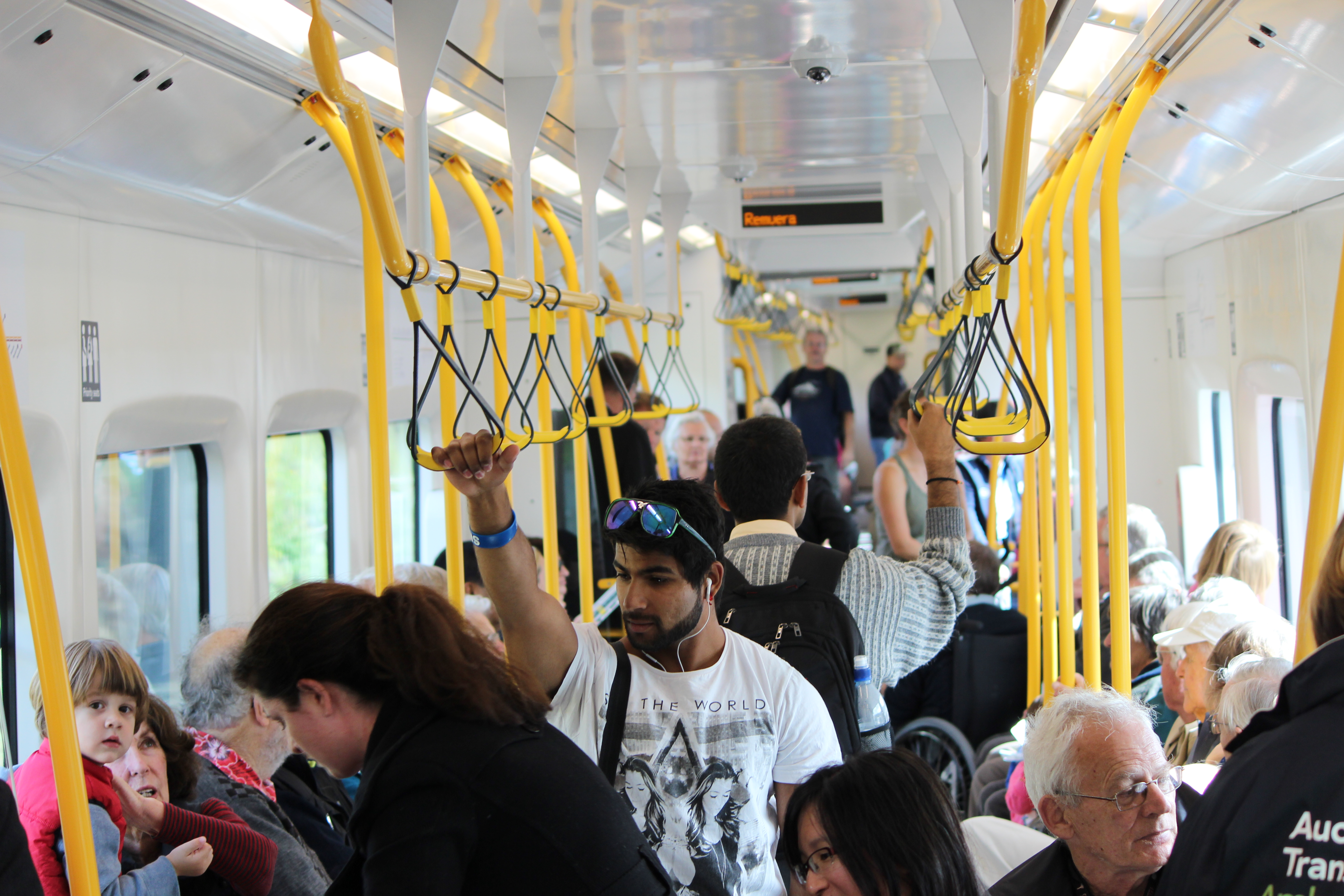
Inside an AM on the first day of revenue service in April 2014

The first unit was transferred to the purpose-built Wiri depot on 26 August 2013. It was certified at the depot before being officially unveiled on 12 September.

The next units arrived in Auckland in November 2013, with two sets due to arrive every month December 2013 – November 2014, four each month December 2014 – July 2015.

The first revenue service ran on 28 April 2014 on the Onehunga Line, following a public open day the preceding day on which the trains were used to run free shuttle services between Britomart and Newmarket. Electric Eastern Line services commenced on 15 September 2014 as far as Manukau; Eastern Line services to Papakura were diverted to terminate at Manukau from 8 December 2014, completing the Eastern Line electrification.

Electric Southern Line services to Papakura commenced on 15 January 2015, running two return off-peak services on weekdays. From 16 May 2015, all weekend services, with the exception of the shuttle service between Papakura and Pukekohe were operated by electric trains, including the Western Line.

Electric trains were fully introduced into daily services across the Auckland electrified rail network on 20 July 2015. Electric trains operate as far as Swanson on the Western Line and as far as Pukekohe on the Southern Line.

== Accidents ==
On 29 January 2015, a pedestrian was struck by a train and killed at Morningside station whilst attempting to cross at a pedestrian level crossing.

The leading three cars of an inbound six car train derailed in the Britomart tunnel on the approach to the platforms on 9 May 2018 and stopped millimetres from a concrete wall. The emergency brakes were activated and no injuries were recorded. The derailed units took several days to clear. The TAIC investigation found that a manufacturing defect in a rail caused the rail to fracture.

On 4 April 2025, an Onehunga Line train collided with a car at the Maurice Road level crossing in Penrose, killing the sole occupant.

On 2 February 2026, an Eastern Line train was routed onto a section of unelectrified track near Middlemore station, damaging the overhead line and the train's pantograph and stranding the passengers on board.

On 09 September 2026, a student died at Baldwin Avenue railway station near Mount Albert, after a train hit him .

On 23 October 2026, a woman died after being struck by a train whilst attempting to cross at a pedestrian crossing between Henderson railway Station and Sturges Road railway station, causing disruptions to the East West line with services being canceled between Henderson railway station, and Swanson railway station for the day.
