= Glen Eden railway station =

Train station in Auckland, New Zealand

Glen Eden
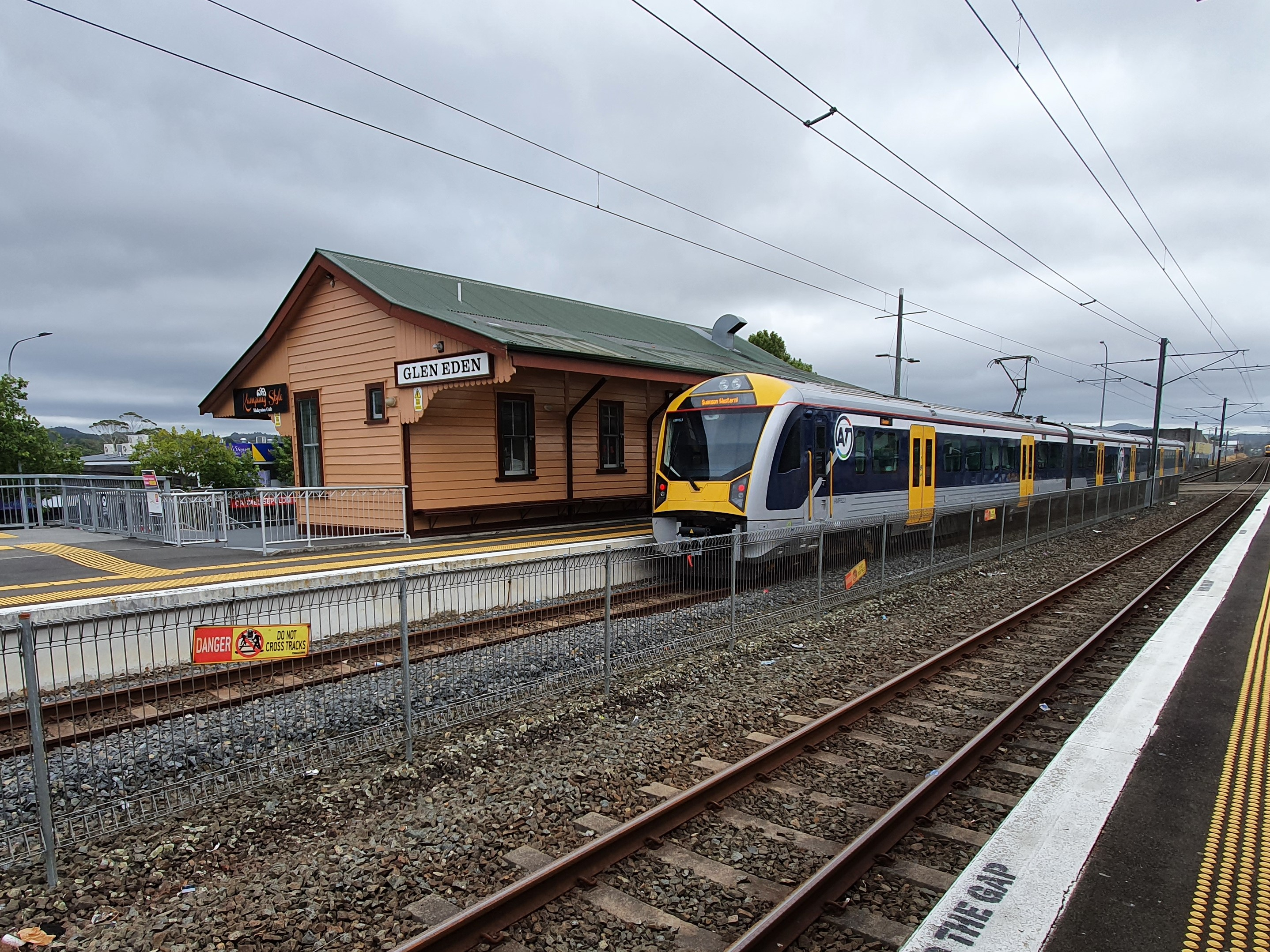

General information
- Location: Glen Eden, Auckland
- Coordinates: 36.9103°S 174.6533°E
- System: Auckland Transport Urban rail
- Owner: KiwiRail (track and platforms); Auckland Transport (buildings)
- Operator: Auckland One Rail
- Line: Western Line
- Platforms: Side platforms (P1 & P2)
- Tracks: Mainline (2)

Construction
- Platform levels: 1
- Parking: Yes
- Cycle facilities: Yes
- Accessible: Yes

Other information
- Station code: GLE
- Fare zone: Waitākere

History
- Opened: 29 March 1880
- Electrified: 20 July 2015

Passengers
- 2009: 1,543 passengers/day

Services
Preceding station	Auckland Transport (Auckland One Rail)	Following station
Sunnyvale towards Swanson	East West Line	Fruitvale Road towards Manukau
Sunnyvale towards Henderson	Onehunga West Line	Fruitvale Road towards Onehunga
Location

Glen Eden railway station is located on the East West and Onehunga West lines of the AT Metro rail network in Auckland, New Zealand. The station building is a local historical landmark, and was restored and relocated from the eastern to the western side of the railway corridor in 2001. A restaurant is currently located in the old station building.

== History ==
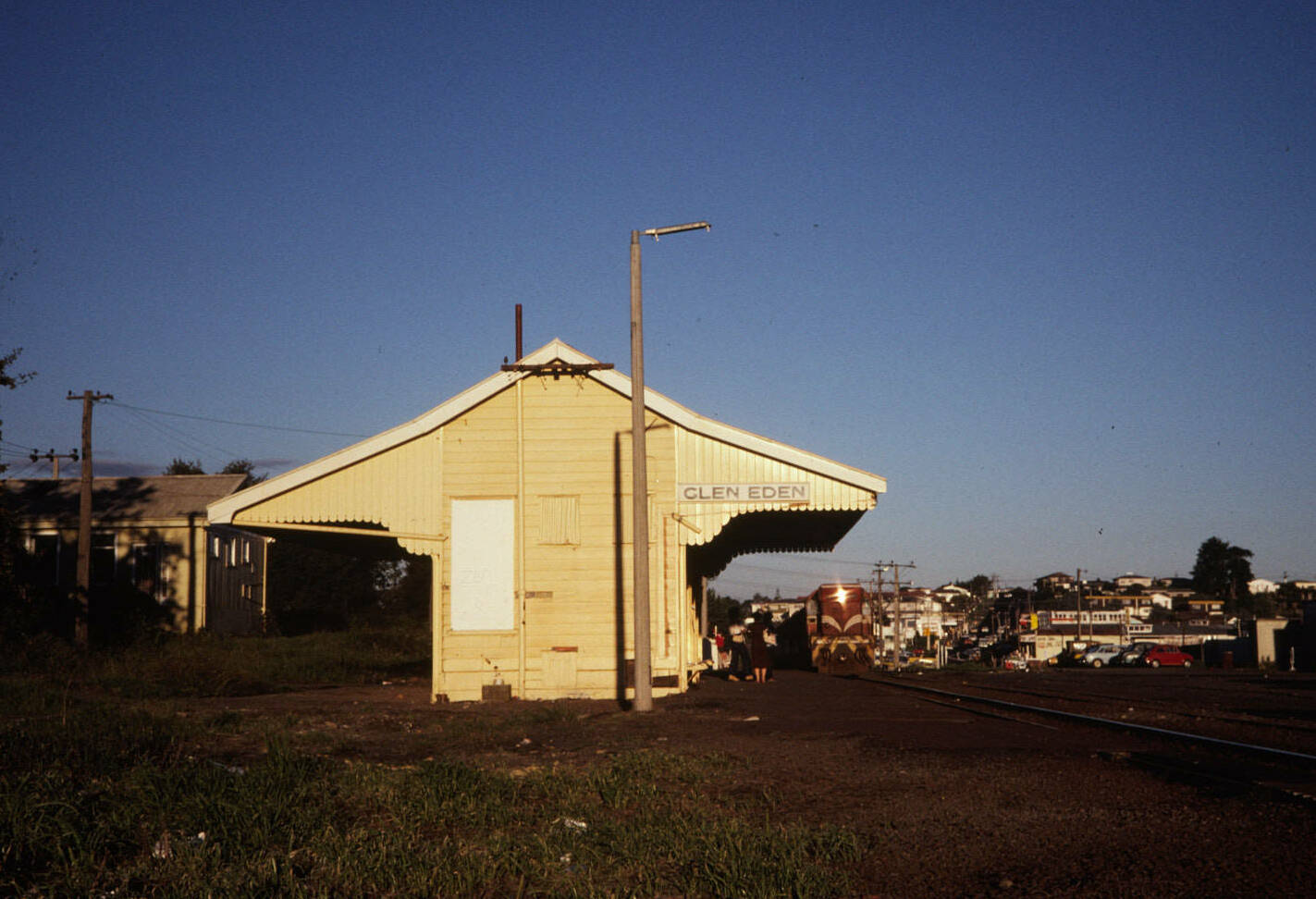
Glen Eden railway station in 1979

The station was opened on 29 March 1880 as one of the original stations on the North Auckland Line. The station's location determined the placement of the nearby Waikumete Cemetery. Special trains ran from Auckland on Sundays carrying the deceased and their entourage, and a dedicated platform was constructed to serve these trains.

This unique original function is one of the reasons that the station is registered by Heritage New Zealand as a Category II heritage building. The station building was added to the New Zealand Historic Places Trust register on 30 October 1998, with register number 7435.

The train station was the centre of the Glen Eden community during the turn of the century, with most stores and services located adjacent to the station. The station habitually dealt with scrub fires, caused due to sparks from the locomotive engines and the adjacent Archibald's Sawmill. The Waikumete Cemetery was opened in 1886, due to its proximity to the train station. The station became a transportation hub for Waitākere Ranges holidaymakers, who would take coaches from the train station to holiday at guest houses located in places such as Waiatarua, Karekare and Piha.

== Station buildings ==
Glen Eden's station building was completed in February 1880 as a simple rectangular-plan building with a pitched roof, subsequently altered to a ridged roof with gable ends. Verandahs were added to each frontage in 1929 and 1940, giving the building its current form. The second and later verandah faced what was then the road frontage onto Waikumete Road, in preparation for a branch line that did not eventuate.

The station building narrowly escaped removal in 1995, when its sale was overturned following the discovery that New Zealand Railways Corporation had donated the building to the Glen Eden Borough Council in 1983. The Glen Eden Railway Station Restoration Trust (Incorporated) was subsequently formed, purchased the building from the council, and began restoration work in 1999.

On 7 October 2001, the trust relocated the restored station building from its original location on the eastern side of the railway corridor, adjacent to Waikumete Cemetery, across the corridor and approximately 200 metres south to its current site on West Coast Road. The building was rotated through 180 degrees to face the correct frontage onto the railway platform as originally built.

Ownership of the building was transferred from the trust to the former Waitakere City Council in 2006. The trust currently holds a community lease from the Waitākere Ranges Local Board, including permission to sublease the building as a restaurant/cafe. Proceeds from the sublease support the trust's maintenance of the building in line with its New Zealand Historic Places Trust classification.

Glen Eden station's signal box, located near the original station building site off Waikumete Road, was sold in the 1970s and relocated to Muriwai.

== Services ==
East West and Onehunga West line suburban train services are provided by Auckland One Rail on behalf of Auckland Transport.

Bus routes 15, 17, 151, and 152 pass by the station on the adjacent West Coast Road.

The Glen Eden level crossing adjacent to the station halts road traffic and there have been local requests e.g. in 2025 for the crossing to be removed or upgraded.

== See also ==
- List of Auckland railway stations
- Public transport in Auckland
