= New Lynn railway station =

Train station in Auckland, New Zealand

New Lynn
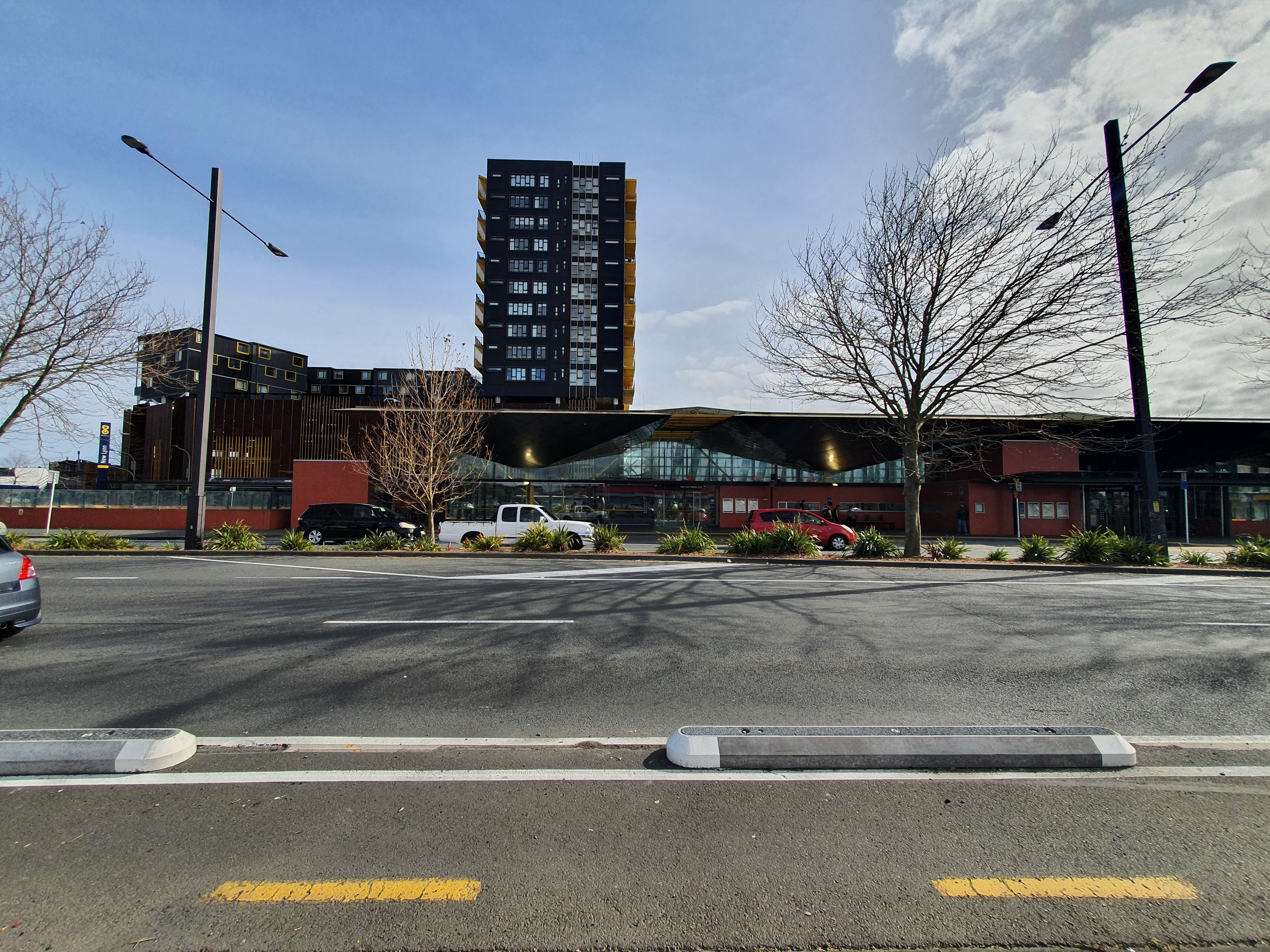
- The New Lynn railway station in 2022

General information
- Location: New Lynn, Auckland; New Zealand
- Coordinates: 36.90939°S 174.68408°E
- System: Auckland Transport Urban rail
- Owner: KiwiRail (track and platforms); Auckland Transport (buildings)
- Operator: Auckland One Rail
- Line: North Auckland Line
- Distance: 19.49 km (12.11 mi) from Westfield Junction
- Platforms: Island platform (P1 & P2)
- Tracks: Mainline (2)

Construction
- Parking: Yes
- Cycle facilities: Yes
- Accessible: Yes (Lifts)

Other information
- Station code: NLY
- Fare zone: Isthmus/Waitākere (overlap)

History
- Opened: 29 March 1880
- Rebuilt: 2008–2010
- Electrified: 20 July 2015

Passengers
- CY 2018: 1,520,640

Services
Preceding station	Auckland Transport (Auckland One Rail)	Following station
Fruitvale Road towards Swanson	East West Line	Avondale towards Manukau
Fruitvale Road towards Henderson	Onehunga West Line	Avondale towards Onehunga
Location

New Lynn railway station is on the East West line and Onehunga West line of the Auckland railway network, New Zealand, and is part of an integrated transport centre where transfers can be made to and from bus services. A redeveloped station in a new rail trench was opened on 25 September 2010. LynnMall, a major shopping mall, is close by.

== History ==
- March 1880: Opens as one of the original stations on the North Auckland Line.
- March 1983: The Auckland Regional Authority decides to relocate the station east, to the other side of the Rankin Avenue-Totara Avenue-Clark Street road intersection and adjacent to the bus station, despite the uncertain future of Auckland suburban services.
- August 1987: The old station building is demolished after vandals broke in and damaged it.
- December 2006: Double-tracking between New Lynn and Avondale is approved by the central government; the $120 million package includes a 1 km long, 8m deep trench to carry the tracks, and a new station with below-ground platforms. Trenching the tracks means that they will no longer pass directly through the Rankin Avenue-Totara Avenue-Clark Street road intersection, removing a source of traffic congestion and the potential for collisions.
- March 2008: The station platform is demolished and a temporary platform constructed to make way for the rail trench earthworks.
- 1 March 2010: Trains begin running in the trench on a single track.
- 29 April 2010: The first steam train runs in the trench, Ja 1275 on the Northlander to Whangārei.
- 8 June 2010: Trains begin running through the trench on two tracks, completing the Western Line Double Tracking Project.
- 24 September 2010: The station is officially opened by the Governor-General Sir Anand Satyanand.
- April–June 2012: The station shelters are transformed and a glass encased stairwell shelter is put into place due to high patronage use.

== Rail trench ==
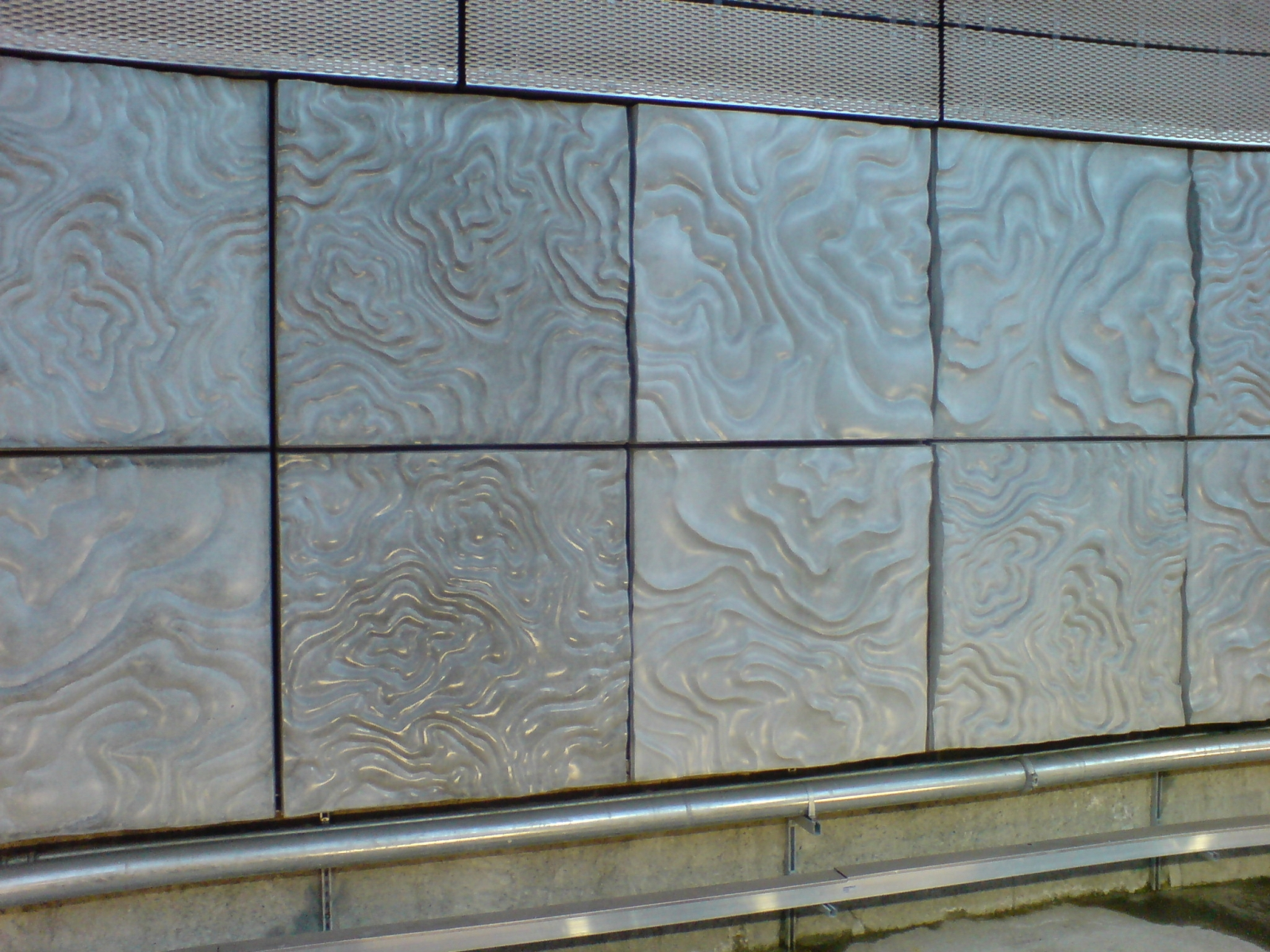
New Lynn Rail Corridor, a relief sculpture by Louise Purvis

In the late 2000s, local and regional government, as part of the revitalising of the regional rail commuter network, decided to build a new "feature station" at New Lynn, which included sinking the tracks and station into a trench. Road was grade-separated from rail to enable vehicle traffic to pass over the line. Before the trenching works, the level crossings in the town centre were often blocked by passing trains, leading to substantial road congestion, which would have only increased with more train services.

The new rail trench and associated sunken station were to be constructed with up to 16m deep diaphragm walls using specially imported cranes and specialists. This was required due to the unstable, water-logged soils and the need to avoid settlement damage to close by buildings. The procedure to construct the 1 km of trench (with finished depth of up to 8m) involved multiple temporary shifts of the railway line and of various associated roads, and was called the most difficult part of the DART railway development programme in Auckland. Wet ground conditions had also forced a redesign of the trench methods, and delayed the project start by six months.

== Services ==
East West and Onehunga West lines suburban train services are provided by Auckland One Rail on behalf of Auckland Transport.

Bus routes 14, 15, 17, 18, 22N, 24B, 24R, 67A, 67B, 67X, 68, 149, 151, 152, 161, 162, 170, 171, 171X, 186, 191, 195, 223, 243, and 249 travel to the bus-train interchange at New Lynn, directly adjacent to the station.

== See also ==
- List of Auckland railway stations
- Public transport in Auckland
