= Sunnyvale railway station =

Train station in Auckland, New Zealand

Sunnyvale
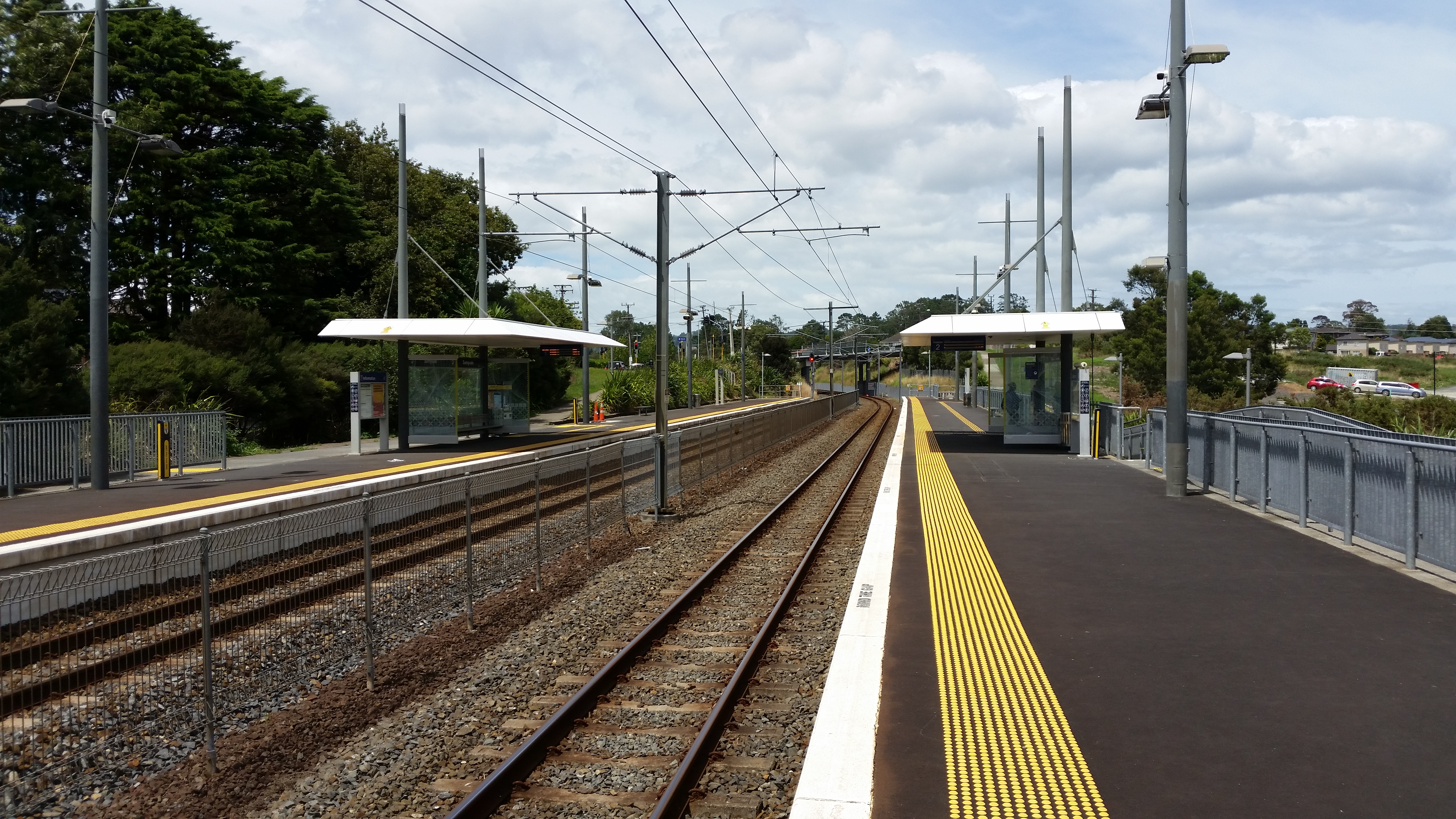
- The station in January 2018, looking southbound from the northbound platform

General information
- Location: Sunnyvale, West Auckland
- Coordinates: 36°53.8′S 174°37.9′E
- System: Auckland Transport Urban rail
- Owner: KiwiRail (track and platforms); Auckland Transport (buildings)
- Operator: Auckland One Rail
- Line: Western Line
- Platforms: Side platforms (P1 & P2)
- Tracks: Mainline (2)

Construction
- Platform levels: 1
- Parking: Yes
- Cycle facilities: Yes
- Accessible: Yes

Other information
- Station code: SVE
- Fare zone: Waitākere

History
- Opened: 28 February 1924
- Electrified: 20 July 2015

Passengers
- 2009: 941 passengers/day

Services
Preceding station	Auckland Transport (Auckland One Rail)	Following station
Henderson towards Swanson	East West Line	Glen Eden towards Manukau
Henderson Terminus	Onehunga West Line	Glen Eden towards Onehunga
Location

Sunnyvale railway station is located on the East West line and Onehunga West line of the Auckland railway network.

The station has two side platforms, connected by a pedestrian underpass. A pedestrian bridge across Oratia Stream provides access from Heremai Street.

== History ==
The station was opened on 28 February 1924.

In 2006–2007, the station was closed over summer to be upgraded, and lengthened for 6-car trains. A second platform was added, opening on 4 December 2006.

On 8 June 2010, the double tracking of the Western Line was completed.

The station was electrified in 2015.

== Services ==
East West and Onehunga West line suburban train services are provided by Auckland One Rail on behalf of Auckland Transport.

== In popular culture ==
Sunnyvale railway station was seen during the fourth episode of Outrageous Fortune's fifth season.

== See also ==
- List of Auckland railway stations
