= Morningside railway station, Auckland =

Train station in New Zealand

Morningside
- Morningside Station platforms in 2026.

General information
- Location: Morningside, Auckland; New Zealand
- Coordinates: 36.874986°S 174.735253°E
- System: Auckland Transport Urban rail
- Owner: KiwiRail (track and platforms); Auckland Transport (buildings)
- Operator: Auckland One Rail
- Line: North Auckland Line
- Distance: 12.91 km (8.02 mi) from Westfield Junction
- Platforms: Island platform (P1 & P2)
- Tracks: Mainline (2); Passing loop (2)

Construction
- Parking: No
- Cycle facilities: No
- Accessible: Yes

Other information
- Fare zone: Isthmus

History
- Opened: 29 March 1880
- Electrified: 20 July 2015

Passengers
- 2009: 489 passengers/day

Services
Preceding station	Auckland Transport (Auckland One Rail)	Following station
Baldwin Avenue towards Swanson	East West Line	Kingsland towards Manukau
Baldwin Avenue towards Henderson	Onehunga West Line	Kingsland towards Onehunga
Location

Morningside railway station is a station on the East West line and Onehunga West line of the Auckland Railway Network. It has an island platform and is accessed via a level crossing on Morningside Drive and by a subway from New North Road.

== History ==
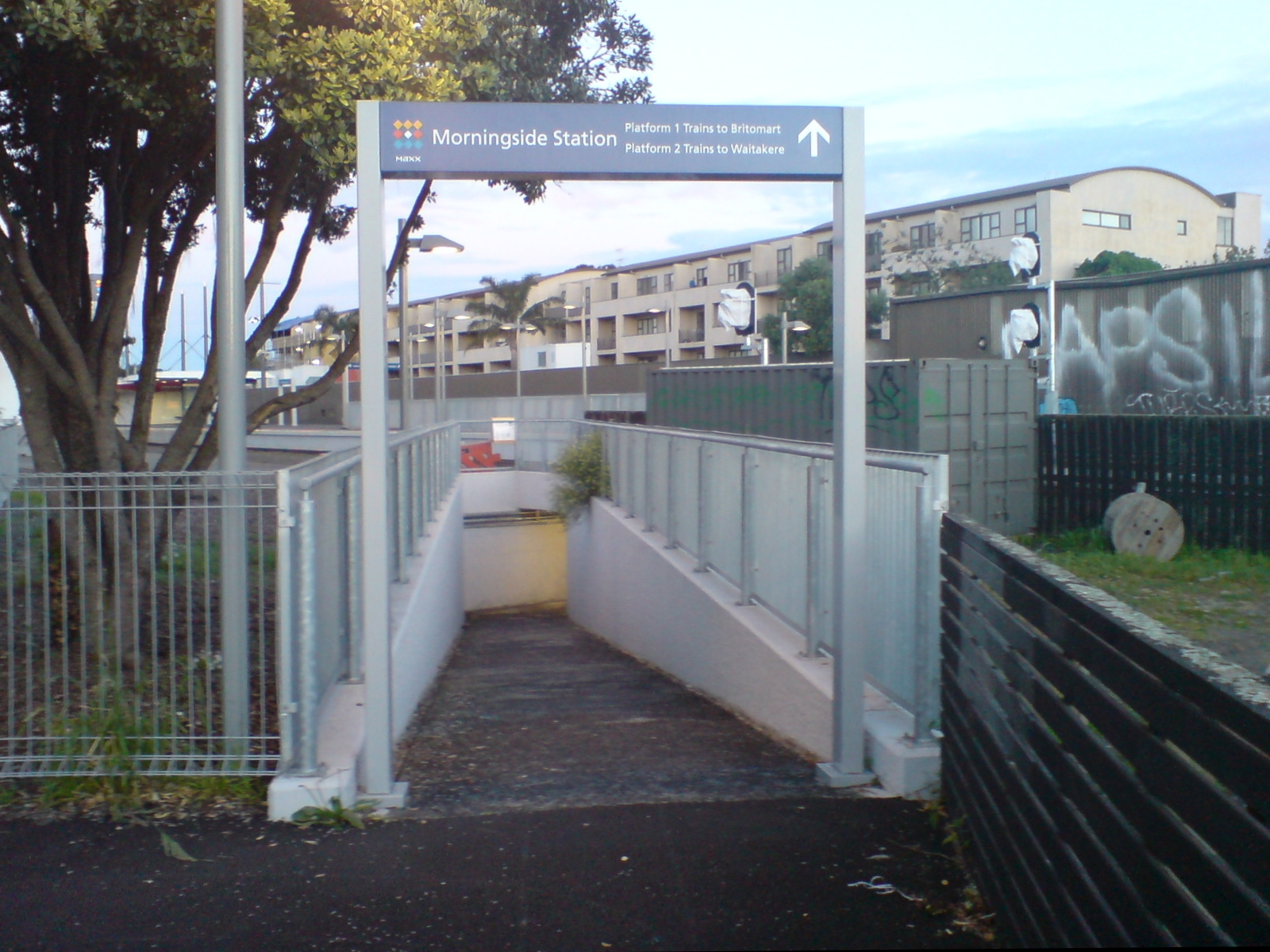
The underpass that links New North Road and Morningside Station in 2010.

- 1880: It opened as one of the original stations on the North Auckland Line.
- 1914: A signal box was established here.
- 1966: The line between Morningside and Avondale was partially double-tracked and the platform was upgraded to an island platform layout.
- 1993: The platform was modified slightly to meet the requirements of new ex-Perth trains.
- 2009: An upgraded station was opened.
- 2013: In February, a woman in a wheelchair which was stuck in the tracks was rescued from the path of an approaching train.
- 2014: Electrification infrastructure installed as part of the electrification of Auckland's railway network.

== Services ==
East West and Onehunga West line suburban train services are provided by Auckland One Rail on behalf of Auckland Transport.

Bus routes 20, 22N, 22R, 209, 221, and 223 pass close to Morningside station.

== In media ==
Morningside Station was featured in the music video for Lorde's song "Royals".

== Accidents ==
On 29 January 2015, a pedestrian was struck by a train and killed at Morningside station whilst attempting to cross at a pedestrian level crossing.

== See also ==
- List of Auckland railway stations
- Public transport in Auckland
