= East West line (Auckland) =

Railway service in Auckland, New Zealand

- E-W
- East West line platforms at Maungawhau

Overview
- Service type: Commuter rail
- System: Public transport in Auckland
- Locale: Auckland, New Zealand
- Predecessor: Eastern Line; Western Line
- First service: 13 September 2026
- Current operator: Auckland One Rail

Route
- Termini: Swanson; Manukau
- Stops: 27
- Distance travelled: 50 km (31 mi)
- Lines used: North Auckland Line; North Island Main Trunk; Manukau Branch

Technical
- Rolling stock: AM class
- Track gauge: 1,067 mm (3 ft 6 in)
- Electrification: Overhead line, 25 kV 50 Hz AC
- Track owners: KiwiRail (tracks and platforms); Auckland Transport (trains and buildings)
Route map
Key

The East West line (E-W) is a 50 km (31 mi) train service operating in Auckland, New Zealand, since 13 September 2026. It is a merger of the former Eastern Line and the Western Line. The line runs between Swanson and Manukau via the City Rail Link (CRL). It connects to other rapid transit lines: AirportLink Bus, NX1, NX2, South City Line (S-C), Onehunga West Line (O-W), WX1, and 70 Bus.

== Routing ==
From Swanson in west Auckland, East West line services operate eastward via the North Auckland Line to Maungawhau. At Maungawhau trains continue onto the North Island Main Trunk, passing beneath the Auckland CBD through the underground stations Karanga-a-Hape, Te Waihorotiu and Waitematā. After re-surfacing on the eastern side of the CBD, trains continue along the North Island Main Trunk to Puhinui, before turning onto the short Manukau Branch to terminate at Manukau.

=== Stations ===
Name	Opened	Notes
Manukau^{H}	15 April 2012	A bus interchange (Manukau bus station) adjacent to the station was opened in April 2018.
Puhinui^{H}	29 June 1925	New station and bus–train interchange opened on 26 July 2021.
Papatoetoe	20 May 1875	–
Middlemore	20 July 1947	–
Ōtāhuhu^{H}	20 May 1875	New station and bus–train interchange opened October 2016.
Sylvia Park	1 September 1929	Original station closed on 6 March 1983. A new station opened on 2 July 2007 adjacent to the Sylvia Park mall.
Panmure^{H}	16 November 1930	An upgraded station was opened in the first half of 2007.
Glen Innes	6 May 1930	–
Meadowbank	21 July 1947	Replaced the original Purewa station but was also known as Purewa until 22 February 1954.
Ōrākei	16 November 1930	–
Waitematā^{H}	7 July 2003	–
Te Waihorotiu^{H}	13 September 2026	–
Karanga-a-Hape^{H}	13 September 2026	–
Maungawhau^{H}	29 March 1880	Closed until 2026 for redevelopment of the City Rail Link construction.
Kingsland	29 March 1880	–
Morningside	April 1882	–
Baldwin Avenue	28 September 1953	–
Mount Albert	29 March 1880	Platform rebuilt and upgraded and pedestrian walkways opened in 2-stage programme 2012–2016.
Avondale	29 March 1880	Original station replaced with a temporary facility on 19 January 2009 pending completion of new station. Reopened on 8 June 2010.
New Lynn^{H}	29 March 1880	Original station closed on 28 June 1986. New station opened in 1984 and replaced with temporary facility on 4 May 2009 pending completion of trench. Current station opened on 24 Sep 2010.
Fruitvale Road	28 September 1953	–
Glen Eden	29 March 1880	–
Sunnyvale	28 February 1924	–
Henderson^{H}	21 December 1880	Rebuilt on 24 October 2006. Reopened on 2 November 2006.
Sturges Road	1934	–
Rānui	16 November 1925	–
Swanson	18 July 1881	Terminus for electric unit services. Platform replaced in 2000.
^{H} Major transport hub station.		

== Gallery ==
E-W line Departure Board at Maungawhau Station

== See also ==
- Public transport in Auckland
- List of Auckland railway stations
