= Sturges Road railway station =

Train station in Auckland, New Zealand

Coordinates: 36°52.4′S 174°37.2′E

Sturges Road
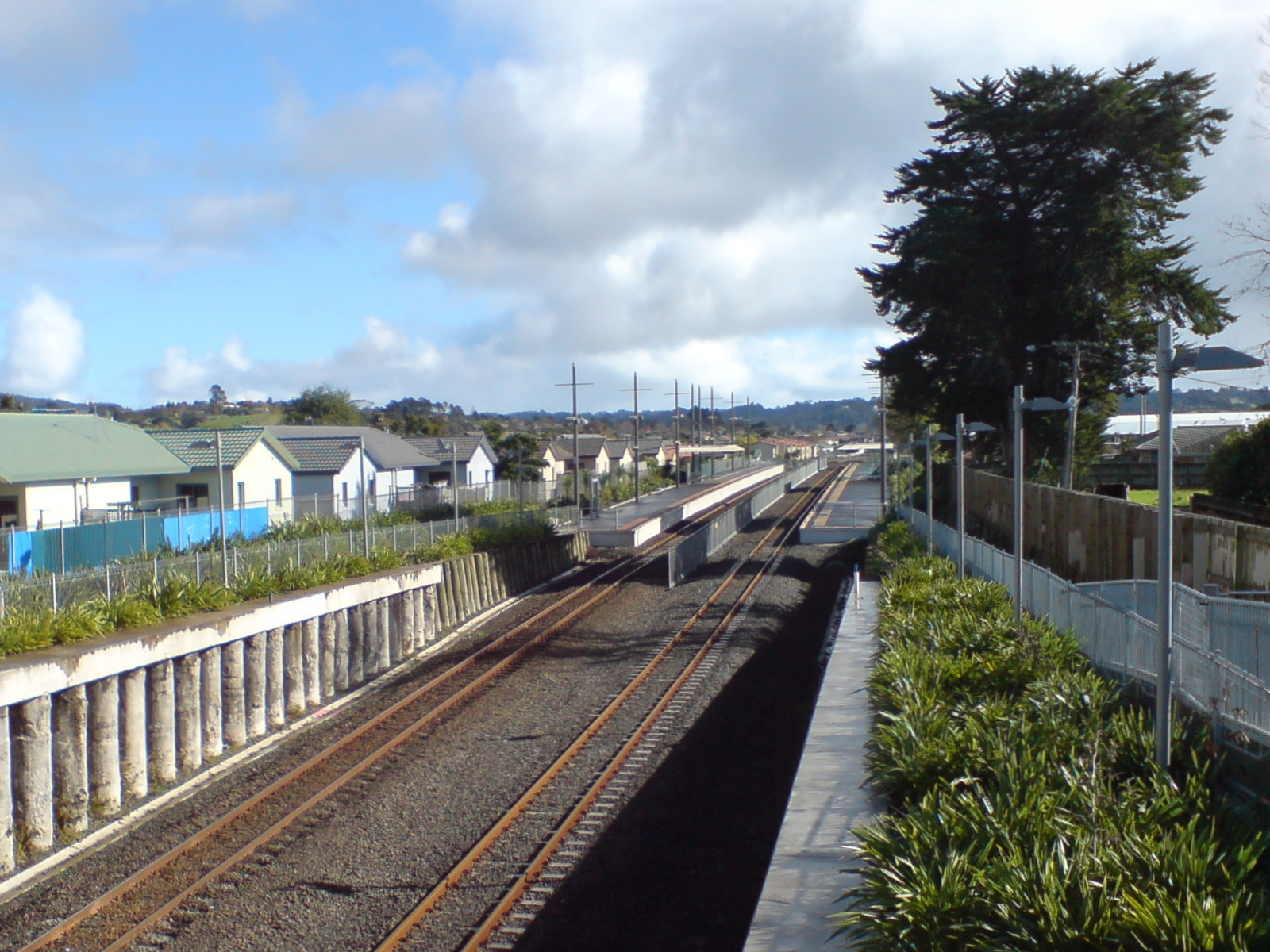
- Looking west at the station from Sturges Road.

General information
- Location: Henderson, West Auckland
- System: Auckland Transport Urban rail
- Owner: KiwiRail (track and platforms); Auckland Transport (buildings)
- Operator: Auckland One Rail
- Line: Western Line
- Platforms: Side platforms (P1 & P2)
- Tracks: Mainline (2)

Construction
- Platform levels: 1
- Parking: Yes
- Cycle facilities: Yes
- Accessible: Yes

Other information
- Station code: SRD
- Fare zone: Waitākere

History
- Opened: 30 April 1934
- Rebuilt: 2008
- Electrified: 20 July 2015

Passengers
- 2009: 1,144 passengers/day

Services
Preceding station	Auckland Transport (Auckland One Rail)	Following station
Rānui towards Swanson	East West Line	Henderson towards Manukau
Location

Sturges Road railway station in Henderson is on the East West line of the Auckland railway network. It has a park and ride facility available.

== History ==
The station was opened on 30 April 1934, with other improvements to the Northern Line services.

For many years this station's name was mis-spelt as Sturgess Road. The road was named after a local family living in the area in the 19th century called Sturges, but the incorrect spelling remained in use for many decades until it was corrected in the 1990s.

== Services ==
East West line suburban train services, between Swanson and Manukau, are provided by Auckland One Rail on behalf of Auckland Transport.

== See also ==
- List of Auckland railway stations
