= Rānui railway station =

Train station in Auckland, New Zealand

Coordinates: 36°52.1′S 174°36.2′E

Rānui
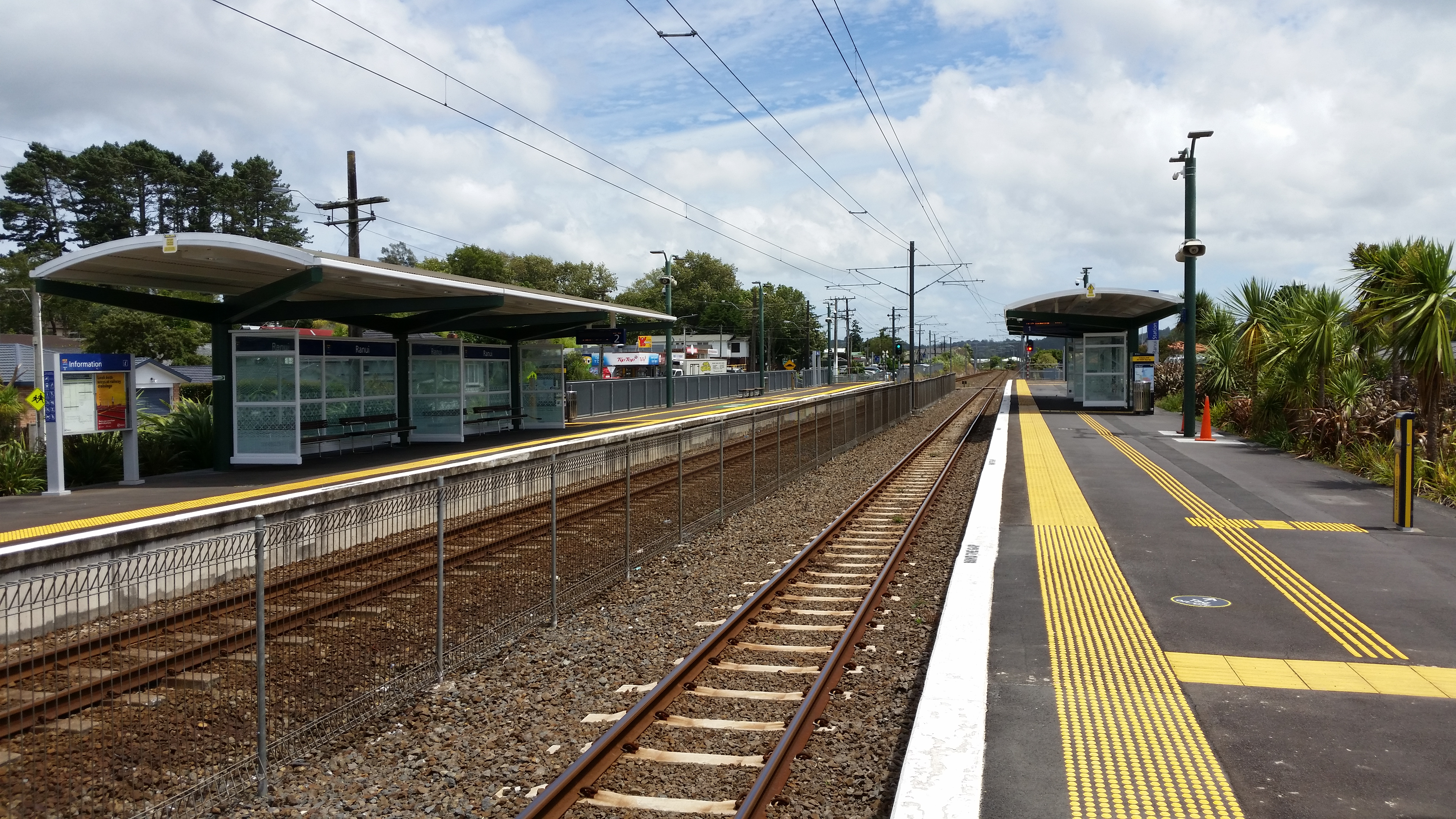
- The station in January 2018, looking northbound from the southbound platform

General information
- Location: Ranui Station Road, Rānui, Auckland,
- System: Auckland Transport Urban rail
- Owner: KiwiRail (track and platforms); Auckland Transport (buildings)
- Operator: Auckland One Rail
- Line: Western Line
- Platforms: Side platforms (P1 & P2)
- Tracks: Mainline (2)

Construction
- Platform levels: 1
- Parking: Yes
- Cycle facilities: Yes
- Accessible: Yes

Other information
- Station code: RAN
- Fare zone: Waitākere

History
- Opened: 16 November 1925
- Rebuilt: January 2008
- Electrified: 20 July 2015

Passengers
- 2009: 989 passengers/day

Services
Preceding station	Auckland Transport (Auckland One Rail)	Following station
Swanson Terminus	East West Line	Sturges Road towards Manukau
Location

Rānui railway station is located on the East West line of the Auckland rail network in New Zealand. It serves the communities of Rānui and Pooks Road, in the West Auckland suburb of Rānui.

== History ==
The station was opened on 16 November 1925. The stop was re-built as a "signature station" as part of rail upgrades in 2004.

As part of upgrades to Auckland's urban rail network, ARTA had proposed building a stabling yard to store up to 11 trains to the west of the station. The yard was to be used to clean trains when out of service, and there were to be staff car parking and welfare facilities. Due to opposition from locals this was abandoned and the stabling yard was moved to Henderson.

In 2017 local residents complained about the number of assaults at the station and the threatening characters "hanging around" the station, which led to security staff being stationed there for a period.

== Services ==
East West line suburban train services, between Swanson and Manukau, are provided by Auckland One Rail on behalf of Auckland Transport.

== See also ==
- List of Auckland railway stations
