= Onehunga West line =

Railway service in Auckland, New Zealand

- O-W
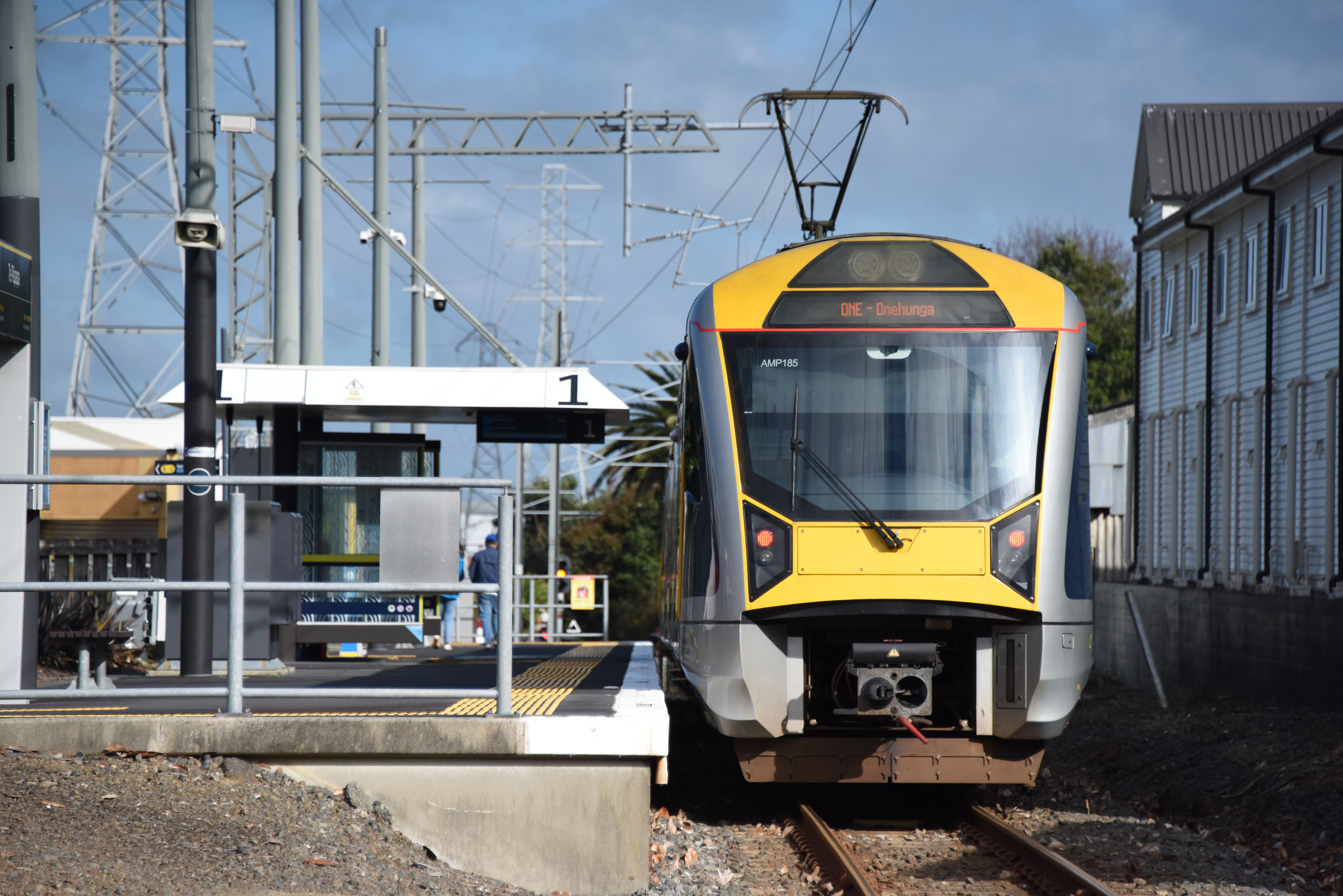
- Train at Te Papapa

Overview
- Service type: Commuter rail
- System: Public transport in Auckland
- Locale: Auckland, New Zealand
- Current operator: Auckland One Rail

Route
- Termini: Onehunga; Maungawhau (peak); Henderson (off-peak)
- Stops: 19
- Service frequency: 30 minutes
- Lines used: Onehunga Branch; North Auckland Line

Technical
- Rolling stock: AM class
- Track gauge: 1,067 mm (3 ft 6 in)
- Electrification: Overhead line, 25 kV 50 Hz AC
- Track owners: KiwiRail (tracks and platforms); Auckland Transport (trains and buildings)

The Onehunga West line (O-W) is a train service operating in Auckland, New Zealand. The line runs between Onehunga and Henderson via Grafton. It connects to other rapid transit lines: South City line (S-C) and East West line (E-W). Prior to the opening of the City Rail Link on 13 September 2026, services ran from Newmarket to Onehunga as the Onehunga Line.

== Routing ==
From Onehunga in the south of the Auckland isthmus, Onehunga West line services operate via the short Onehunga Branch along its length to Penrose. From Penrose, services continue north-west via the North Auckland Line to Newmarket, where the line turns westward and skirts the Auckland CBD through Grafton. Peak services terminate one station further at Maungawhau, while off-peak services continue along the North Auckland Line to terminate at Henderson in west Auckland.

== History ==
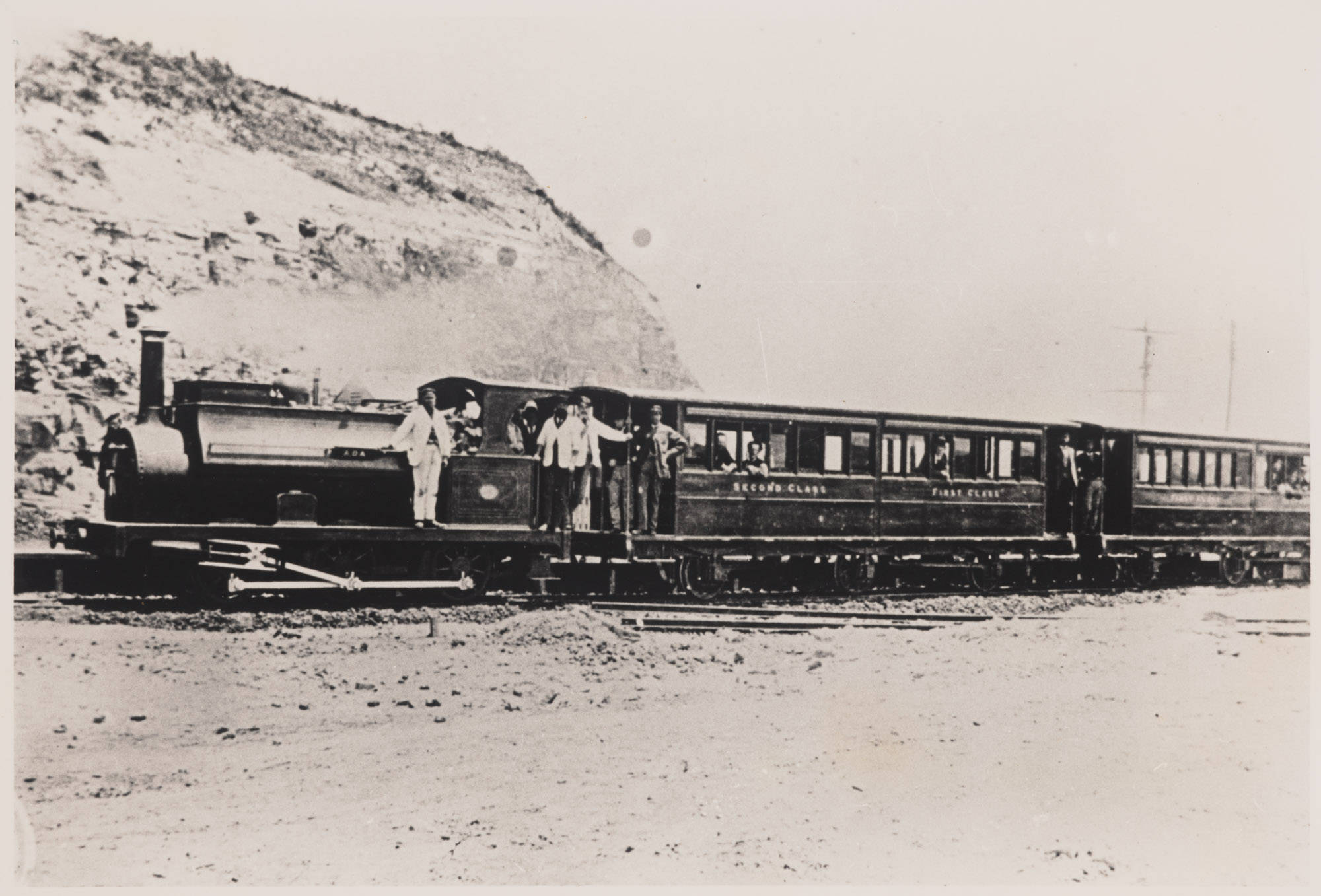
The first passenger train on the Auckland and Onehunga Railway, 24 December 1873

The line did not acquire its name until 2010, when the Onehunga Branch line was reopened and passenger services resumed from the Auckland terminus after a lapse of almost 40 years.

The Penrose to Onehunga section of this line was opened on 24 December 1873, and extended to Onehunga Wharf on 28 November 1878. Connecting the port of Onehunga on the Manukau Harbour with Penrose and from there to the port of Auckland on the Waitematā Harbour, the line became a busy link between the two harbours of the rapidly expanding city.

Passenger services between Auckland and Onehunga ran until April 1973. The Onehunga Branch line between Penrose and Onehunga then served local industries until it was mothballed. A campaign to reopen the branch line was launched in mid-2002. On 13 March 2007, the Government announced that it had given approval to spend $10 million on reopening the branch line for passengers and freight.

In mid-2010, construction started on the terminus station at Onehunga, and on Saturday 18 September 2010, reopening ceremonies were held, with Sunday 19 September being the first day of normal passenger services. The cost of reopening the branch line was about $21.6 million, with KiwiRail contributing $10 million, Auckland Regional Transport Authority contributing $3.6 million, and Auckland Regional Council contributing $8 million.

The Onehunga Line was upgraded as part of the Auckland railway electrification programme. It was the first of the four Auckland suburban lines to be commissioned. Installation of overhead wires was completed during the summer shut down from 2011 to 2012. Electric services began running between Britomart and Onehunga on 28 April 2014.

On 24 June 2022, the line was shortened to terminate at Newmarket due to a reduction of platforms at Britomart for City Rail Link construction. Auckland Transport said data showed only 15% of passengers on the line travelled to Britomart and that they could easily transfer to other services at Newmarket, thus the change would be the least disruptive of those needed to allow the reduction in platforms. Former Auckland councillor Mike Lee - who had an instrumental role in the 2010 reopening of the line - criticised the change. During Stage 2 of the Rail Network Rebuild between March 2023 and January 2024, the line was restored to Britomart during off-peak and weekends, running as a shuttle between Penrose and Onehunga during peak hours. As of 29 April 2024, Onehunga Line train services were again shortened to terminate at Newmarket at all times of the day.

In August 2025, AT announced that after the opening of the City Rail Link, the Onehunga Line would be renamed the Onehunga West line and it would extend to Henderson during the off-peak, with services terminating at Maungawhau during peak hours.

== Stations ==
Stations on the Onehunga West line
Name	Opened	Notes
Henderson	21 December 1880	
Sunnyvale	28 February 1924	
Glen Eden	29 March 1880	
Fruitvale Road	28 September 1953	
New Lynn	29 March 1880	
Avondale	29 March 1880	
Mount Albert	29 March 1880	
Baldwin Avenue	28 September 1953	
Morningside	29 March 1880	
Kingsland	29 March 1880	
Maungawhau	29 March 1880	
Grafton	9 April 2010	
Newmarket	20 December 1873	
Remuera	20 December 1873	
Greenlane	20 December 1873	
Ellerslie	20 December 1873	
Penrose	24 December 1873	
Te Papapa	8 April 1877	Closed on 19 February 1973 and reopened on 18 September 2010. Services recommenced on 19 September 2010.
Onehunga	20 December 1873	Closed on 19 February 1973 and reopened on 18 September 2010. Services recommenced on 19 September 2010.

== Proposed airport connection ==
In 2007, there was a proposal to create the Auckland Airport Line by extending the Onehunga Branch line to Auckland International Airport over the Mangere Bridge. The bridge was duplicated from four motorway lanes to ten in 2007–10, and Transit New Zealand had announced in 2007 that it was being 'future proofed' to allow it to accommodate a rail line.

== See also ==
- Public transport in Auckland
- List of Auckland railway stations
