= Onehunga railway station =

Train station in Auckland, New Zealand

Onehunga
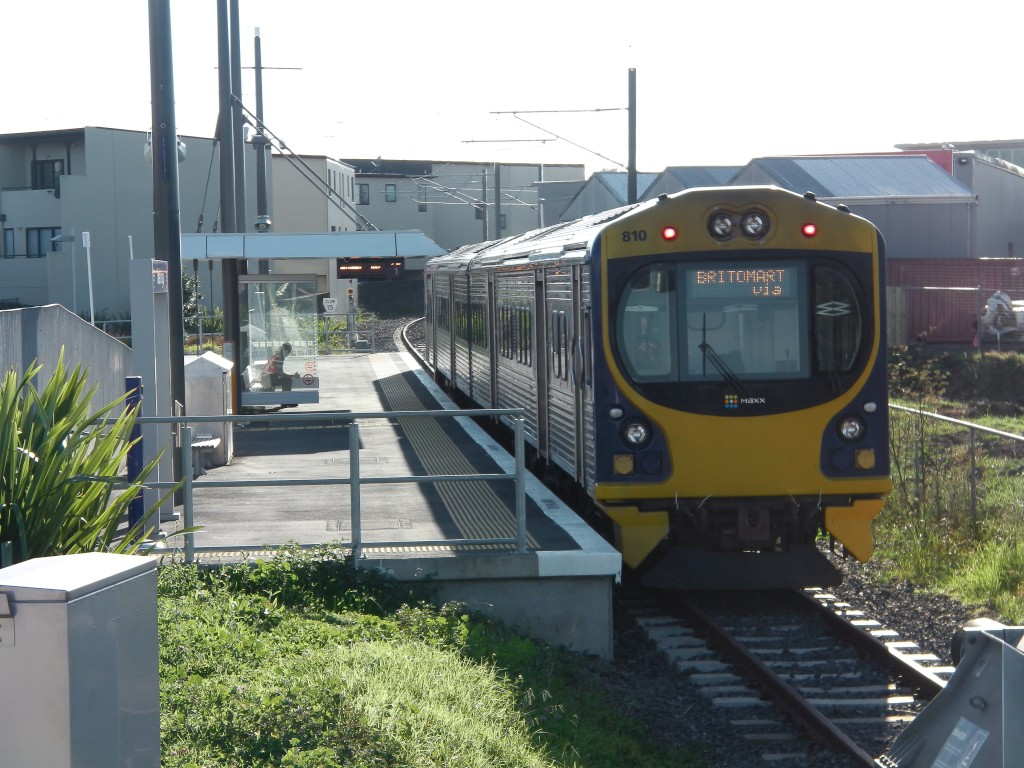
- Onehunga Station

General information
- Location: Onehunga, Auckland; New Zealand
- Coordinates: 36.9259°S 174.7863°E
- System: Auckland Transport Urban rail
- Owner: KiwiRail (track and platforms); Auckland Transport (buildings)
- Operator: Auckland One Rail
- Line: Onehunga Branch
- Platforms: Side platform (P1)
- Tracks: 1

Construction
- Parking: Yes
- Cycle facilities: Yes; racks under cover
- Accessible: Yes

Other information
- Station code: OHA
- Fare zone: Isthmus

History
- Opened: 18 September 2010
- Electrified: April 2014

Key dates
- 1873: Town station opened
- 1878: Wharf station opened
- 1927: Wharf station closed
- 1973: Town station closed

Passengers
- CY 2018: 447,434

Services
Preceding station	Auckland Transport (Auckland One Rail)	Following station
Te Papapa towards Henderson	Onehunga West Line	Terminus
Location
- 1: Town station 1873–1973, 2: Wharf station 1878–1927, 3: Current station 2010–

Onehunga railway station is the terminus station on the Onehunga Branch of the Auckland railway network in New Zealand. It is located at the southern end of Onehunga Town Centre and consists of a single side platform.

Onehunga West line services to Henderson are provided by Auckland One Rail on behalf of Auckland Transport.

== History ==
=== Background ===
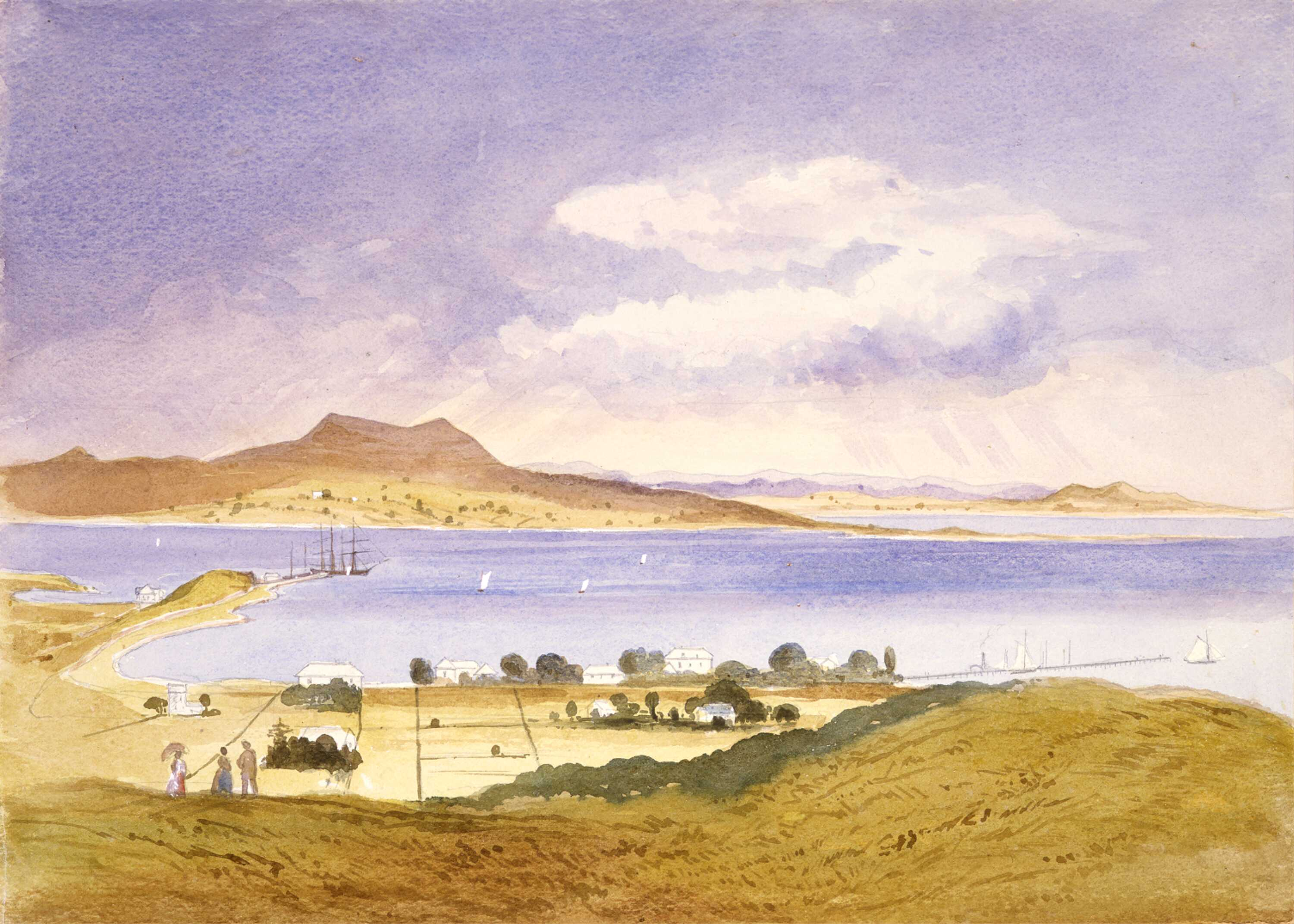
Watercolour sketch of Onehunga by William Fox, circa 1863

New Zealand’s first Fencible settlement was established in Onehunga in 1847. For the first settlers the waterways were the primary means of access to the outside world. The beach was used to land small vessels, and by 1860 a jetty had been built as an all-tide port. Many successful industries developed around the port, and it became one of the region's largest, rivaling Auckland.

The first public transport in the region was provided by horse-drawn buses. Regular services between Auckland and Onehunga began in the 1860s, but the journey was arduous and time-consuming. The roads were poor, and passengers often had to help push the cart up steep inclines and through swampy areas.

Following a survey in 1862, the Auckland and Drury Railway Act 1863 was passed on 14 December 1863 "to enable the Superintendent of the Province of Auckland to construct a Railway between the Towns of Auckland and Drury with a Branch to Onehunga in the said Province."

=== Town station ===
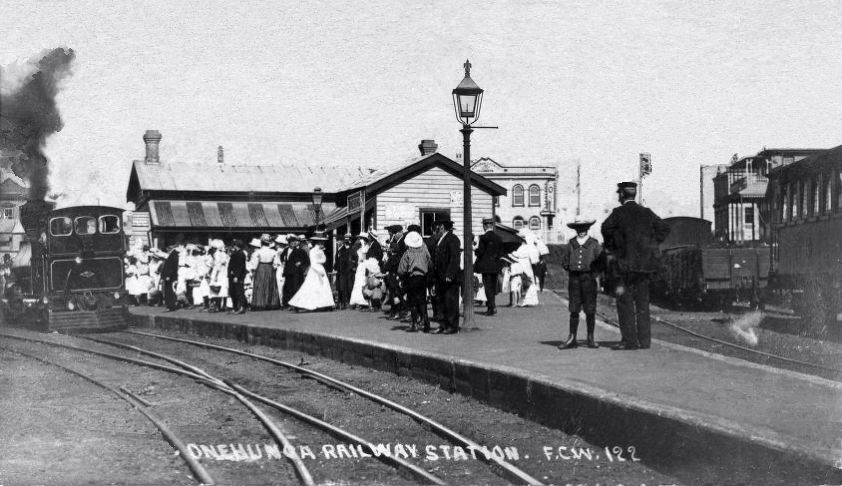
Onehunga station, early 1900s.

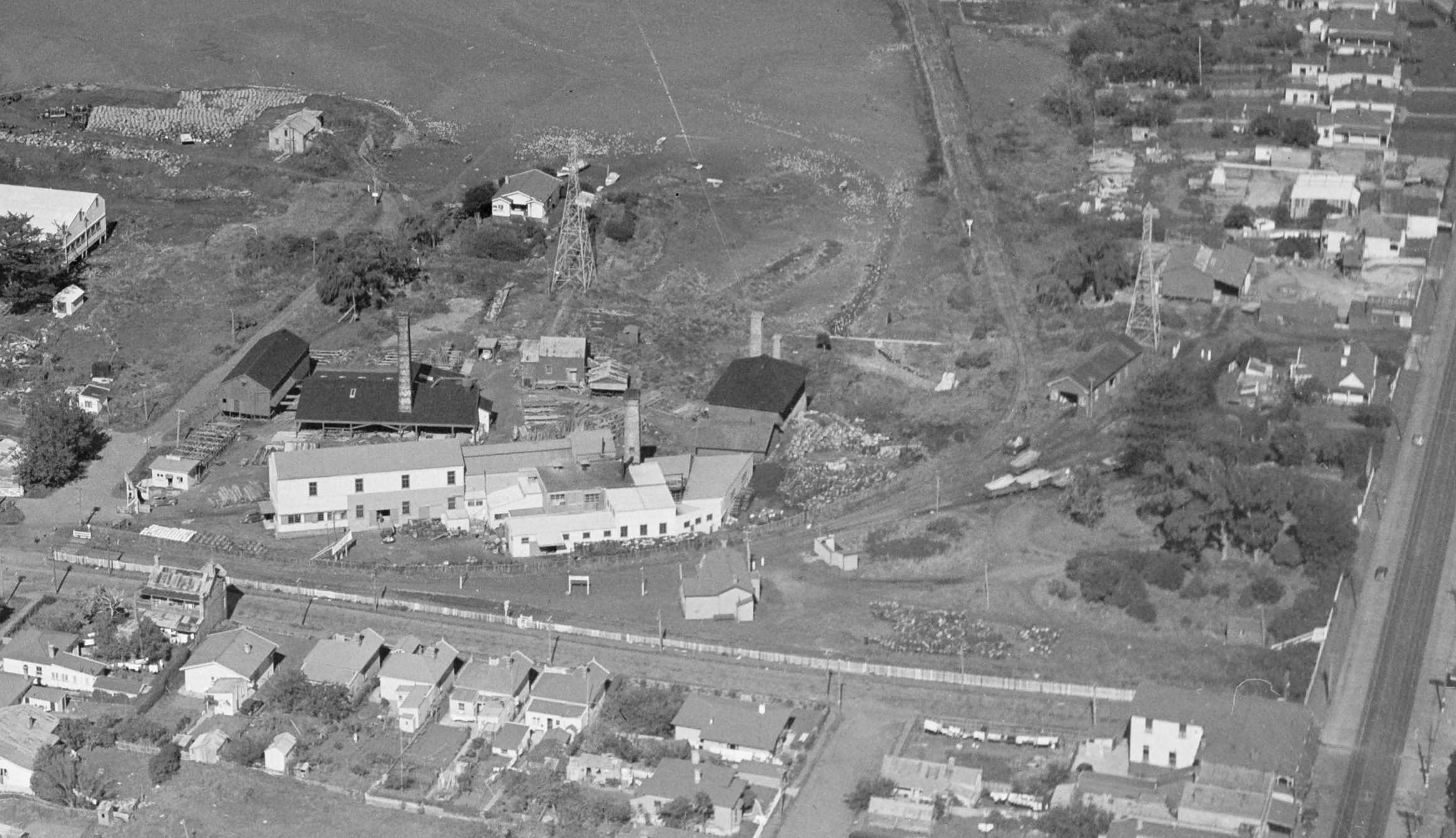
Onehunga station, 1946.

The first Onehunga station opened in December 1873, as the southern terminus of the Auckland and Onehunga Railway. It was one of the first stations to be built under the Julius Vogel Railway Act 1870. The first timetabled train from Auckland to Onehunga ran on 24 December 1873, the 'F' class locomotive named 'Ada' with one first class and three second class carriages.

The station building was constructed with shiplap weatherboards and corrugated-iron roof sheathing, and had a concave-roofed verandah supported by plain posts. Additions were made in 1881, including a new ladies' waiting room. This was likely when the building was given its unusual 'L' shaped layout.

The nearby Courthouse Hotel, built in 1865, later known as the Post Office Hotel, became the Railway or Terminus Hotel. The opening of the rail line was a momentous occasion, marked with a special train "crowded with eminent citizens from Auckland", and a lunch at the hotel.

A Post and Telegraph office was established in a wooden building which had been shipped from Russell and re-erected near the station site in 1850. This was later replaced by a new brick post office building which was officially opened on 14 February 1902 by Sir Joseph Ward, Minister of Railways and Post and Telegraph.

=== Centralisation ===
The railway was operated by Brogden & Co until 30 April 1874, when it was handed over to the provincial government. When the provincial governments were abolished in 1876 it came under central control of the Public Works Department, then the New Zealand Railways Department in 1880. On 24 December 1881 daily services to Onehunga commenced.

=== Wharf station ===
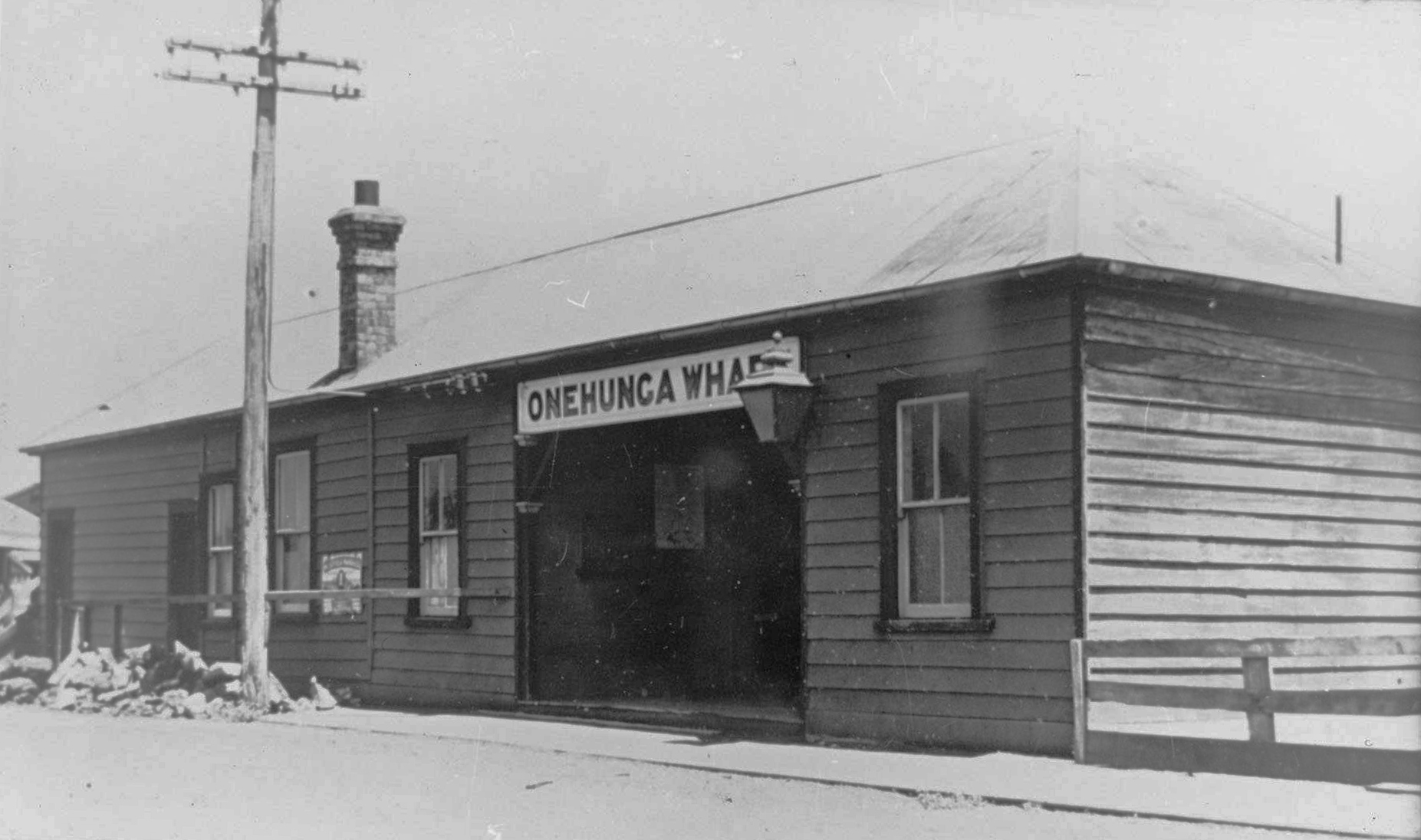
Onehunga Wharf railway station building, c. 1920.

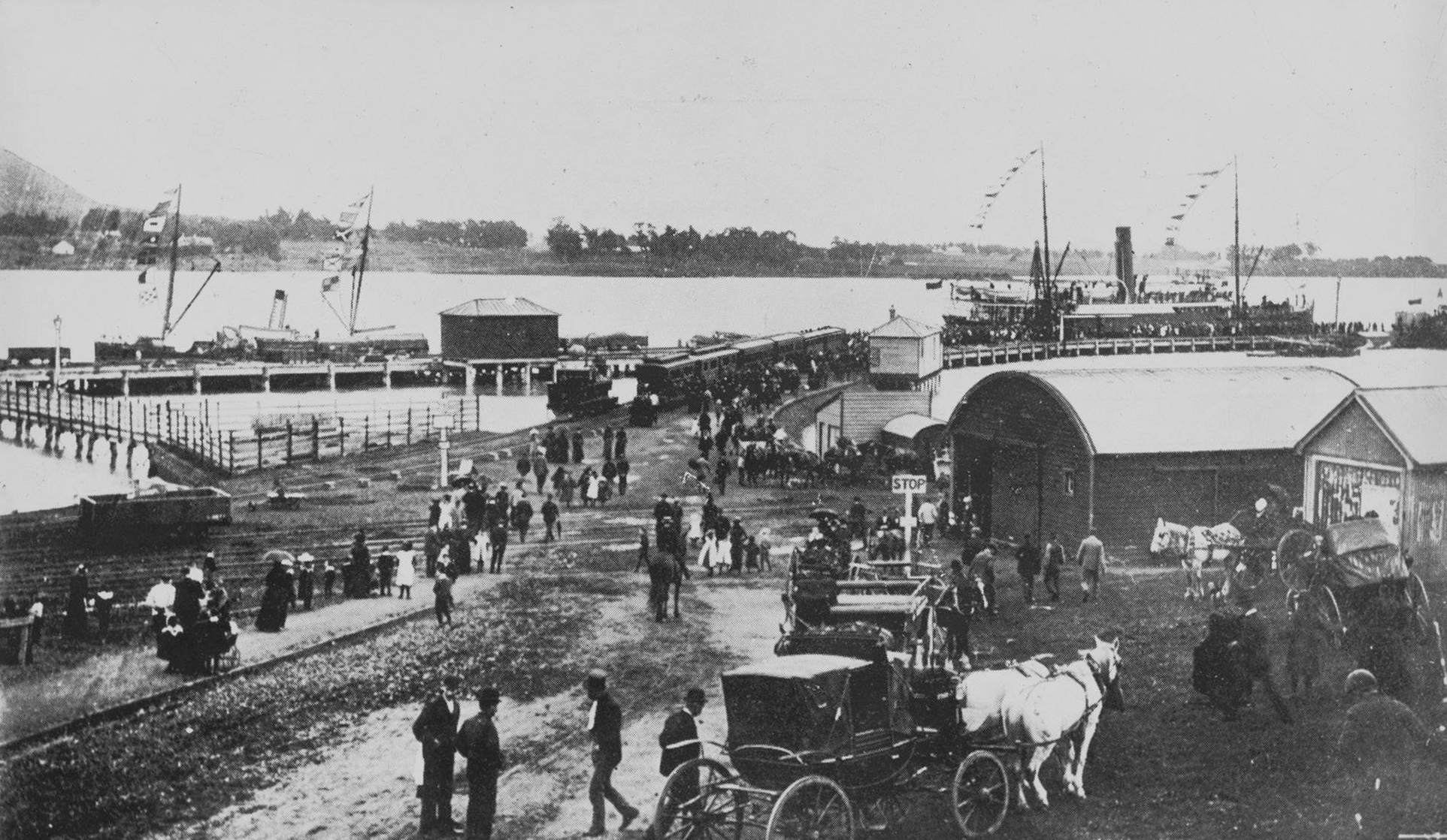
Crowds alighting from a railway locomotive and moving towards a steamer, 1890s.

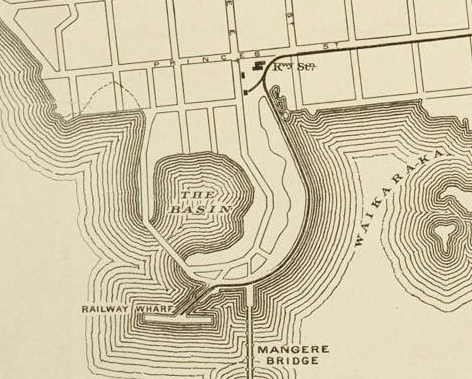
Excerpt from an 1892 cadastral map shewing the 'Railway Wharf'.

In 1878 the line was extended to the wharf and the Onehunga Wharf railway station opened, connecting railway services with steam ship services. The port became the main link between Auckland and the southern settlements.

The Waiuku and Onehunga Steam Navigation Company operated the steamship Manukau from 1880 to 1894, with journeys to Waiuku taking less than three hours. It was later replaced by the Weka. The Union Steam Ship Company dominated west coast shipping, and from 1883 provided regular passenger and mail services to the port, including runs between Onehunga and Lyttleton. The Northern Steamship Company ran vessels between Onehunga and New Plymouth.

After the opening of the New Plymouth Express in December 1886, it became possible to travel from Auckland to Wellington by 'boat train'. Passengers would travel from Auckland to the 'railway wharf' by train, then to New Plymouth by steamer, and finally to Wellington by train.

=== Competition ===
In 1903 the Auckland Electric Tram Company completed its link between Epsom and Onehunga. The tram route from the Epsom tram barn extended past the town station, with service to the wharf commencing in September 1903. The line boasted that it was the only "Coast-to-Coast tramway in the world." It became possible to travel from Auckland to Onehunga by tram, then to New Plymouth by overnight steamer.

Long-distance transport services began to shift from water-based to land-based. The railway was extended southward over the years, eventually reaching Wellington when the North Island Main Trunk railway was opened in 1908. In 1908 the Union Steam Ship Company withdrew from the West Coast. Onehunga Borough Council was never able to secure enough funds to improve wharf and harbour facilities, and the Auckland Harbour Board took control of the port in 1911.

By the 1920s more extensive bus services were running. The Royal Bus Company ran services between Auckland and Onehunga; Reeves and Son ran services to Weymouth via Onehunga; and The Universal Motor Coach Service covered Onehunga, Royal Oak, Māngere, and Papatoetoe. From 1949 trams were gradually replaced by trolley busses. The Epsom-Onehunga route down Manukau Road was the last Auckland tram line to close, with its final run on 29 December 1956. A ceremonial last service was attended by over 1000 people, including the Mayor of Auckland.

=== Closure ===
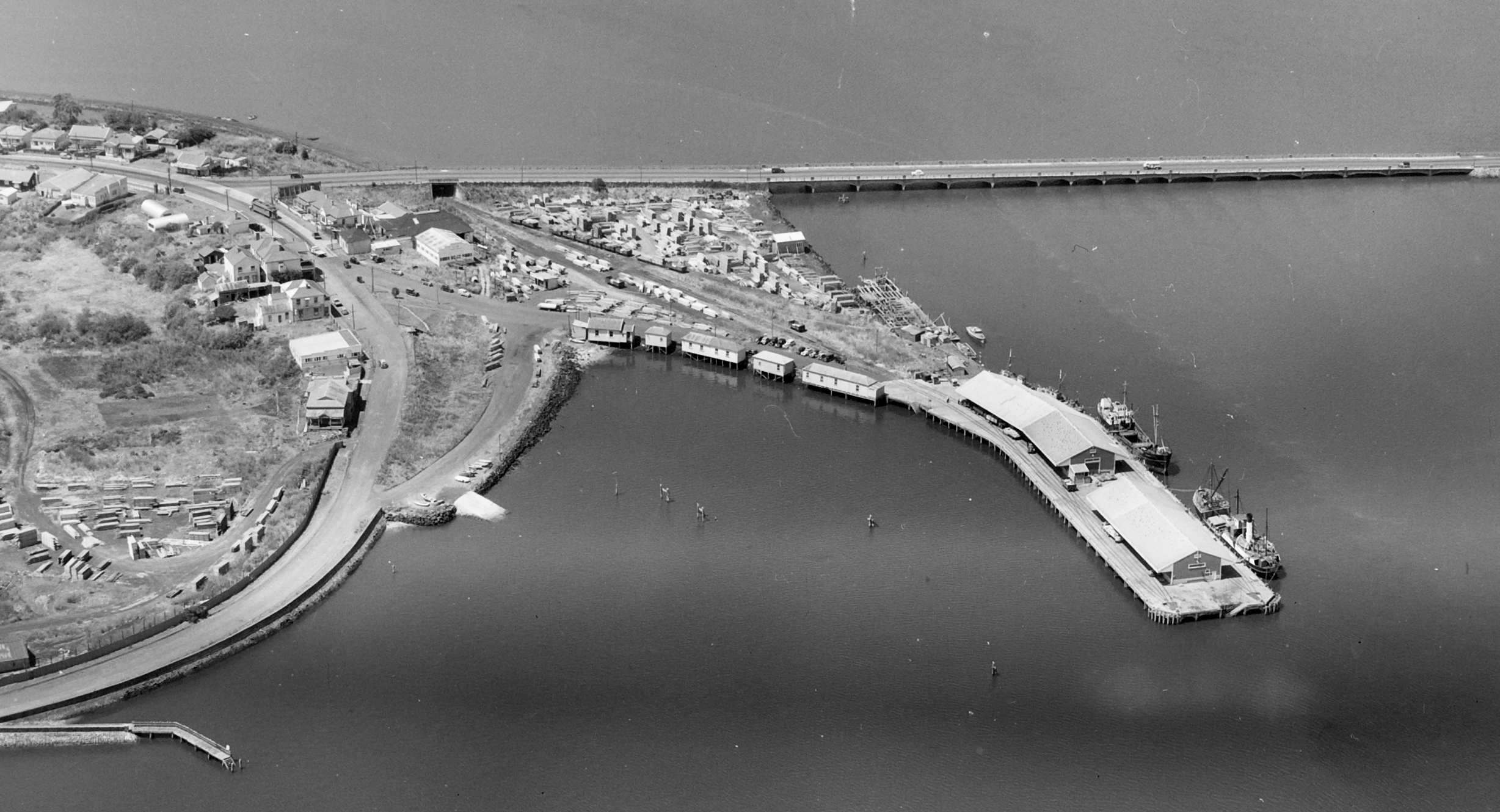
Onehunga Wharf, 1954.

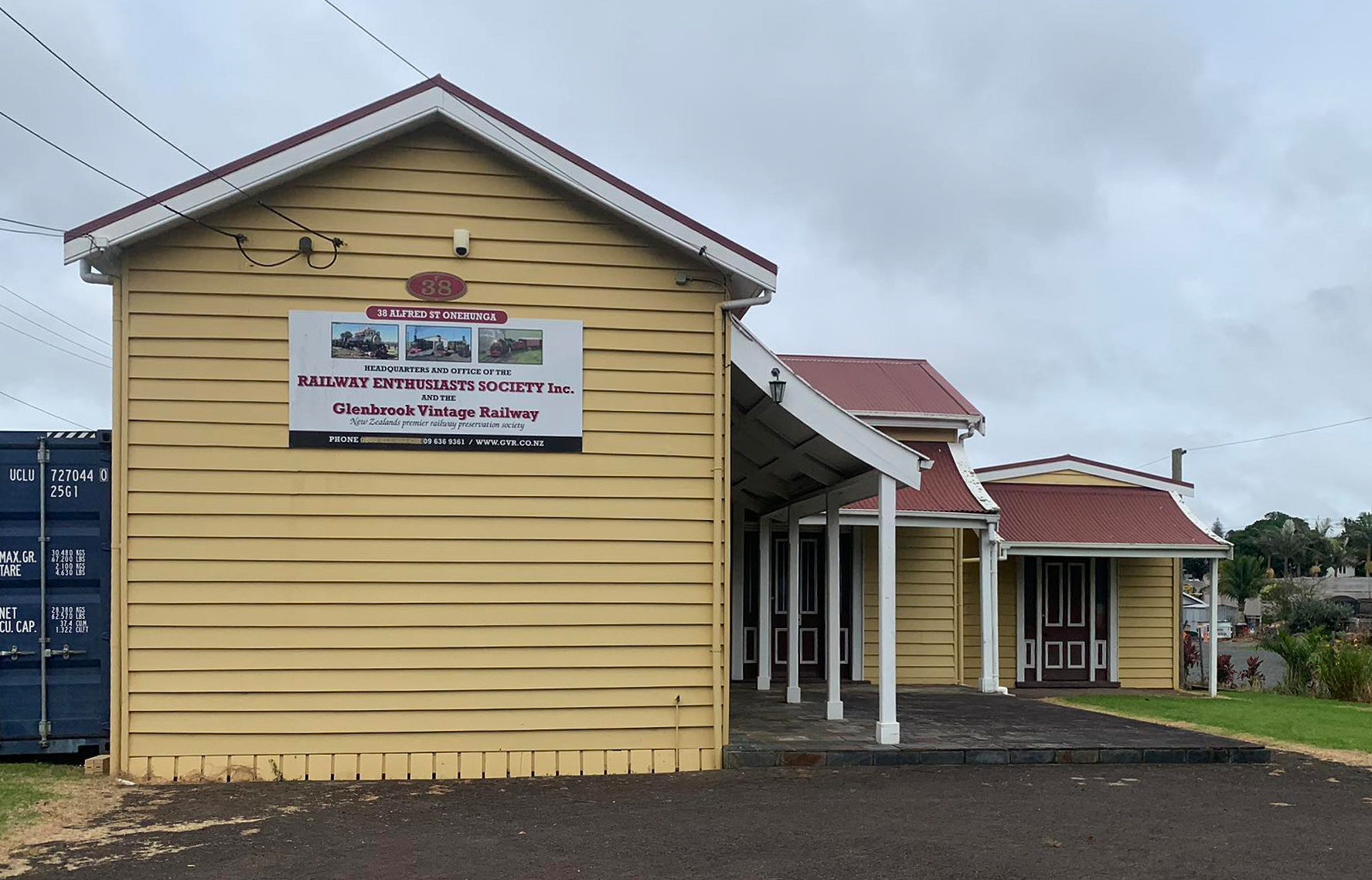
The relocated station building, 2024.

The new overland services, difficulty of navigation in the shallow Manukau Harbour, and disruptions from World War I contributed to a decline in passenger transport and shipping at the port. Passenger services by boat ended and the amount of goods carried dropped significantly. In November 1927 the wharf station was closed, but the line remained open for goods traffic, with freight trains running to the port until 1989.

Direct passenger train services between Onehunga and Auckland ceased on 28 July 1950, but a workers' train service continued running between Onehunga and Penrose, until 19 January 1973 when line was completely closed to passenger services.

The original station building was sold in 1962, then subsequently relocated to nearby 38 Alfred Street, where it has become the headquarters of the Railway Enthusiasts Society. It is the oldest surviving railway station building in New Zealand.

=== Re-opening ===
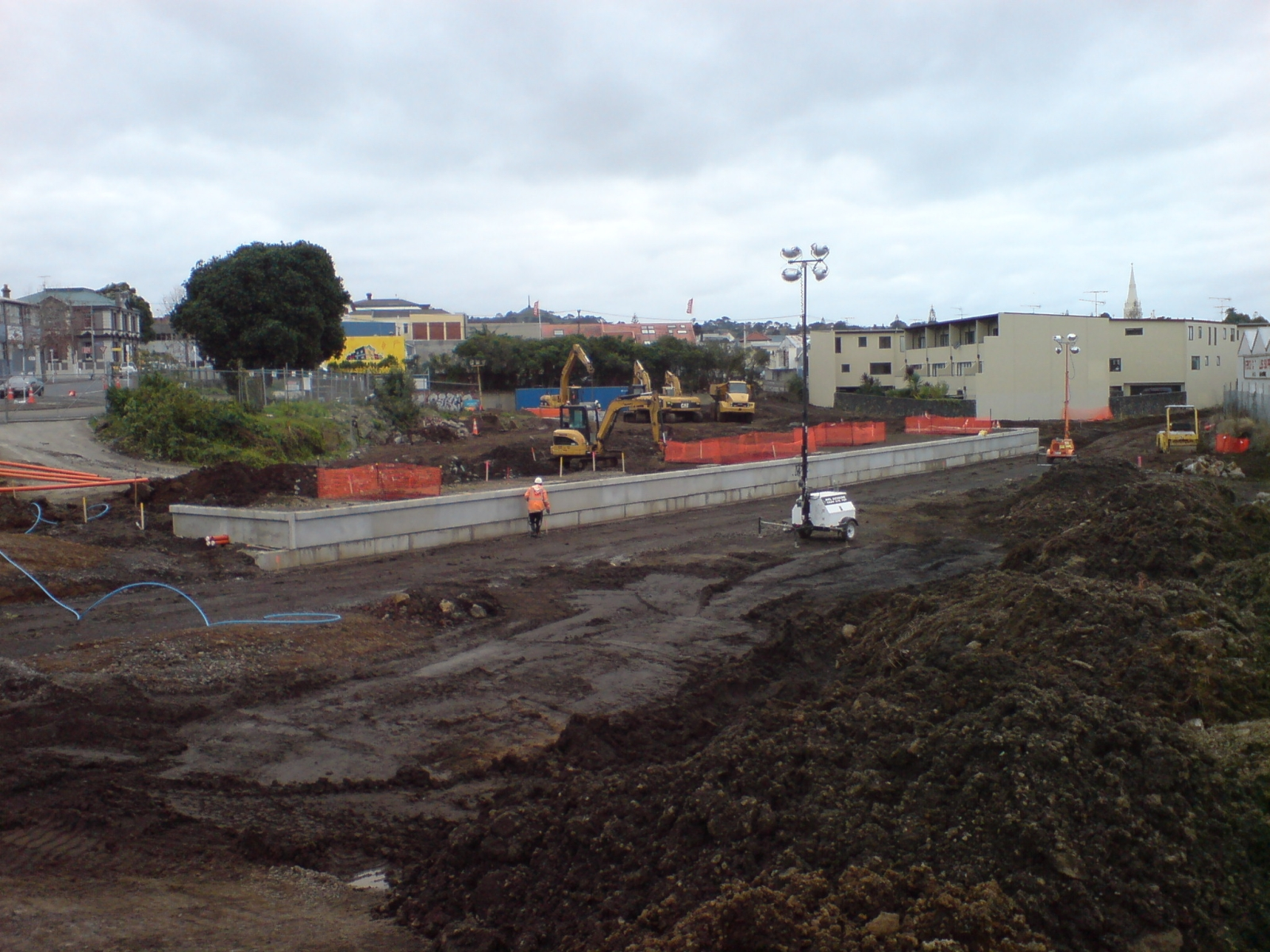
Constructing the new platform, 2010.

The campaign to reopen the line was launched by Auckland Regional Council councillor Mike Lee in mid-2002. In 2007, following a successful 8000-signature petition, the government announced that the 3.5km branch line between Penrose and Onehunga would be reinstated. Construction started on the new station in 2010.

Regular services started on 19 September 2010, after an official opening ceremony the previous day. The first official train at the station was a two car ADC class diesel multiple unit, followed by a NZR J^{A} class steam locomotive provided by Mainline Steam.

The station was first served by electric trains on 28 April 2014, with the Onehunga Line being the first passenger services to use AM Class Electric Multiple Units.

In c. 2018 the Onehunga Wharf was acquired by Auckland Council.

== See also ==
- Onehunga Branch
- Public transport in Auckland
- Transport in Auckland
- List of Auckland railway stations
