= Henderson railway station =

Train station in Auckland, New Zealand

Henderson
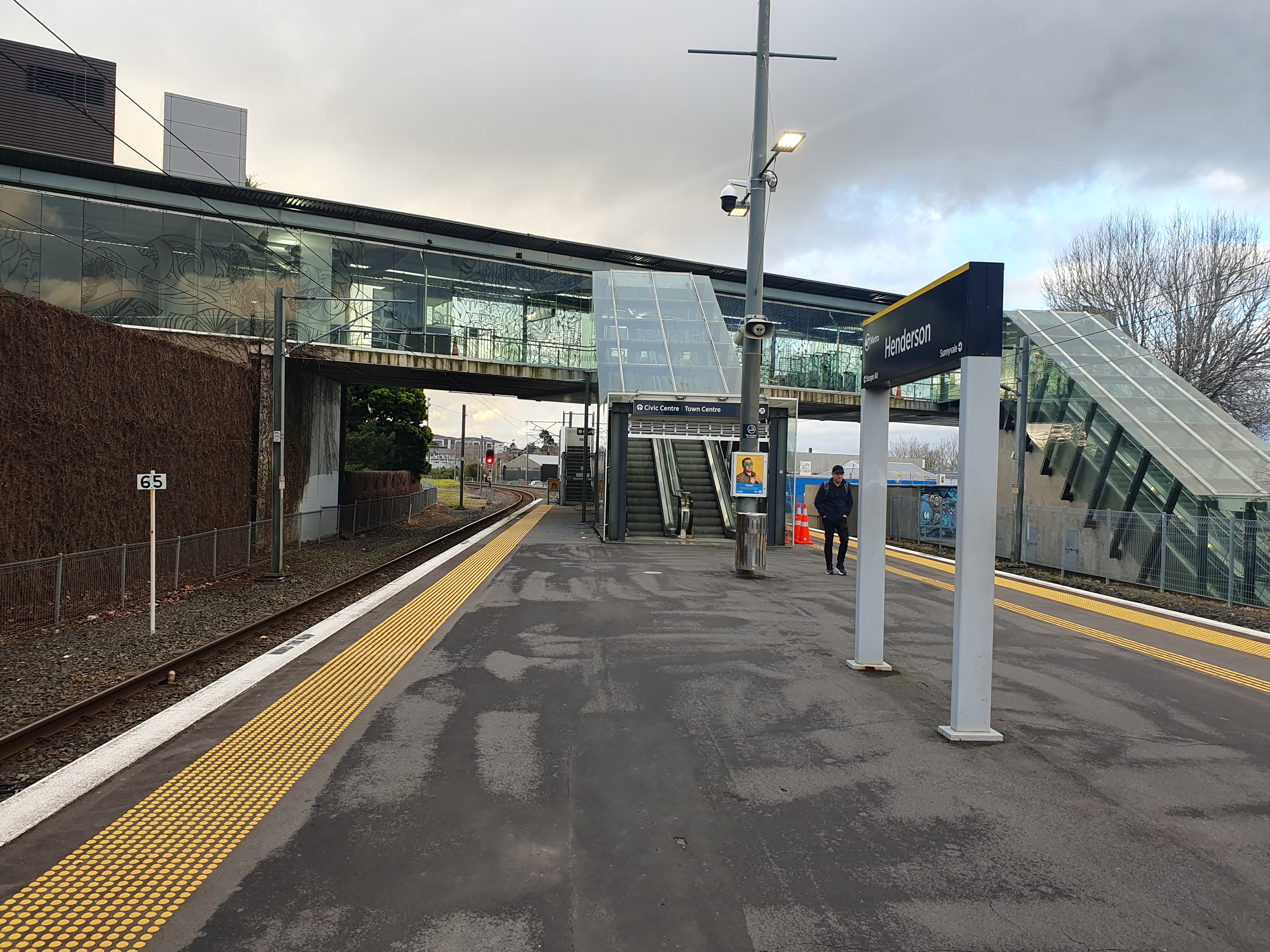
- The station in 2023

General information
- Location: Railside Avenue, Henderson, West Auckland
- Coordinates: 36.88094°S 174.63091°E
- System: Auckland Transport Urban rail
- Owner: KiwiRail (track and platforms); Auckland Transport (buildings)
- Operator: Auckland One Rail
- Line: Western Line
- Platforms: Island platform (P1 & P3); Bay platform (P2)
- Tracks: Mainline (2); Bay platform (1)

Construction
- Platform levels: 1
- Parking: No
- Cycle facilities: No
- Accessible: Yes (Lifts)

Other information
- Station code: HND
- Fare zone: Waitākere

History
- Opened: 2 October 1880
- Rebuilt: 2006, 2026
- Electrified: 20 July 2015

Passengers
- 2009: 2,372 passengers/day

Services
Preceding station	Auckland Transport (Auckland One Rail)	Following station
Sturges Road towards Swanson	East West Line	Sunnyvale towards Manukau
Terminus	Onehunga West Line	Sunnyvale towards Onehunga
Location

Henderson railway station is a major station on the East West line and Onehunga West line of the Auckland railway network in New Zealand. It is located near the town centre of Henderson, the western administration offices of Auckland Council, and a major shopping centre, WestCity Waitakere.

== History ==
Henderson was not originally considered as a location for the railway line between Helensville and Auckland to pass through but Thomas Henderson the representative for the area and namesake of the town successfully had the route changed to pass through Henderson. This allowed for Henderson to grow into one of the largest towns in Waitemata County.

The station was opened on 2 October 1880 for goods and on 21 December 1880 for all services including passengers.

Growth had made the old station buildings become unsuitable for purpose and in 1912 a new building was constructed. The railway station was designed based on Scottish architect George Troupe's railway station design 4A class B. Troupe had designed different types of station buildings based on numerous factors. The original porter's and guard's sheds were added to the northern side of the station building. The building also served as the post office for Henderson.

Passenger rail in New Zealand would start to decline from the 1920s following the introduction of affordable automobiles and in September of 1987 the station was decommissioned.

== Old railway station building ==
Henderson Railway Station
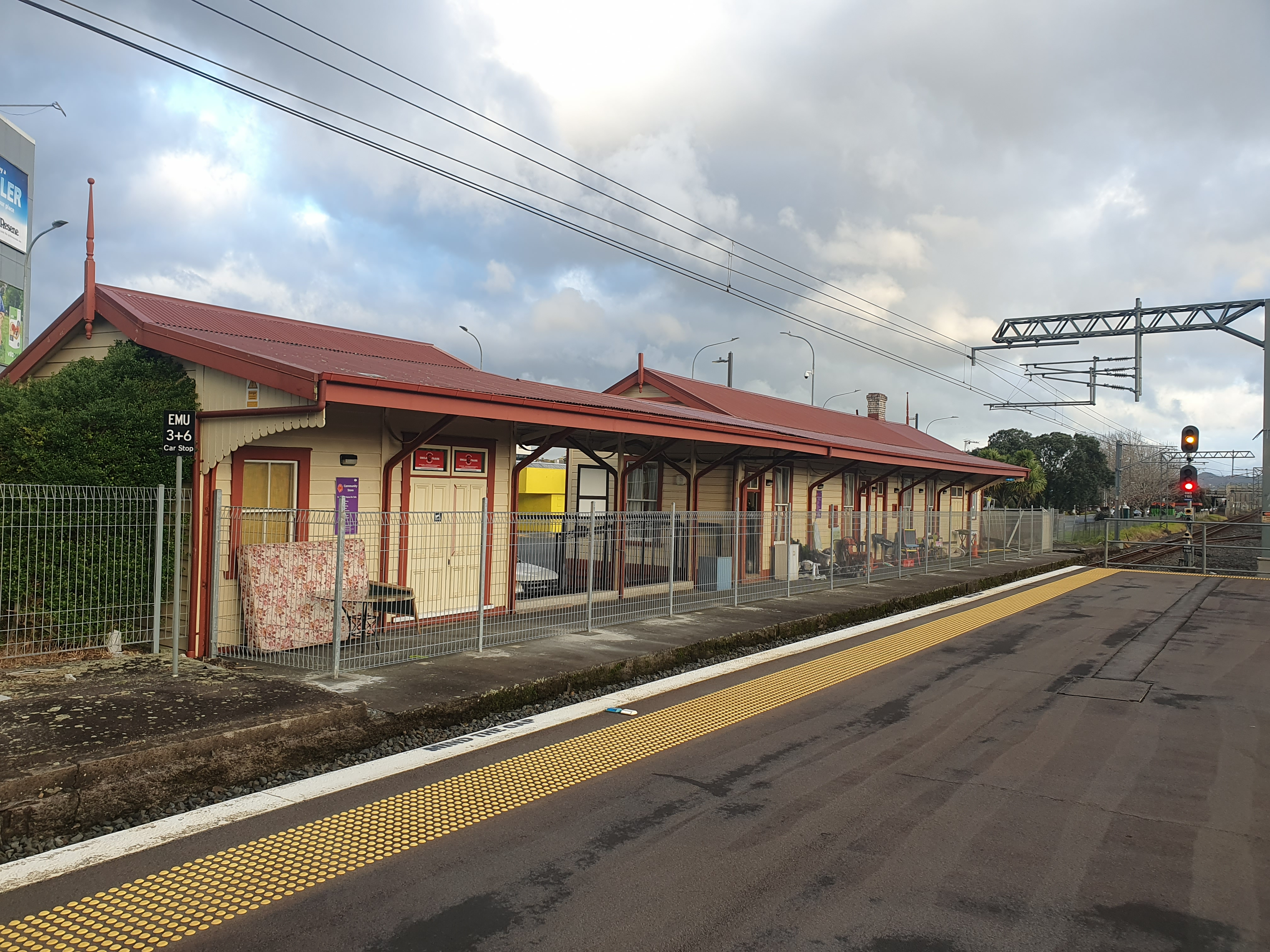
- The Henderson Railway Station buildings On the left is the original porter's and guard's shed.

General information
- Architectural style: Edwardian
- Location: 35 Railside Avenue, Henderson, Auckland
- Year built: 1912

Design and construction
- Architect: George Troupe

Heritage New Zealand – Category 2
- Designated: 6 June 2004
- Reference no.: 7538

Following the decommission of the railway line the old station building served as retail for several years but the building itself would start to decay. In 2000 it was purchased by the Henderson Heritage Trust. In 2009 it would begin restoration work which was finished in 2013 at a cost of nearly $500,000. The Trust now lease the building out to various community organisations.

The building is registered as category 2 Historic Place with Heritage New Zealand and as category B with Auckland Council.

The former Henderson Railway Station is made up of two different buildings connected via canopy. The detailing of both buildings is Edwardian. Both buildings feature a gabled roof with a wing at the southern end having a hipped roof. The cladding is made from timber weatherboards and joined by timber. The 1912 building has eaves, two chimneys, and finials on the ends of the gables. The windows of the 1912 building are timber and have double hung sashes and a mullion in the centre. The doors of both buildings are four panelled with a transom and centred mullion. The 1912 building has a verandah with stanchions made from old railway track, this was not unique to the Henderson Railway Station and was used in other designs by Troupe.

== Upgrades ==
A major upgrade of the station was completed on 24 October 2006. The new station opened on 2 November 2006, 125 years after the railway first reached Henderson. It has an island platform. Stairs and escalators, enclosed in transparent panels, connect to an overhead walkway that connects to the council's office buildings and to the adjacent Railside Avenue.

In 21 August 2010 a "Distributed Stabling Facility" was opened because locals objected to the proposal to open the facility at Ranui railway station. ARTA had proposed it as part of the upgrading of the network, to store up to 11 trains and to clean trains when out of service; with staff car parking and welfare facilities.

In October 2024, work began to construct a bay platform and additional tracks at the station. Construction was completed in June 2026, with the platforms being renumbered. The former Platform 2 became Platform 3 and the new bay platform became Platform 2. Along with the construction of the new platform, a new emergency bridge was constructed at the southern end of the station. All lifts and escalators were upgraded as part of this project.

=== Station name ===
It was proposed that the station be renamed Waitakere Central when it was upgraded because it was integrated with the then-Waitakere City Council's new Civic Building. There were objections that there would be confusion with Waitakere railway station, also on the Western Line. Due to opposition to the name change, the station had Waitakere Central only as a subtitle. In practice, the station is never referred to by the name but the council uses it to refer to its premises, directly above the platforms. However, by 2023 Waitakere Central had been removed from signage at the Station.

== Services ==
Auckland One Rail, on behalf of Auckland Transport, operates East West line and Onehunga West line train services between Swanson, Manukau and Onehunga.

Bus routes 12, 13, 14, 15, 133, 133X, 135, 141, 143, 145, 147, 151, 152, 162, 022 (Schools) and 050 (Schools) arrive and depart from the transport interchange on Railside Avenue.

== See also ==
- List of Auckland railway stations
- Public transport in Auckland
