= Auckland One Rail =

Train operator in New Zealand

Coordinates: 36.84648079°S 174.76568605°E

Overview
- Parent company: ComfortDelGro (50%); UGL Rail (50%)
- Headquarters: Auckland, New Zealand
- Dates of operation: 16 January 2022–

Other
- Website: www.aucklandonerail.co.nz

Auckland One Rail (AOR) is a train operator that commenced operating services under contract to Auckland Transport in January 2022. They are the operator of the trains in the Auckland suburban rail network. The Conglomerate is a 50/50 joint venture owned by Singapore-based ComfortDelGro and Australian-based UGL Rail. The operation is the first overseas heavy rail venture by a Singapore company, as well as ComfortDelGro's first in New Zealand. Officers of the business are Martin Kearney (CEO) and Gavin Panter (COO).

== History ==
On 27 August 2021, Auckland One Rail was awarded an eight-year contract by Auckland Transport to operate the Auckland suburban rail network, beating a consortium of Transdev, John Holland and CAF. It took over from Transdev Auckland on 16 January 2022. The contract is worth around NZD$130 milion per year over an initial eight year term, and the venture will take over responsibility for train maintenance from 2025.
