= Baldwin Avenue railway station =

Train station in Auckland, New Zealand

Baldwin Avenue
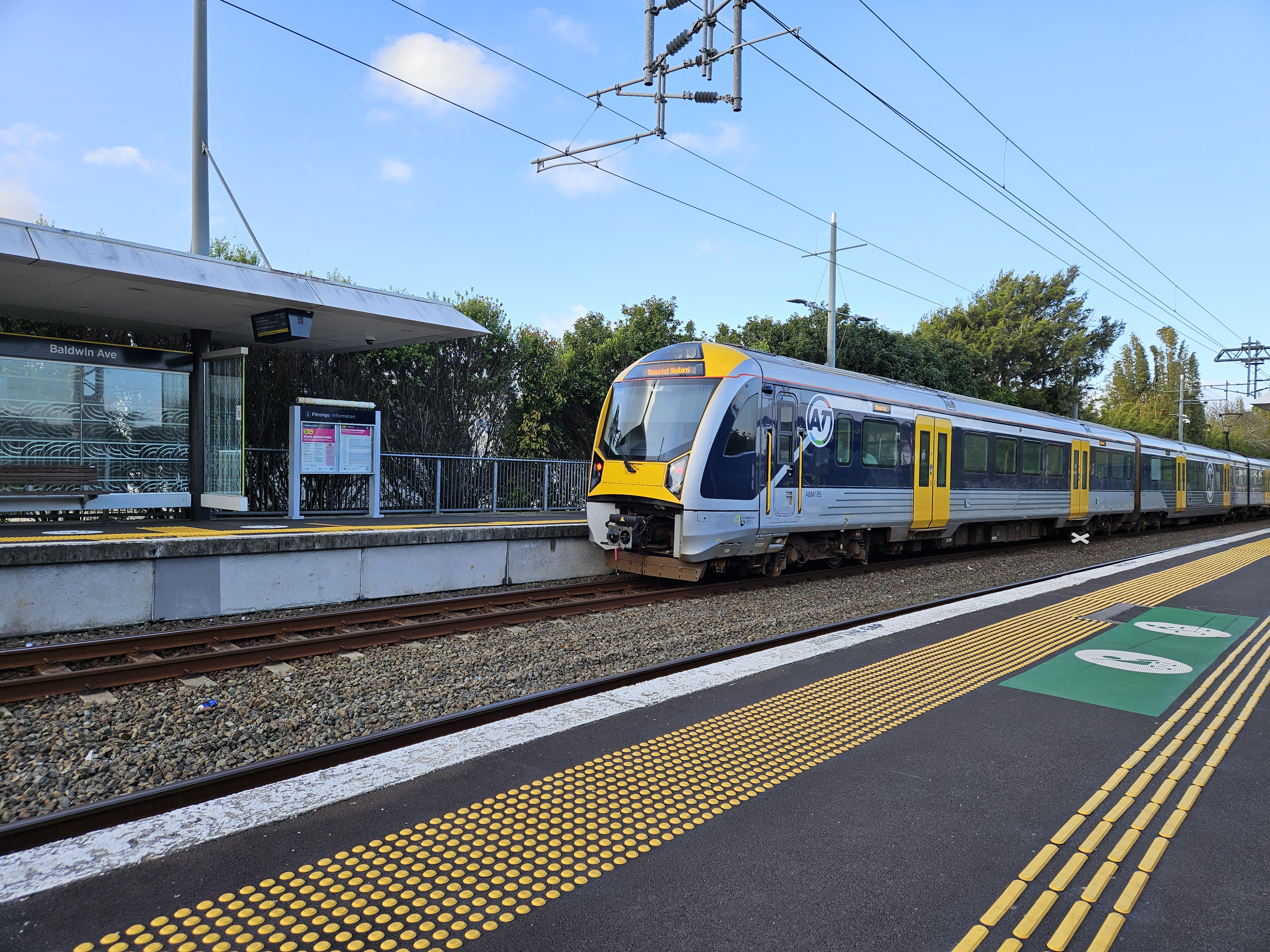
- Baldwin Avenue railway station in 2024

General information
- Location: Mount Albert, Auckland; New Zealand
- Coordinates: 36°52.672′S 174°43.2′E
- System: Auckland Transport Urban rail
- Owner: KiwiRail (track and platforms); Auckland Transport (buildings)
- Operator: Auckland One Rail
- Line: North Auckland Line
- Distance: 14.39 km (8.94 mi) from Westfield Junction
- Platforms: Side platforms (P1 & P2)
- Tracks: Mainline (2)

Construction
- Parking: No
- Cycle facilities: Yes
- Accessible: Yes

Other information
- Fare zone: Isthmus

History
- Opened: 28 September 1953
- Electrified: 20 July 2015

Passengers
- 2009: 739 passengers/day

Services
Preceding station	Auckland Transport (Auckland One Rail)	Following station
Mount Albert towards Swanson	East West Line	Morningside towards Manukau
Mount Albert towards Henderson	Onehunga West Line	Morningside towards Onehunga
Location

Baldwin Avenue railway station, in the suburb of Mount Albert, is on the North Auckland Line of the Auckland railway network. The station has offset side platforms connected by a level crossing.

== History ==
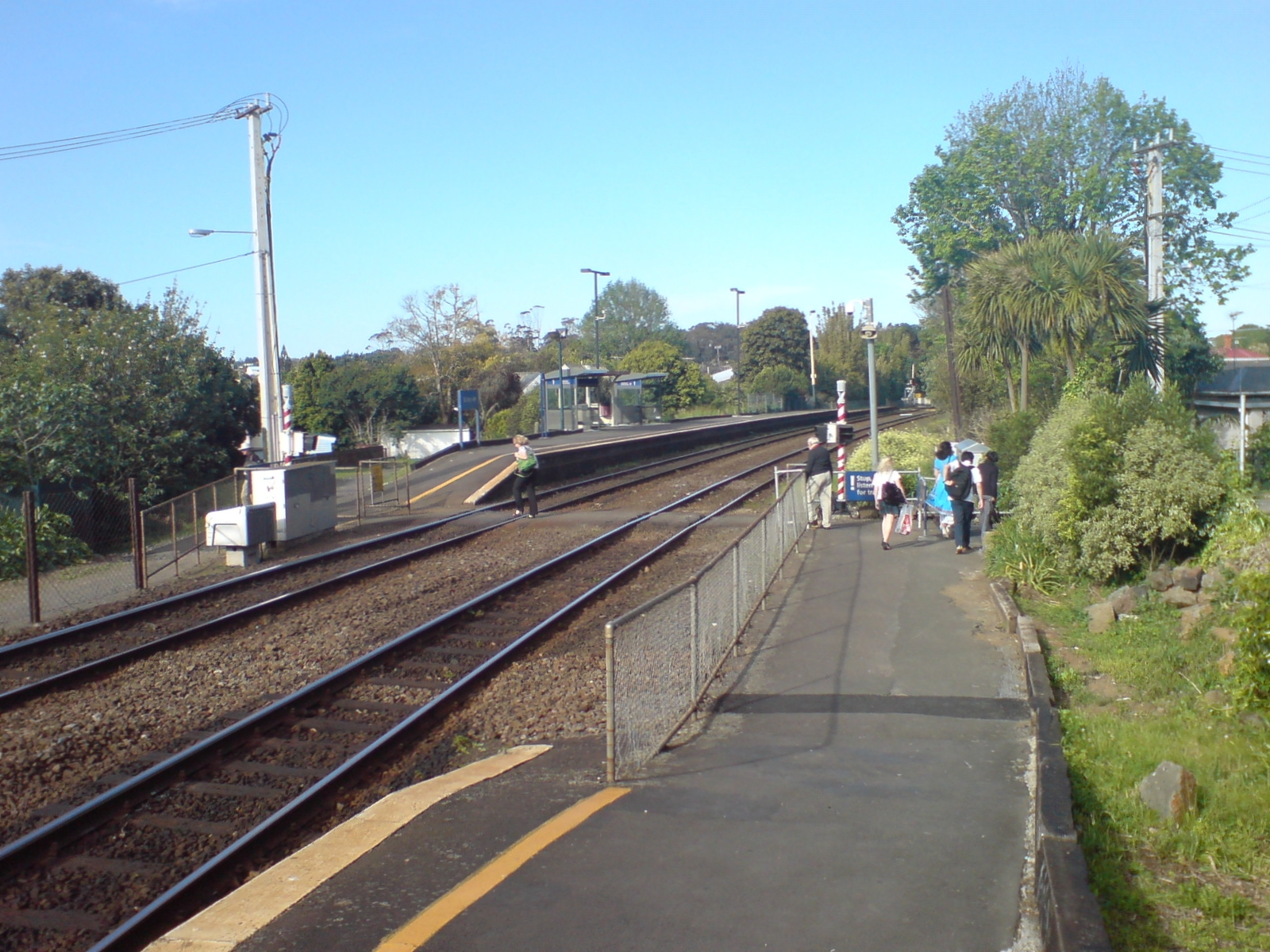
The old layout (pre-2010)

- 1907: Between 1907 and 1 June 1915, trains would halt at Avondale Road (modern-day Asquith Ave), close to the modern-day railway station.
- 1953: Opened as a wayside halt on 28 September.
- 1966: The line between Morningside and Avondale was double-tracked, leading to two new platforms being built. These platforms were off-set from each other.
- 1993: The platforms were raised to meet the standards of the new ex-Perth trains.
- 2011: An upgraded and lengthened station was opened, with the platforms directly opposite each other.
- 2026: A high school student was struck by a train at the station and died at the scene on 9 September 2026.

== Services ==
East West and Onehunga West line suburban train services are provided by Auckland One Rail on behalf of Auckland Transport.

== See also ==
- List of Auckland railway stations
