= Sylvia Park railway station =

Train station in Auckland, New Zealand

Sylvia Park
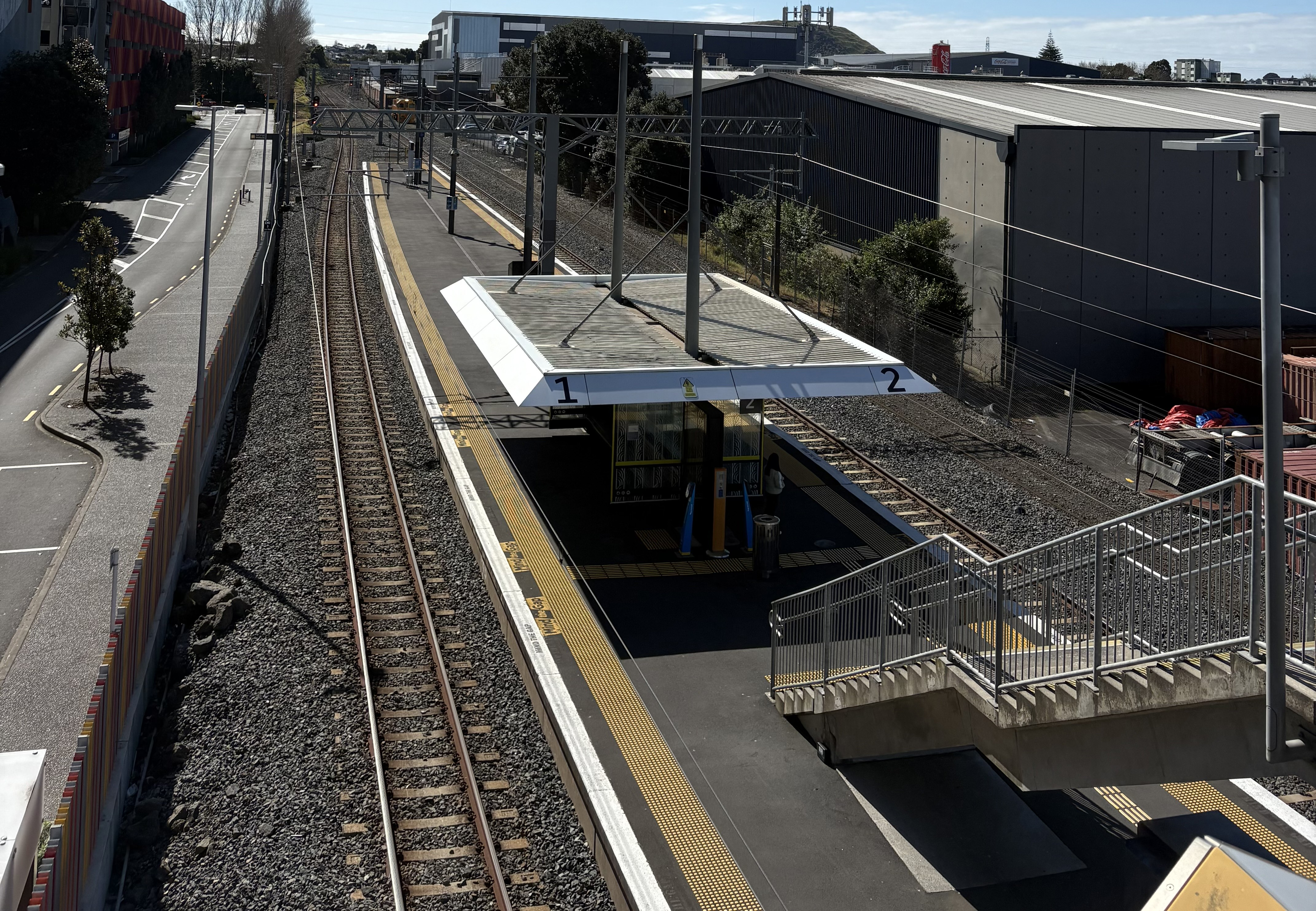
- Sylvia Park railway station in 2025

General information
- Location: Mount Wellington, Auckland; New Zealand
- Coordinates: 36.914661°S 174.842624°E
- System: Auckland Transport Urban rail
- Owner: KiwiRail (track and platforms); Auckland Transport (buildings)
- Operator: Auckland One Rail
- Line: North Island Main Trunk
- Distance: 668.13 km (415.16 mi) from Wellington
- Platforms: Island platform (P1 & P2)
- Tracks: Mainline (2)

Construction
- Parking: Yes (Sylvia Park Mall)
- Cycle facilities: Yes
- Accessible: Yes (Lifts)

Other information
- Station code: SYP
- Fare zone: Isthmus

History
- Opened: 2 July 2007; 19 years ago
- Electrified: 2014

Passengers
- CY 2018: 1,147,921 passengers

Services
Preceding station	Auckland Transport (Auckland One Rail)	Following station
Panmure towards Swanson	East West Line	Ōtāhuhu towards Manukau
Location
- 1: Sylvia Park 1929–1983, 2: Sylvia Park 2007–

Sylvia Park railway station is a station of the Auckland railway network. It is situated on the North Island Main Trunk and is served by the East West line. It serves the Sylvia Park Shopping Centre and the surrounding suburb of Mount Wellington.

== History ==
The original railway station was constructed, along with five others, on 1 September 1929. The station opened to goods traffic initially and eventually opened to all traffic in November the following year. It was situated to the west of Mount Wellington Highway, on the route of the Westfield Deviation. The deviation was built to divert the Auckland–Westfield section of the North Island Main Trunk line (NIMT) via a flatter and faster eastern route to link up with the original NIMT tracks at Westfield Junction.

The old station was closed to goods traffic on 22 January 1966, then completely on 6 March 1983. After this a private siding was still in use.

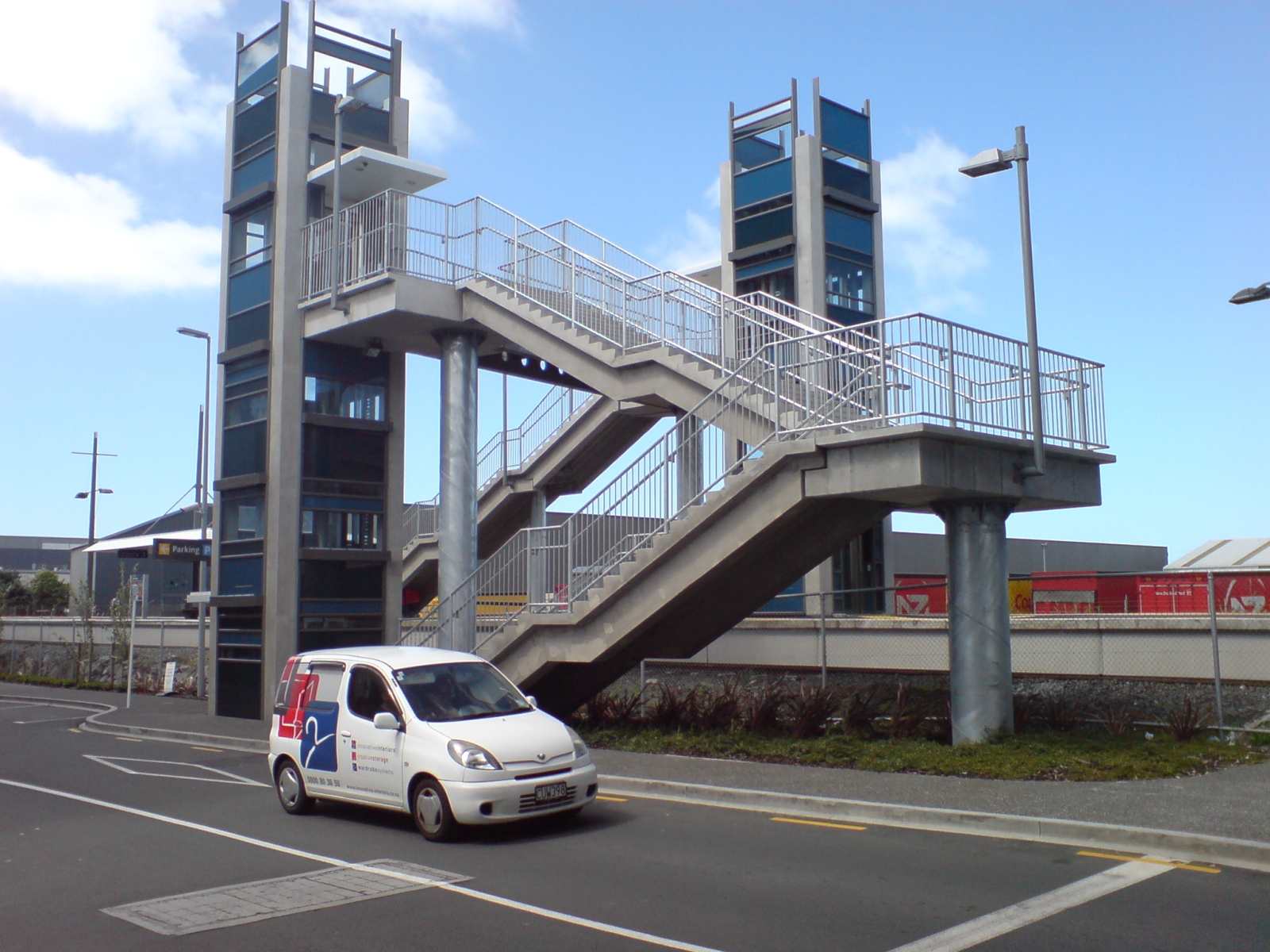
The elevators and bridges connecting to the island platform

The new Sylvia Park station was funded by the builders of the Sylvia Park Shopping Centre, located next to the station, and built by ARTNL/ARTA. It opened to the public on 2 July 2007. The station cost NZ$5 million to build.

The station has a fairly high patronage, with many people travelling to shop at the Sylvia Park Shopping Centre.

A paid park and ride service, operated privately by Kiwi Property, was introduced at the mall in 2020. The service must be booked in advance.

Due to Stage 2 of the Rail Network Rebuild, the Eastern Line between Ōtahuhu and Britomart (which included Sylvia Park station) was temporarily closed for major track renewal work between March 2023 and January 2024.

== Services ==
Sylvia Park is located in the Isthmus fare zone.

Auckland One Rail, on behalf of Auckland Transport, operates East West services to Swanson and Manukau.

Rail replacement bus stops are also located near the station.

== See also ==
- List of Auckland railway stations
- Public transport in Auckland
