= Mount Albert railway station =

Train station in Auckland, New Zealand

Mount Albert
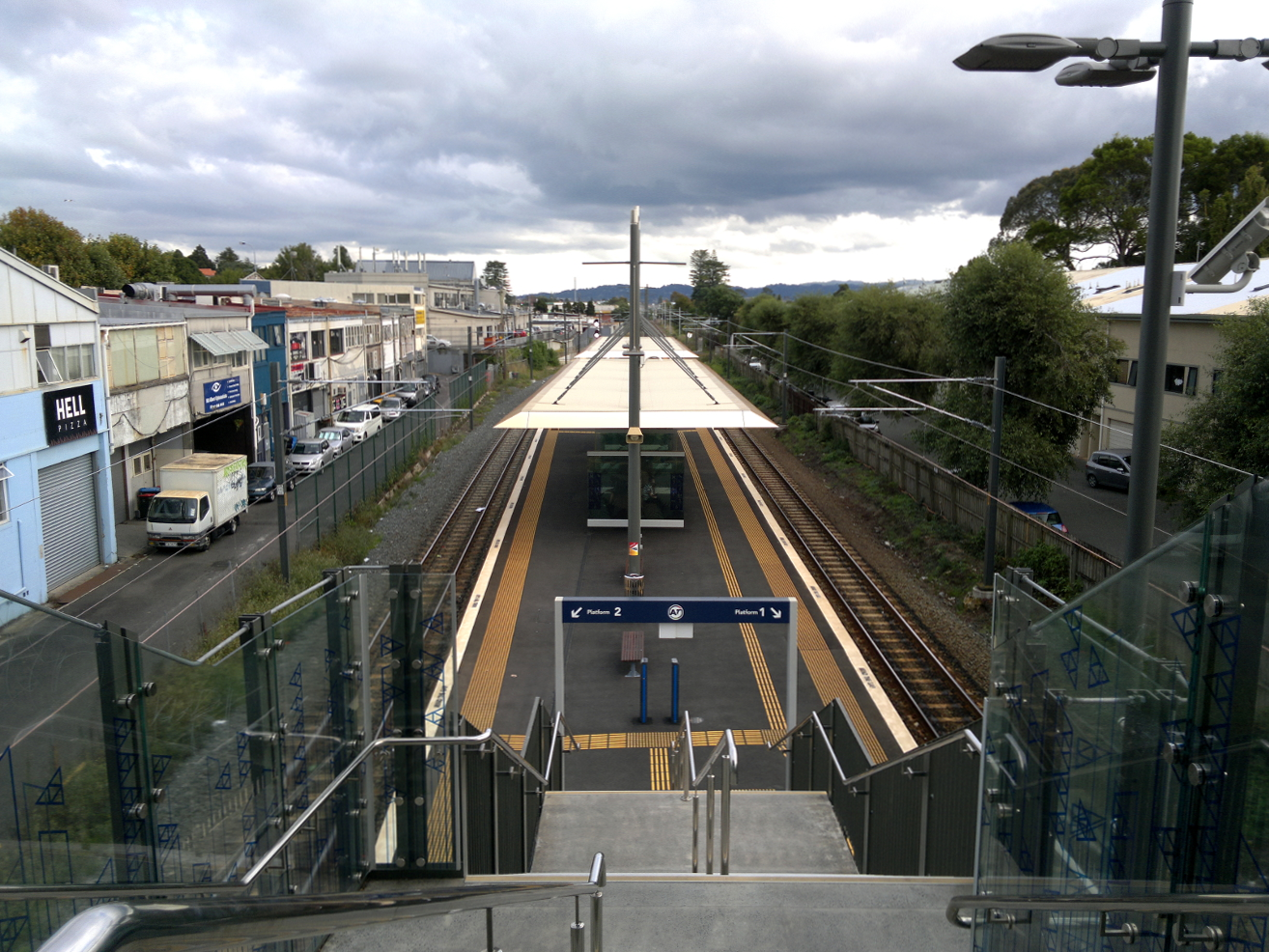
- Looking down at the station platform from the Carrington Road and New North Road concourse entrances.

General information
- Location: Mount Albert, Auckland; New Zealand
- Coordinates: 36°53.1′S 174°42.8′E
- System: Auckland Transport Urban rail
- Owner: KiwiRail (track and platforms); Auckland Transport (buildings)
- Operator: Auckland One Rail
- Line: North Auckland Line
- Distance: 15.27 km (9.49 mi) from Westfield Junction
- Platforms: Island platform (P1 & P2)
- Tracks: Mainline (2)

Construction
- Parking: No
- Cycle facilities: Yes
- Accessible: Yes (Lifts)

Other information
- Fare zone: Isthmus

History
- Opened: 29 March 1880
- Rebuilt: December 2012
- Electrified: 20 July 2015

Passengers
- 2009: 1,951 passengers/day

Services
Preceding station	Auckland Transport (Auckland One Rail)	Following station
Avondale towards Swanson	East West Line	Baldwin Avenue towards Manukau
Avondale towards Henderson	Onehunga West Line	Baldwin Avenue towards Onehunga
Location

Mount Albert railway station is in the suburb of Mount Albert on the North Auckland Line of the Auckland railway network in New Zealand. It has an island platform reached by a footbridge from Carrington Road at the northern end, an overbridge from New North Road on the eastern side, and a subway that runs between Willcott Street and New North Road at the southern end.

== History ==
- 1880: Opened as one of the original stations on the North Auckland Line.
- 1880s–1920s: New Zealand Railways operates the Mount Albert Quarry with a branch running from immediately north of the station to the nearby volcanic cone.
- 1908: The station building was destroyed by fire.
- 1910: A new station building was built.
- 1914: The Mt Albert 30-lever Signal Box was built.
- 1966: The line was double-tracked and the station was rebuilt.
- 1973: The 30-lever signal box was moved to the MOTAT when control of the trains became centralised at the Auckland railway station.
- 2002: Two steel-framed shelters are built.
- 2010: Significant discussion, including during the run-up to the local body elections, considered the station (and especially its access-ways and weather shelters) as dilapidated and in need of renewal. Also particularly criticised were the run-down shop rear areas fronting the railway station from the New North Road side. A former Auckland City councilor suggested that a green wall would offer an option to hide these unsightly areas behind low-cost, low-maintenance planting.
- 2013: The station was upgraded as part of a 2-stage Auckland Transport programme in anticipation of the Auckland railway electrification project. The $9 million upgrade, which included an overhead covered walkway from Carrington Road, new passenger shelters, and other enhancements, was ceremonially opened in July 2013. The second stage, which was to include a $1.23 million overbridge walkway to New North Road, was scheduled to be completed by August 2016.
- 2016: The overbridge, connecting the station directly to the pedestrian precinct of the Mount Albert shopping area, was opened on 17 September 2016.

== Services ==
East West and Onehunga West line suburban train services are provided by Auckland One Rail on behalf of Auckland Transport.

== See also ==
- List of Auckland railway stations
- Public transport in Auckland
