= Avondale railway station, Auckland =

Train station in New Zealand

Coordinates: 36°53′49.34″S 174°41′56.86″E

Avondale
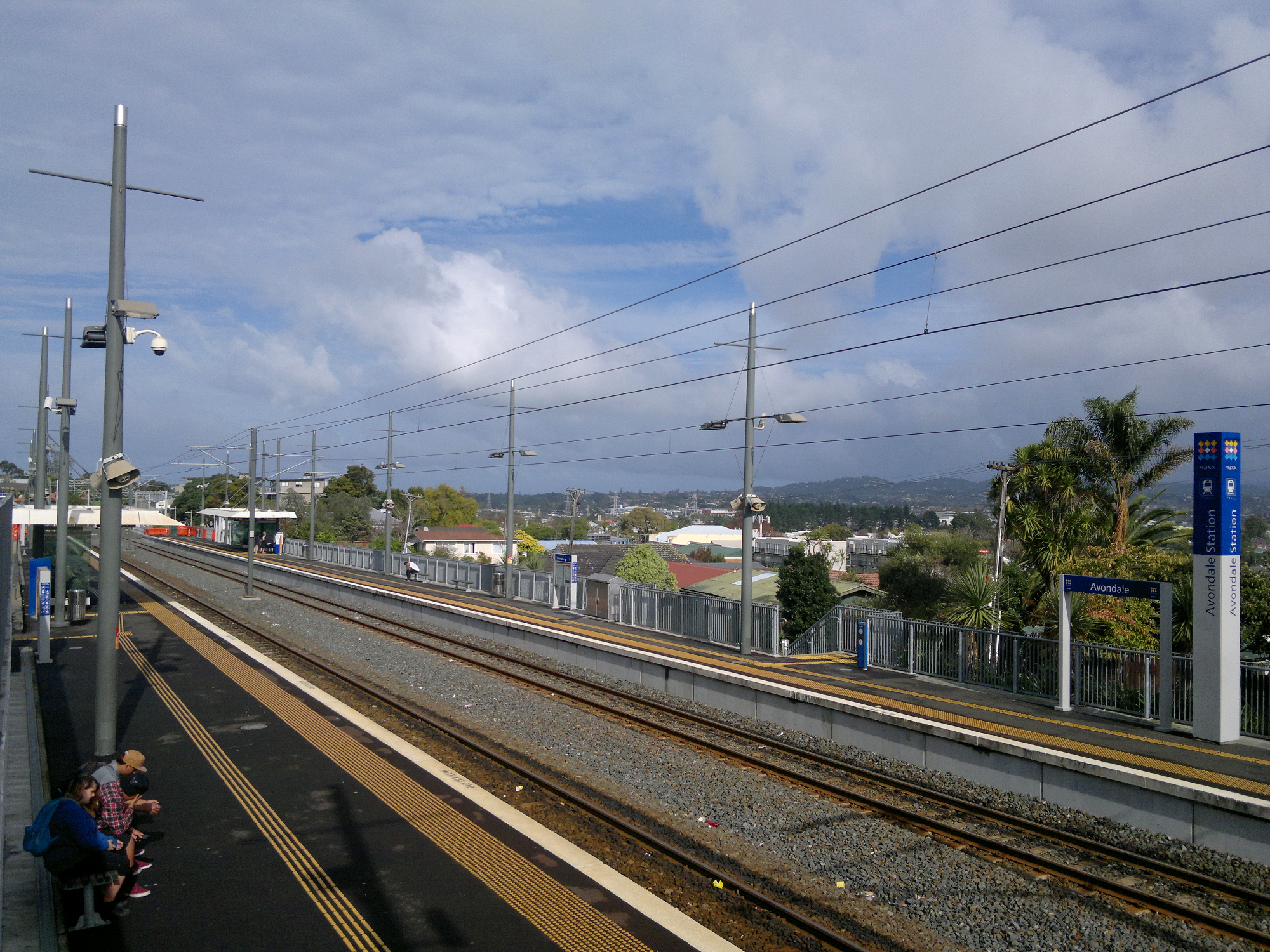

General information
- Location: Avondale, Auckland; New Zealand
- System: Auckland Transport Urban rail
- Owner: KiwiRail (track and platforms); Auckland Transport (buildings)
- Operator: Auckland One Rail
- Line: North Auckland Line
- Distance: 17.23 km (10.71 mi) from Westfield Junction
- Platforms: Side platforms (P1 & P2)
- Tracks: Mainline (2)

Construction
- Parking: Street parking only
- Cycle facilities: Yes
- Accessible: Yes

Other information
- Station code: AVD
- Fare zone: Isthmus

History
- Opened: 29 March 1880
- Rebuilt: 14 June 2010
- Electrified: 20 July 2015

Passengers
- 2009: 1,206 passengers/day

Services
Preceding station	Auckland Transport (Auckland One Rail)	Following station
New Lynn towards Swanson	East West Line	Mount Albert towards Manukau
New Lynn towards Henderson	Onehunga West Line	Mount Albert towards Onehunga
Location

Avondale railway station is on the East West and Onehunga West lines of the Auckland railway network. Relocated in 2008, the station can be accessed from St Jude St, Layard St, and Crayford St.

The proposed Avondale–Southdown Line would connect to the Western Line just east of the station.

== History ==
- 1880: Opened as one of the original stations on the North Auckland Line. The station was known as Whau for the first two years of its existence.
- 1882: A post office opened as part of the station.
- 1912: The post office closed.
- 1914: The platform was upgraded to an island platform layout with a new building on the new platform.
- 1915: A signal box was added.
- 1966: The line to Morningside was double-tracked.
- 1967: The signal box was removed after this section changed to centralised traffic control.
- 1993: The platform was raised to meet the requirements of ex-Perth trains.
- 1995: The station building was relocated to Swanson. Originally planned for demolition due to its poor state, Waitakere Community Board members Dave Harré and Penny Hulse lobbied the New Zealand Railways Corporation to save and refurbish the building.
- 2008: The footbridge was demolished, the platform removed and a temporary station erected 50m to the east of the site.
- 2010: A new station was constructed and the line double-tracked westward beyond Avondale. The station opened on 14 June.
- 2014: Platforms extended to 150m from 143m for the new electric AM class EMU trains.

== Upgrade and relocation ==
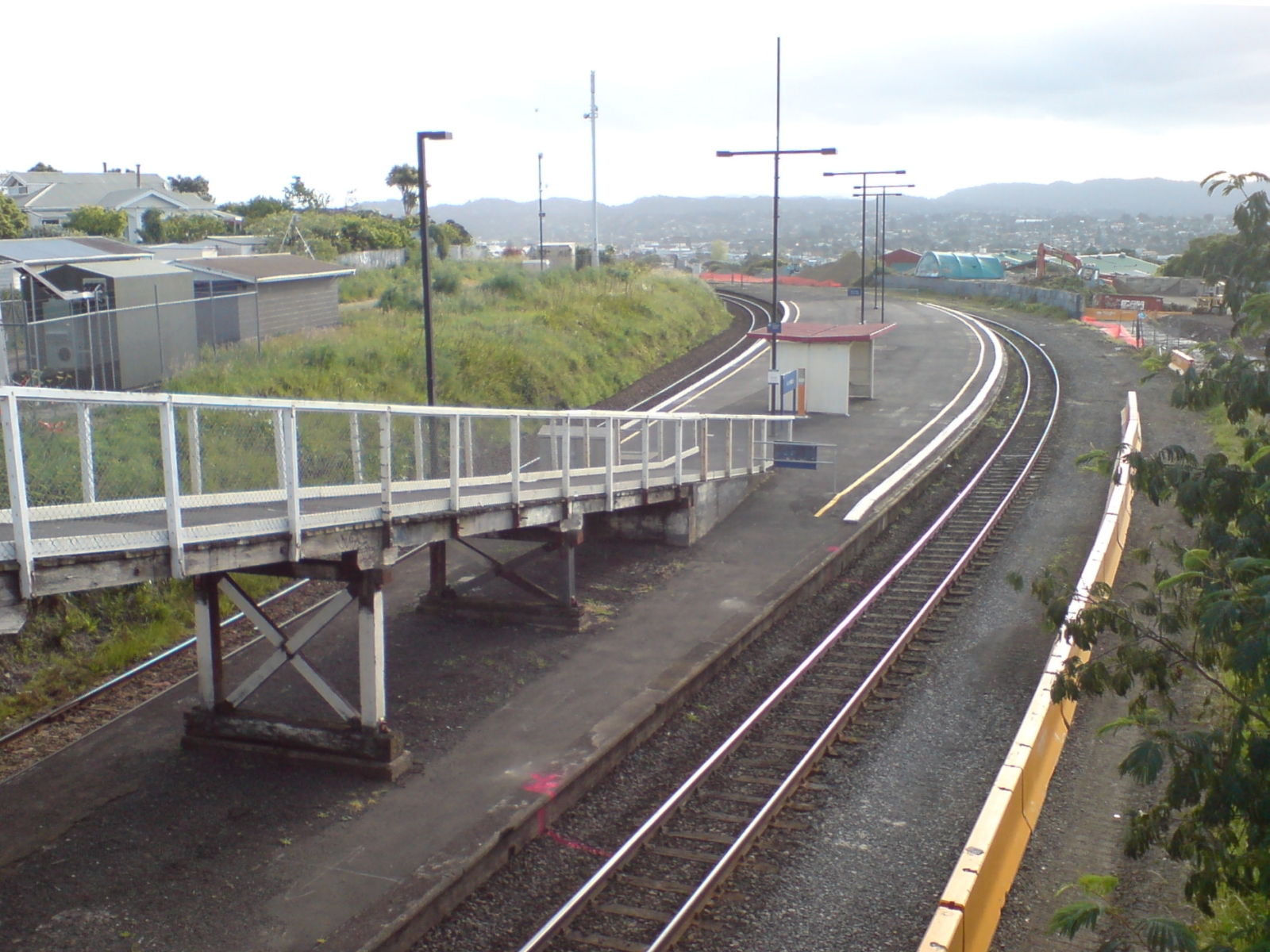
The old station just prior to demolition at the end of 2008. The new station is located around the bend to the left.

Until 26 December 2008 it had an island platform just west of Blockhouse Bay Road, reached via a footbridge off the road. In 2010 an upgraded station was built on Layard Street, north of the St Jude Street level crossing and approximately 100m west and 200m south of the old station.

The new station provides better connections with the Avondale town centre and the platform is on a straight section of track, unlike the old platform which was on a large sharp curve.

Electrification work was completed and the station began serving electric trains in 2015.

== Services ==
East West and Onehunga West line suburban train services are provided by Auckland One Rail on behalf of Auckland Transport.

A number of bus routes pass nearby on Great North Road, Rosebank Road and Blockhouse Bay Road. These include routes 18, 22N, 22R, 67A, 67B, 67X, 149, 151, 171X, 191, 195, 209, 221, and 223.

== See also ==
- List of Auckland railway stations
