= Northwest Busway =

Busway project that is under construction

Overview
- Native name: Te Ara Hauāuru
- Status: Under construction / Staged rollout
- Owner: NZ Transport Agency Waka Kotahi
- Locale: West Auckland / Northwest Auckland
- Termini: Brigham Creek; Auckland Central Business District
- Stations: 7

Service
- Type: Bus rapid transit
- System: AT Metro
- Services: WX1 (Western Express)
- Operator: Auckland Transport

History
- Opened: November 2023 (Interim motorway shoulder lanes); August 2026 (Westgate Te Waiarohia Station); 2027 (Dedicated bidirectional construction start)

Technical
- Line length: 18 km

The Northwest Busway – Te Ara Hauāuru, is an 18-kilometre rapid transit corridor under development along the Northwestern Motorway in Auckland, New Zealand, designed to link northwestern suburbs to the city centre. Interim services began in November 2023 with the WX1 route, followed by the opening of Westgate Te Waiarohia Station in August 2026.

The busway is expected to move 9,000 passengers per hour in each direction once fully opened.

== History ==
Population growth and vehicle dependency caused severe congestion on State Highway 16. In 2012, a proposal for a busway along the Northwestern Motorway was included in Auckland Transport's Regional Public Transport plan.

Work on an initial $50 million interim "pop-up" busway project, jointly managed by Auckland Transport and Waka Kotahi, began in 2021, intended as a temporary solution to convert motorway shoulders into continuous bus lanes ahead of long-term rapid transit. Originally scheduled to open in late 2022, the interim project was delayed by up to nine months to mid-2023 due to Auckland's COVID-19 Alert Level 4 lockdowns, restricted access to the motorway corridor, and adverse weather conditions.

In November 2023, the upgraded interim shoulder lanes and restructured express bus network officially launched alongside the new WX1 service.

In late 2024, NZTA approved $116 million of funding towards consenting work and land acquisitions toward the Brigham Creek and Lincoln Road stations.

In 2025, the complete busway was expected to cost at least $4.4 billion, with the third stage of construction including the Point Chevalier and Western Springs stations not expected to begin until after 2035.

Following a brief clash between NZTA and Auckland Council over consenting issues, statutory approvals for the permanent corridor were granted under the Fast-Track Approvals Act in September 2026, with main construction expected from 2027. Delivery was expected to be staged over 20 years.

== Infrastructure and stations ==
The network is planned to feature 7 stations, of which 1 has been opened.

=== Brigham Creek / Rarawaru ===
Brigham Creek (Rarawaru in Māori) is a future busway station that will include a park and ride facility. Construction is scheduled to begin in 2027.

=== Westgate / Te Waiarohia ===
Westgate / Te Waiarohia is a busway station located located along Gunton Drive. Construction began in mid-2025, and the station was officially opened in August 2026. It was expected to serve 1,000 passengers per day at opening, with over 4,500 daily passengers expected by 2031.

=== Royal Road / Mānutewhau ===
Royal Road / Mānutewhau is a future busway station planned for stage two of busway construction.

=== Lincoln Road / Wai o Pareira ===
Lincoln Road / Wai o Pareira is a future busway station planned for stage one of busway construction.

=== Te Atatū / Ōrangihina ===
Te Atatū / Ōrangihina is a future busway station planned for stage two of busway construction.

=== Point Chevalier ===
Point Chevalier is a future busway station planned for stage three of busway construction.

=== Western Springs ===
Western Springs is a future busway station planned for stage three of busway construction.

== Services ==
The primary service is the Western Express (WX1), running daily with high frequency and providing rapid transit times between Westgate and the city centre. The service recorded 113,200 passenger trips in May 2026.
