= Public transport in Auckland =

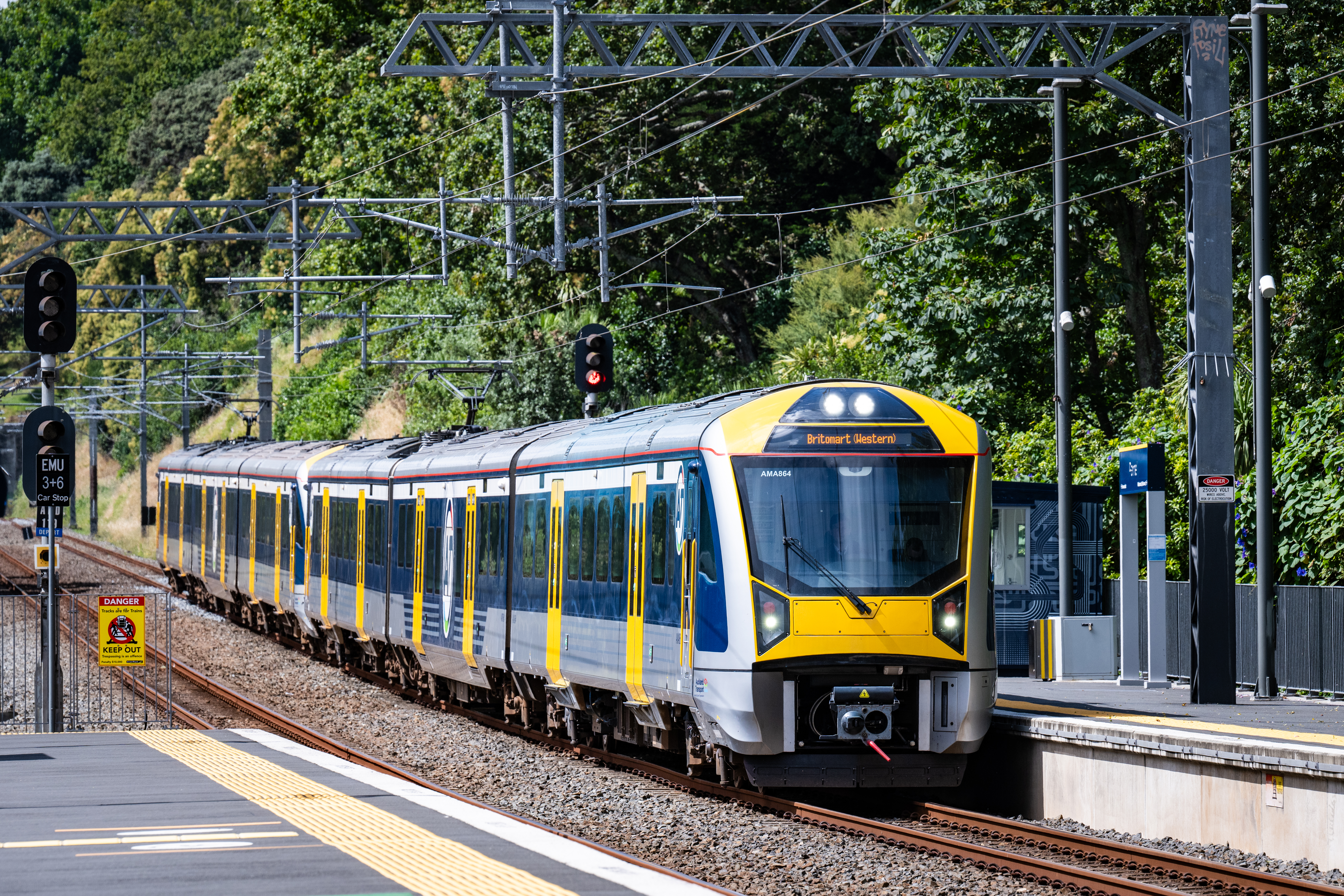
- An AT AM class train at Parnell station

Overview
- Area served: Auckland metropolitan area
- Locale: Auckland region
- Transit type: Commuter rail, bus, ferry
- Annual ridership: 92 million (2025/26); Bus: 72.6 million; Train: 14.4 million; Ferry: 5 million
- Website: at.govt.nz

Operation
- Operators: Auckland One Rail; Bayes Coachlines; Kinetic Group (Go Bus, NZ Bus); Howick and Eastern Buses; Ritchies Transport (Ritchies, Ritchies-Murphy & Pavlovich Transport Solutions); Tranzit Group (Tranzurban Auckland); Belaire Ferries; Explore Group; Fullers360 (Waiheke Bus Company); SeaLink NZ
System map
Interactive map showing rapid transit lines in Auckland. Proposed lines are shown in grey.

A two-minute animation of a day's activity on Auckland's public transport network

Public transport in Auckland, New Zealand comprises a network of bus, train, and ferry services that operate across the country’s largest metropolitan area. Services are coordinated by Auckland Transport (AT) under the AT and AT Metro brands, with Waitematā and Te Waihorotiu railway stations serving as the city’s main hubs.

Historically, Auckland had one of the country’s most extensive tram systems, but investment in motorways and the dismantling of trams in the mid‑20th century led to a sharp decline in public transport use. By the 1990s, patronage had fallen to some of the lowest levels among comparable cities.

Since the early 2000s, major projects — such as the Northern Express bus rapid transit line, the electrification of the commuter rail network, and the introduction of the AT HOP card — have increased provision of rapid transit services and supported a sustained recovery in ridership. A region‑wide redesign of bus routes in the 2010s further improved access to frequent services.

Developments in the 2020s shifted even more weight towards the commuter rail network as a major part of Auckland's public transport system. A twin tunnel/subway connection under the central business district, alongside two new underground train stations, were opened in 2026. These metro-like tunnels were known during their decade-long construction as the City Rail Link. They dramatically converted Auckland's previously dead-ended (thus limited and infrequent) rail network into a rapid-transit thoroughfare system with the capacity for high-frequency train services.

Ongoing initiatives — such as the construction of new bus rapid transit infrastructure (the Eastern Busway and the Northwest Busway), and the removal of level crossings for full grade separation of the commuter rail system — aim to expand capacity and provide faster, more reliable connections as Auckland continues to grow.

== History ==
=== 19th and 20th century ===
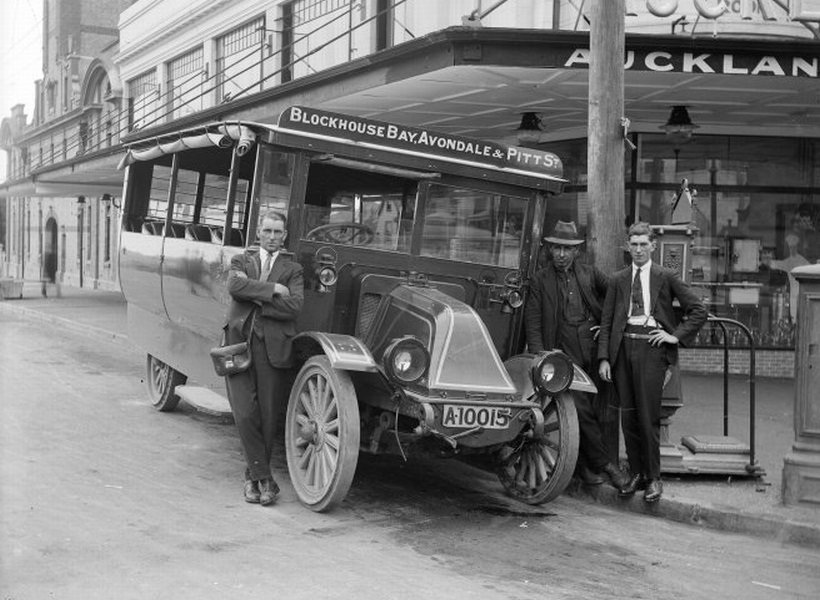
An Auckland bus in the 1920s

Auckland electric tramlines 1900 to 1960

Horse-drawn trams operated in Auckland from 1884. The Auckland Electric Tram Company's system was officially opened on 17 November 1902. The Electric Tram Company started as a private company before being acquired by Auckland City Council.

The tram network enabled and shaped much of Auckland's growth throughout the early 20th century. Auckland's public transport system was very well utilised, with usage peaking at over 120 million boardings during the Second World War, when Auckland's population was less than 500,000.

Following dissatisfaction from suburban boroughs and town districts with how the tramway was being managed by the Auckland City Council a Royal Commission inquiry was held. The inquiry led to the creation of the Auckland Transport Board in 1928, which managed the tramway system in the greater Auckland urban area. The Auckland Transport Board expanded the system from 1930 to 1932 with services extending to Meadowbank, Point Chevalier, Dominion Road, Three Kings, and Avondale.

Despite governance and service quality issues, public transport was profitable from the institution of the Auckland Transport Board to 1956.

Auckland's extensive tram network was removed in the 1950s, with the last line closing in late 1956. Although a series of ambitious rail schemes were proposed between the 1940s and 1970s, the focus of transport improvements in Auckland shifted to developing an extensive motorway system. Passionate advocacy from long-time Mayor of Auckland City Council Dove-Myer Robinson for a "rapid rail" scheme was ultimately unsuccessful.

Removal of the tram system, little investment in Auckland's rail network and growing car ownership in the second half of the 20th century led to a collapse in ridership across all modes of public transport. From a 1954 average level of 290 public transport trips per person per year (a share of 58% of all motorised trips), patronage decreased rapidly. 1950s patronage levels were only reached again in the 2010s, despite Auckland's population growing four-fold over the same time period.

These decisions also shaped Auckland's growth patterns in the late 20th century, with the city becoming a relatively low-density dispersed urban area with a population highly dependent on private vehicles for their travel needs. By the late 1990s ongoing population growth and high levels of car use were leading to the recognition that traffic congestion was one of Auckland's biggest problems.

=== 21st century ===
As concerns over urban sprawl and traffic congestion grew in the 1990s and early 2000s, public transport returned to the spotlight, with growing agreement of the "need for a substantial shift to public transport". Growing recognition that Auckland could no longer "build its way out of congestion" through more roads alone led to the first major improvements to Auckland's public transport system in half a century:

- Britomart Station, now known as Waitematā, was opened in 2003, the first major upgrade of Auckland's rail network since World War II. This project allowed trains to reach into the heart of Auckland's city centre and acted as a catalyst for the regeneration of this part of downtown Auckland.
- The Northern Busway was opened in 2008, providing Auckland's North Shore with rapid transit that enabled bus riders to avoid congestion on the Northern Motorway.
- A core upgrade of Auckland's rail network between 2006 and 2011, known as Project DART, which included double-tracking of the Western Line, the reopening of the Onehunga Branch line to Onehunga, a rail spur to Manukau City and a series of station upgrades.
- Electrification of the Auckland rail network and the purchase of new electric trains from Spanish manufacturer CAF. Electric train services commenced in 2014. All remaining diesel services, last used on a shuttle service, were phased out in 2022.
- A complete redesign of the region's bus networks between 2012 and 2019 which significantly expanded "frequent" service and reduced duplication.
- Implementation of an integrated ticketing and multi-modal fares system, through the AT HOP card and contactless payments.
- Electric AT buses and depots began replacing diesel in 2020. In 2025 there were 314 zero-emission buses, including multiple double-deckers.
- The City Rail Link opened in 2026, along with two new city centre stations.

Despite these improvements, the lack of investment in Auckland's public transport system throughout the latter part of the 20th century means the city still has much lower levels of ridership than other major cities in Canada and Australia.

In 2018 the government and Auckland Council released the Auckland Transport Alignment Project (ATAP), valued at NZ$28 billion over 10 years. Of this, NZ$8.4 billion was for rapid transit projects, including the completion of the City Rail Link; the construction of the Eastern Busway, the Northern Busway extension to Albany; the extension of the railway electrification to Pukekohe; and a third main line between Westfield and Wiri, to separate freight trains from passenger trains; further new electric trains and the construction of a new light rail line, the City Centre–Māngere Line. The newly elected coalition government cancelled the project in January 2024.

== Buses ==
=== Auckland Transport (AT) services ===
A CRRC electric double-decker bus with 2025 AT Western Express livery

A CRRC electric bus with 2025 AT branding

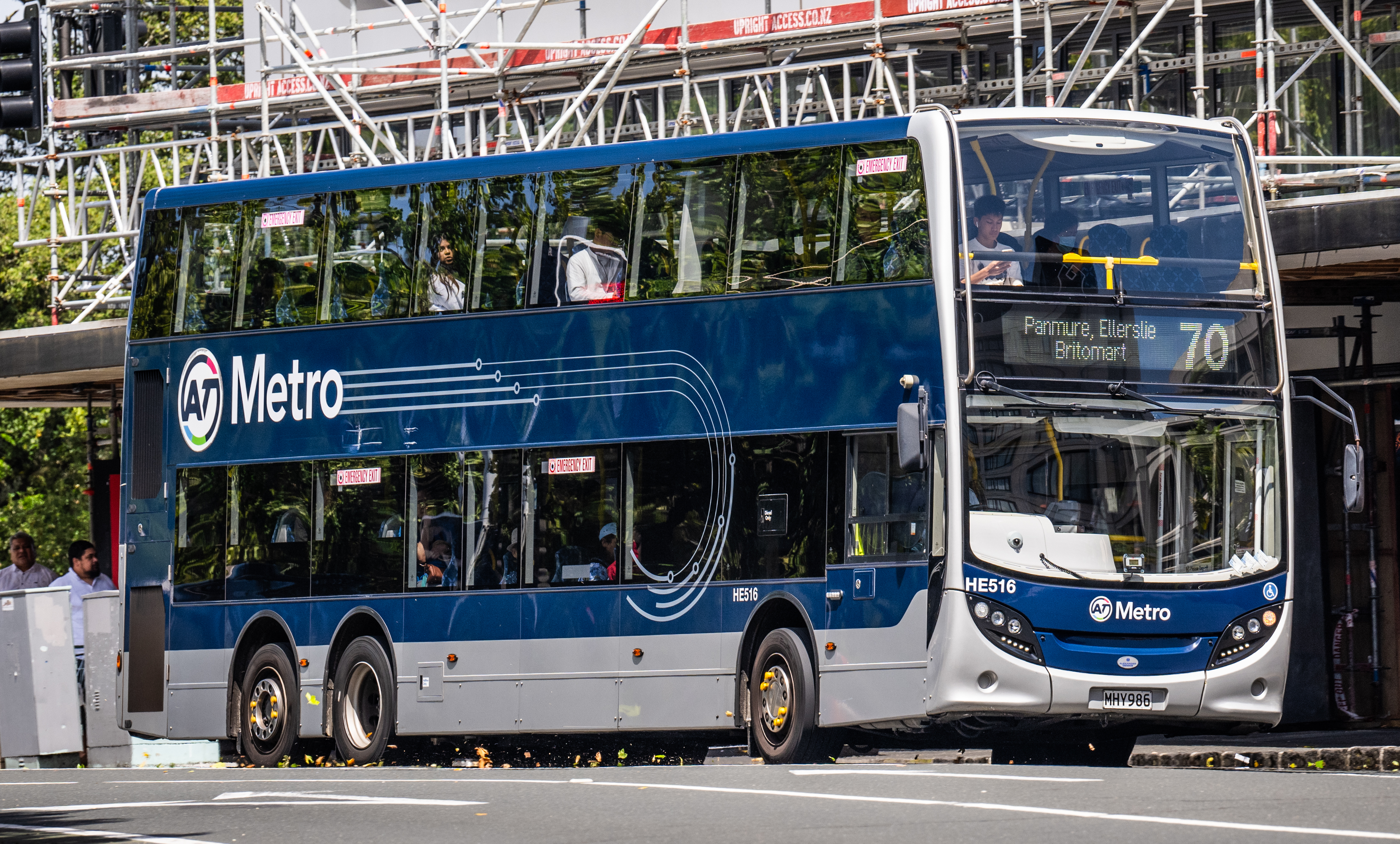
An Alexander Dennis Enviro500 MMC double-decker bus

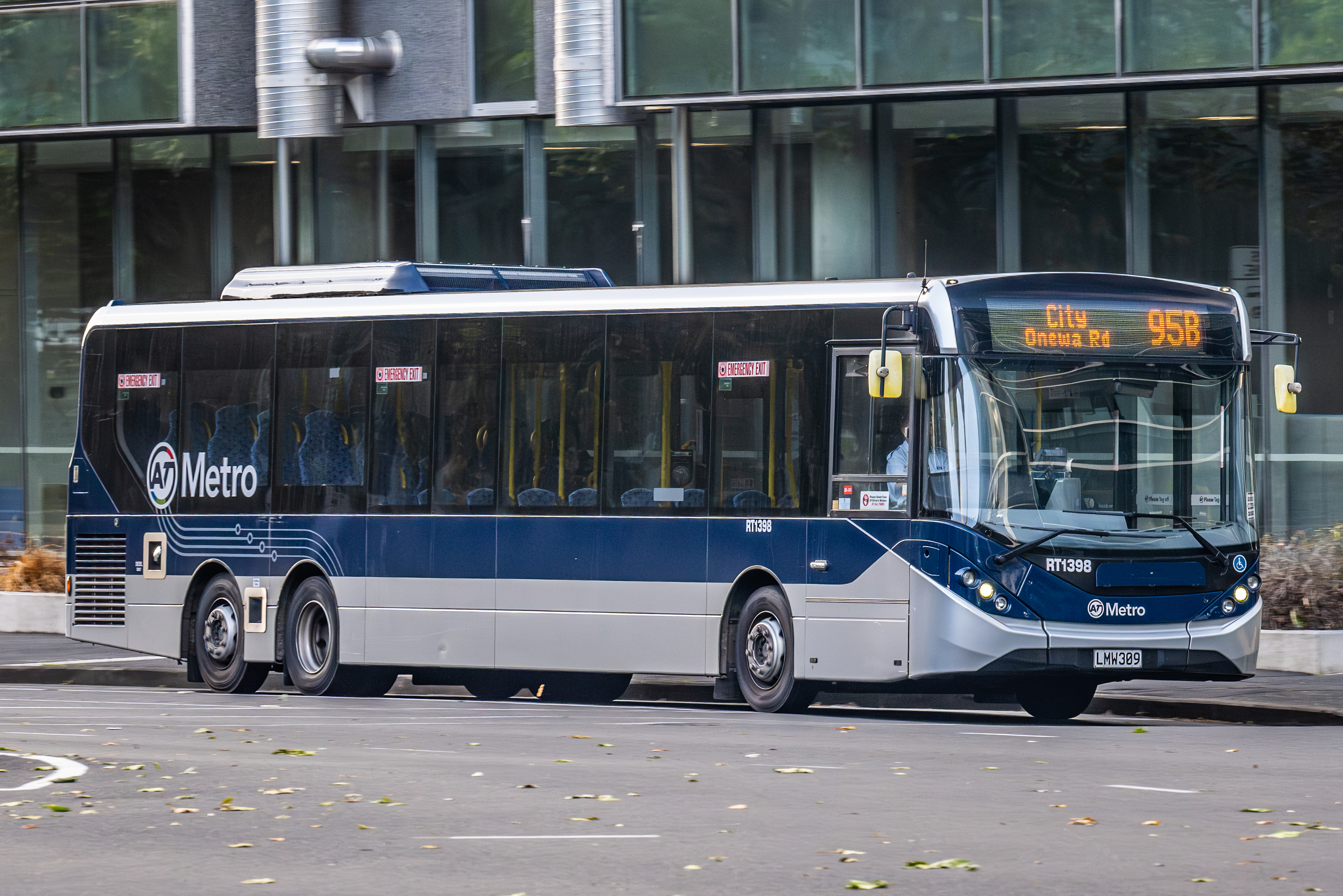
Alexander Dennis Enviro200 XLB in the Auckland CBD

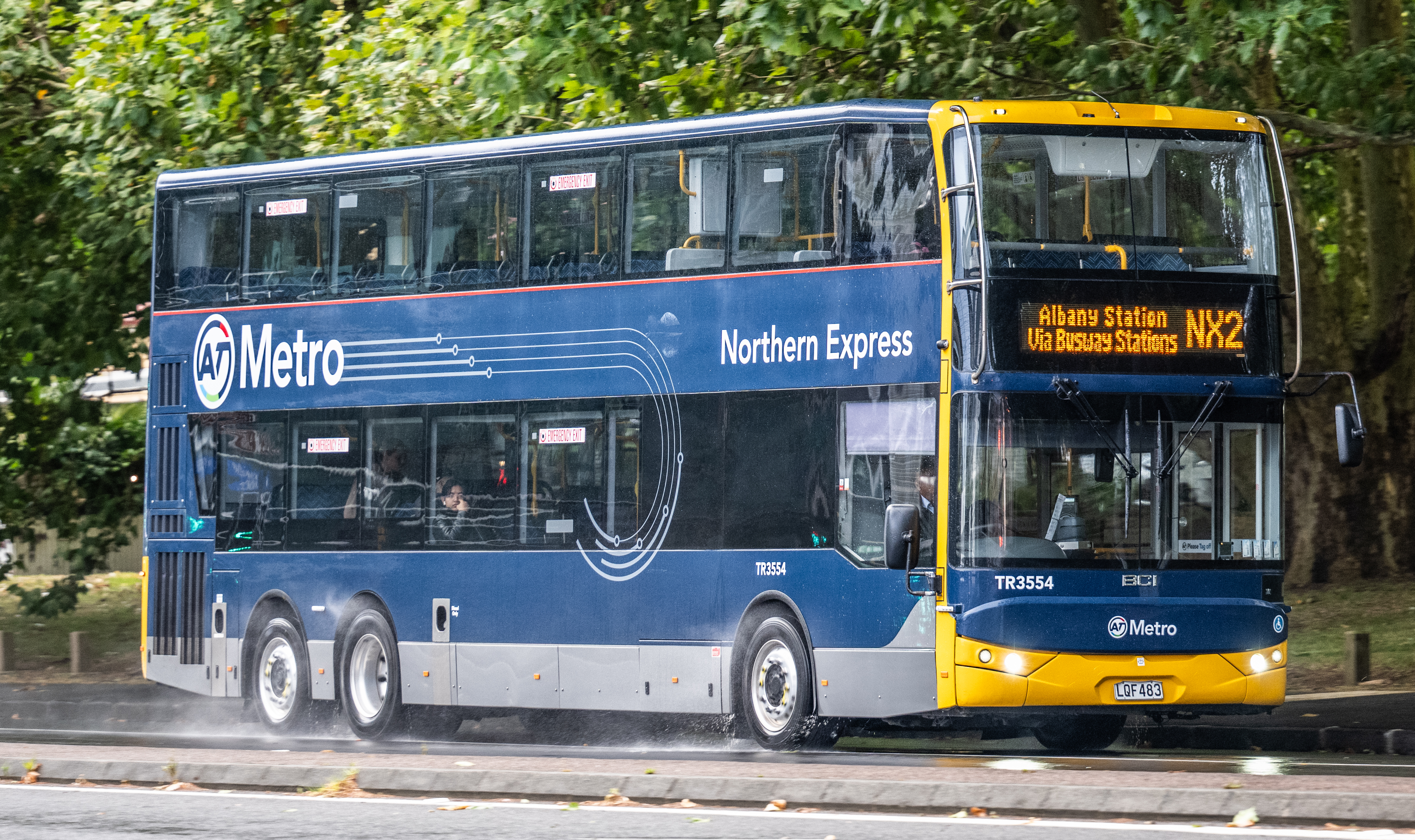
A BCI CitiRider operating as a Northern Express service

Buses provide for around 80% of public transport trips in Auckland. Auckland Transport, the principal city-council-controlled organisation responsible for public transport, operates a total bus fleet of roughly 1,350 vehicles across its metropolitan network.

Auckland has express bus rapid transit lines which connect the northern and western suburbs of Auckland to the central city. The NX1 and NX2 serve the North Shore and uses the Northern Busway, which opened in 2008. As of 2026, two additional bus rapid transit lines, the 70 route on the Eastern Busway and the WX1 on the Northwest Busway, are currently under construction or partially completed. There is also one partially grade-segregated rapid bus line (running partially on dedicated bus lanes), the Airport Link, which, by connecting Auckland International Airport to Puhinui railway station, serves as the primary public-transport service to the airport.

Most routes are classified as either "frequent", "connector" or "local", with distinguishing features being minimum baseline standards for frequencies and operating hours. Bus services classed as frequent generally run from around 6am to midnight and are required to operate at least every 15 minutes from 7 am to 7 pm. Four non-grade-separated routes are branded with special names and coloured livery – the CityLink (red livery), InnerLink (green livery), OuterLink (orange livery), and TamakiLink (blue livery) – since they serve the inner city and its immediate margins with particularly frequent services. The AirportLink is an additional fifth frequent service that uses the "Link" branding with special livery.

For weekend services, a limited number of buses link Auckland's suburbs and city centre after midnight on Friday and Saturday nights only, with Northern Express services on the Northern Busway on the North Shore running half-hourly until 3:00 a.m.

Services are contracted by Auckland Transport (AT) and operated by a number of private companies, including:

- Bayes Coachlines – only operates 989 Milldale loop.
- Go Bus - operates services in South and East Auckland as well as Hibiscus Coast
- Howick & Eastern Buses - operates services in East Auckland
- NZ Bus - operates services in North, West and Central Auckland
- Ritchies Transport - operates services in North, West and South Auckland
- Tranzurban Auckland (Tranzit Group) – contracted operator of NX2 services on the Northern Busway. Also operates Western Express, 11T, 11W and 12 (previously 120) after April 2025 changes.
- Waiheke Bus Company (by Fullers360, 5 routes)

AT began rebranding bus services to AT Metro in 2014–2015 to create a single identity for all bus services, with some exceptions like the Link buses which retained their red, green and orange livery.

In 2023, AT began decommissioning the AT Metro brand, replacing it with the refreshed AT brand identity. The livery colours were initially retained. In 2025, Māori design elements, including a Tangaroa figure, were introduced and also a lighter, vibrant blue for the Western Express electric double-decker fleet.

There are five Link services; all accept fare payment by AT HOP card or bank card and all run from early morning to late evening, 7 days of the week.

- CityLink – red electric buses; Wynyard Quarter – Queen Street – Karangahape Road
- InnerLink – green buses – both way loop; Britomart (Waitematā) – Parnell – Newmarket – Karangahape Road – Ponsonby Road – Victoria Park – Britomart (Waitematā).
- OuterLink – amber buses; Newmarket – Parnell – Wellesley Street – Herne Bay – Westmere – Mount Albert – St Lukes.
- TāmakiLink – light blue electric buses; Britomart (Waitematā) – Spark Arena – Kelly Tarlton's Sea Life Aquarium – Mission Bay – Kohimarama Beach – St Heliers Bay – Glen Innes.
- AirportLink – orange electric buses; Manukau – Puhinui – Auckland Airport

The Manukau Bus Station (next to Manukau Train Station) was officially opened in April 2018 and bus services from the facility began, serving South and East Auckland. Since the central crosstown bus changes in November 2024, the OuterLink now operates a non-loop design route.

==== Airport services ====
The AirportLink bus provides a connection to train services at Puhinui Station which lies on the South City Line and East West Line. It also serves Manukau Station. Bus 38 connects the Airport to Māngere and Onehunga.

==== Night services ====
There are a total of 26 routes as part of the Night Bus, Northern Express and Western Express bus services which operate on Friday and Saturday nights between the hours of 00:00 and 03:30. Most routes depart the city centre on an hourly basis although the Northern Express bus route NX1 is more frequent. The night bus services were paused during COVID but returned on 2 December 2021 when AT's Group Manager Metro Services Stacey van der Putten noted that AT was "bringing back a wide range of our 'Night Buses' services this weekend to help support our city's hospitality sector and to make it easier for town-goers and hospitality workers alike to get home safely and affordably in the early hours."

Some Night Buses run extensions of their primary route, most notably, routes 18, 82 and 94. Route 18 extends to Henderson via Great North Road, 82 extends to Browns Bay via East Coast Bays & 94 extends to Smales Farm via Glenfield.

==== Busiest routes ====
The following table shows the 20 busiest bus routes in Auckland by boardings from July 2025 to June 2026.

Rank	Route	Description	Annual patronage (2025/26)
1	NX1	Albany Station to City Centre (Lower Albert Street) via Northern Busway	4,671,417
2	70	Botany to Waitematā Station via Panmure	3,684,412
3	NX2	Hibiscus Coast Station to Auckland Universities via Northern Busway	2,775,498
4	INN	Newmarket, Ponsonby, Karangahape Road, Waitematā Station, Parnell, Newmarket	1,801,846
5	75	Glen Innes to Wynyard Quarter via Remuera Road	1,767,167
6	30	Onehunga to City Centre via Manukau Road	1,592,373
7	18	New Lynn to City Centre (Lower Albert Street) via Great North Road	1,515,100
8	OUT	St Lukes to Newmarket via Wellesley Street and Ponsonby	1,248,837
9	25B	Blockhouse Bay to City Centre via Dominion Road and Mt Eden	1,248,599
10	25L	Lynfield to City Centre via Dominion Road and Mt Eden	1,190,673
11	WX1	Westgate to City Centre (Lower Albert Street) via Northwest Busway	1,156,305
12	83	Massey University to Takapuna via Browns Bay	1,120,586
13	27W	Waikowhai to Waitematā Station via Richardson Rd, Three Kings & Mt Eden Road	1,072,907
14	CTY	Wynyard Quarter to Karangahape Road via Queen Street	1,046,085
15	33	Papakura Station to Otahuhu Station via Great South Road	1,033,759
16	27H	Waikowhai to Waitematā Station via Hillsborough Road, Three Kings, & Mt Eden Road	947,894
17	24B	New Lynn to City Centre via Blockhouse Bay & Sandringham Road	902,830
18	66	Pt Chevalier Beach to Sylvia Park via Mt Albert Road and Royal Oak	881,934
19	12	Henderson to Constellation Station via Westgate	863,801
20	65	Pt Chevalier to Glen Innes via Balmoral Road and Greenlane	811,187

=== Non-AT services ===
There are two bus services running within Auckland that fall under the definition of "exempt" services in the Land Transport Management Act. Exempt services are commercially-run public transport services that do not receive funding or subsidies from government organisations such as AT.

Mahu City Express has run a commuter bus from Snells Beach to Parnell since October 2015. It runs twice a day, Monday to Friday, taking about an hour for the 57 km (35 mi) from Warkworth to Victoria Park, with stops at Smales Farm Station and Akoranga Station. Since 1 March 2021 the first electric luxury coach in the country has been on the route. It uses a 40-seat Yutong TCe12, bought with the aid of a $352,500 EECA grant.

The SkyDrive bus provides a direct bus connection between Auckland Airport and Auckland CBD.

Both services are classified as "non-integral" exempt services, meaning that AT would not otherwise fund a service to fulfill their function if they were not being run commercially (unlike the Waiheke Ferry which is an integral exempt service).

Additionally, Busit on behalf of Waikato Regional Council operate two bus services, 21 (Northern Connector) and 44 (Pōkeno to Pukekohe), that serve the Franklin region of Auckland and the northern Waikato area.

=== Bus rapid transit ===
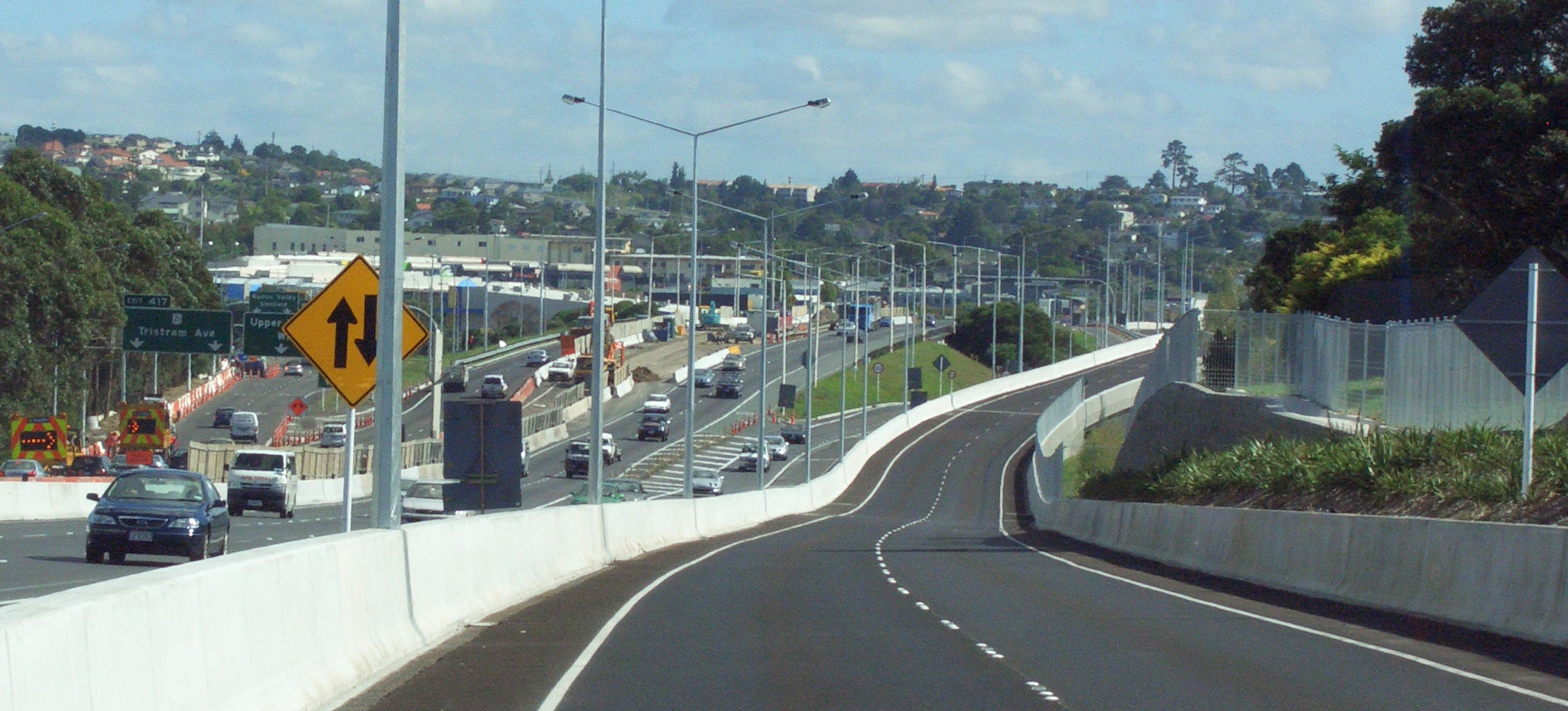
Northern Busway looking north along the Tristram Avenue viaduct

As of 2026, Auckland has two busways.

The Northern Busway is a segregated bus rapid transit route that runs along the eastern side of the Auckland Northern Motorway, part of State Highway 1, in the north of Auckland, New Zealand, linking the North Shore with the northern end of the Auckland Harbour Bridge. As of May 2022, the busway consists of two-way lanes running between Albany Station and Akoranga Station, and from Akoranga Station a southbound-only lane that joins the Harbour Bridge approaches just south of the Onewa Road on-ramp system. The busway previously ended at Constellation before an extension to Albany was constructed in 2022.

Six stations provide access points for passengers to board; some stations have park and ride parking spaces; others have drop off and pick up zones only.

City-bound Northern Express (NX1 and NX2) services commence from Hibiscus Coast Station or Albany Station; from Albany, the lanes reduced travel time to Waitematā station from around one hour by car during peak hours to about half an hour by bus. In the reverse direction, NX1 and NX2 services leaving the city travel north to the Akoranga off-ramp, cross over the motorway, and enter Akoranga Station, from where they travel north on the busway lanes. The busway lanes are also an important transport link within the North Shore, where they are the spine of the bus-based public transport system.

The Eastern Busway, also known as AMETI (the Auckland Manukau Eastern Transport Initiative), is an urban busway under construction in the southeastern suburbs of Panmure, Pakuranga and Botany, in Auckland, New Zealand. The first section of the busway, between Panmure and Pakuranga, opened in December 2021. The entire project is expected to be complete by 2027.

Other planned busways include the Northwest Busway between Westgate and the city centre, and a bus connection between Auckland Airport and Botany. There are currently some sections of bus lanes on SH16 between Westgate and Newton Road as an interim "short-term" improvement before the Northwestern Busway is built. In 2026 a proper bus station open at Westgate, called Te Waiarohia.

Auckland also has bus lanes, some of which operate at peak times only and others 24 hours a day. These lanes are for buses and two-wheeled vehicles only and are intended to reduce congestion and shorten travel times. All are sign-posted and marked on the road surface.

=== Long-distance services ===
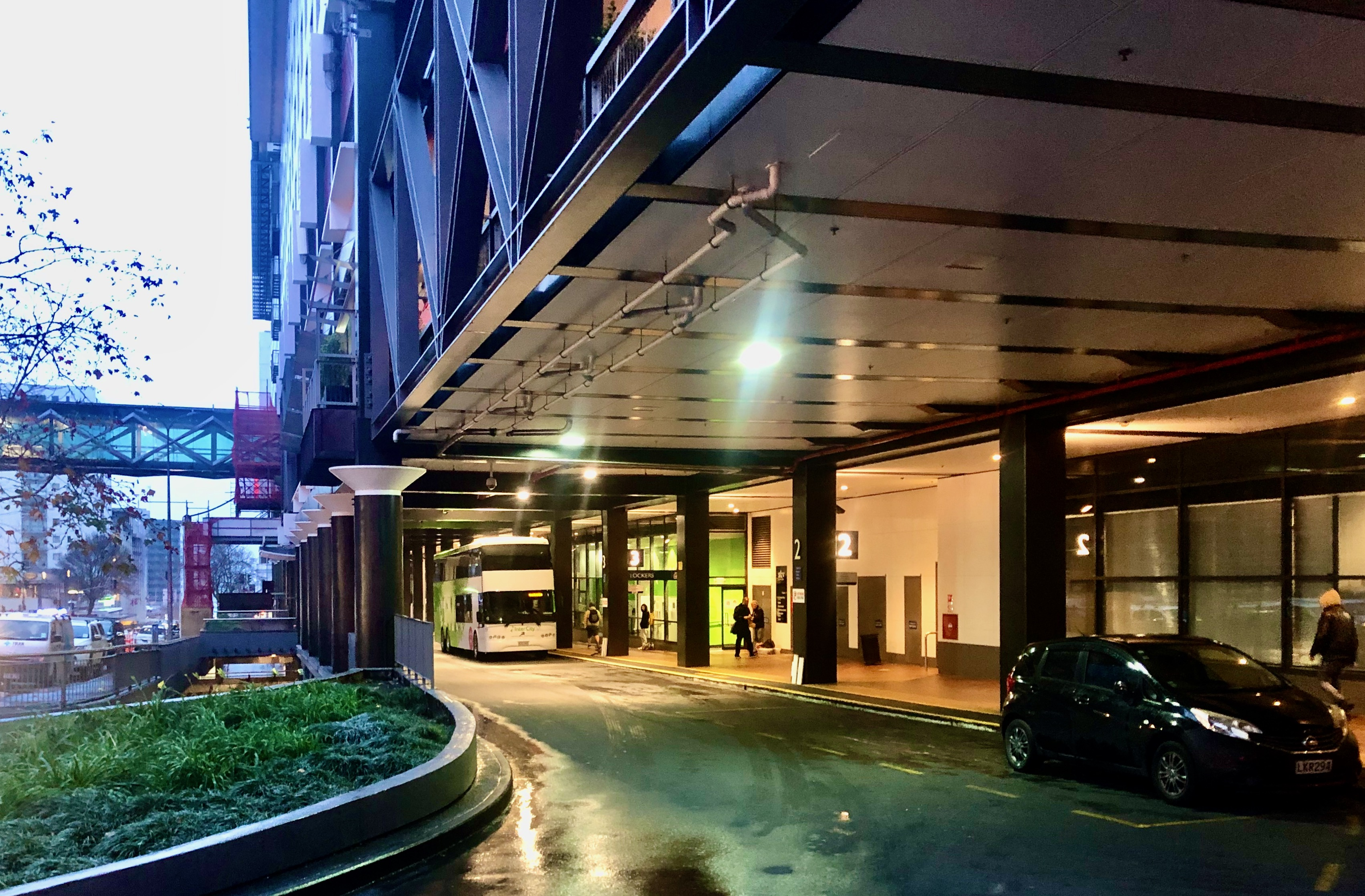
InterCity Volvo B11R (ex. ManaBus) at SkyCity in 2021, going to Tauranga

Long-distance bus operator InterCity links Auckland with all the main centres in the North Island. Between November 2018 and 25 March 2020 it also ran the budget-orientated SKIP Bus services. Until 18 August 1996 InterCity services operated from Auckland railway station. Since then they have run from SkyCity. SkyCity wants the bus station to move and it has been criticised for diesel fumes and poor toilets. However, InterCity rejected a move to Manukau and, in 2020, plans to move back to the old railway station were dropped. Most intercity services do stop at Manukau.

== Trains ==
Auckland's current rail network (2026 onwards)

=== Urban services ===
Auckland's train services comprise three lines and, with the anticipated removal of railway level crossings, are being developed into the city's most extensive form of high frequency, grade-separated public transit. These lines function primarily as a suburbs-to-city-centre commuter rail network, combined with a short stretch of city-centre underground rail. The suburban train system is branded as Auckland rapid transport, commonly abbreviated to ART. Apart from three underground stations in the central city section (Waitematā, Te Waihorotiu and Karanga-a-Hape), all tracks and stations on the city's rail network are above ground or in open-air trenches.

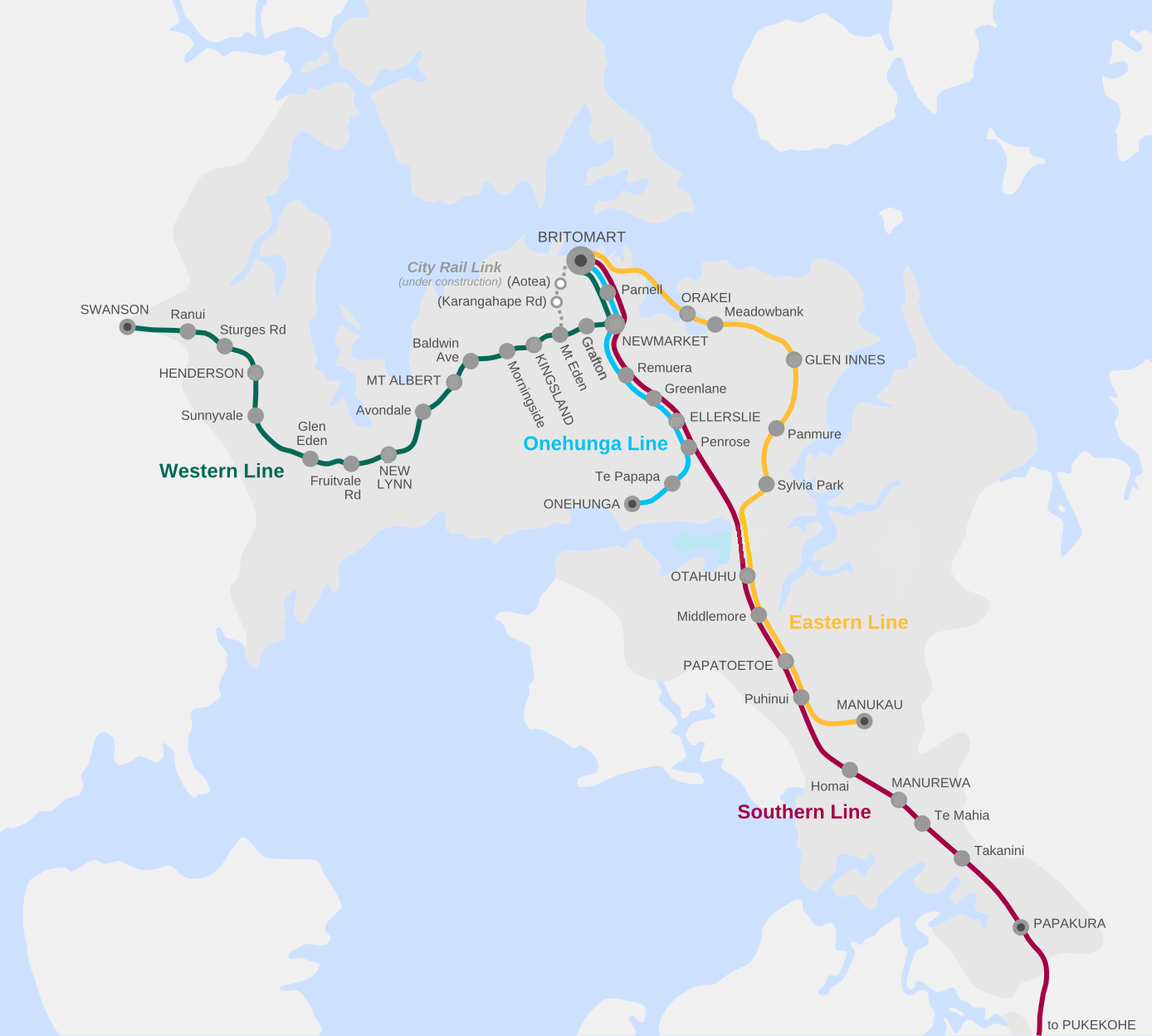
Auckland's rail network prior to the 2026 opening of the City Rail Link tunnel

High-frequency grade-separated services have been possible on the rail network since the opening in 2026 of the twin tunnel under Auckland's central business district. These metro-like tunnels were known during their decade-long construction as the City Rail Link. Previously, a dead-end in the network constrained frequencies, capacities, and speeds, with certain trains having to reverse out of a long cul-de-sac before new trains could enter the network's main terminus at the waterfront. The City Rail Link fixed this problem by means of a tunnelling-connection solution. The new tunnels allowed faster and more numerous city-bound, crosstown, and loop journeys with no transfers, and consolidated the network into three lines. They also allowed the construction of two new stations in the Central Business District, Te Waihorotiu and Karanga-a-Hape, both previously unserviced by trains despite their economic and cultural importance.

In the near term, train frequencies are expected to increase to as many as eight trains per hour during peak hours (one train every seven or eight minutes on average) on certain lines. However, full metro-like frequencies, capacities, and speeds on par with international counterparts will not be possible until grade separation is completed in suburban stretches of the network; removal of all level crossings is expected to require decades of additional work.

Operations are contracted out to a private operator, Auckland One Rail. Trains and stations are owned by Auckland Transport, while track and other rail infrastructure is owned by KiwiRail.

The three lines operational since 2026 are the South City (S-C, coded red), East West (E-W, coded green), and Onehunga West (O-W, coded blue) lines. (Prior to the opening of the City Rail Link tunnel, the network consisted of four lines: the Southern, Eastern, Western and Onehunga Lines.

Line	Frequency		Calling at	Notes
Line	Peak	Off-peak	Calling at	Notes
East West line	6-8tph	4tph	Swanson, Rānui, Sturges Road, Henderson, Sunnyvale, Glen Eden, Fruitvale Road, New Lynn, Avondale, Mount Albert, Baldwin Avenue, Morningside, Kingsland, Maungawhau, Karanga-a-Hape, Te Waihorotiu, Waitematā, Ōrākei, Meadowbank, Glen Innes, Panmure, Sylvia Park, Ōtāhuhu, Middlemore, Papatoetoe, Puhinui, Manukau	Some peak hour trains operate between Kingsland and Sylvia Park.
South City line	6tph	4tph	Newmarket, Parnell, Waitematā, Te Waihorotiu, Karanga-a-Hape, Grafton, Newmarket, Remuera, Greenlane, Ellerslie, Penrose, Ōtāhuhu, Middlemore, Papatoetoe, Puhinui, Homai, Manurewa, Te Mahia, Takaanini, Papakura, Drury, Paerātā, Pukekohe	Some late morning and evening trains depart and terminate at Manukau.
Onehunga West line	2tph	2tph	Henderson, Sunnyvale, Glen Eden, Fruitvale Road, New Lynn, Avondale, Mount Albert, Baldwin Avenue, Morningside, Kingsland, Maungawhau, Grafton, Newmarket, Remuera, Greenlane, Ellerslie, Penrose, Te Papapa, Onehunga	Onehunga West trains only operate between Henderson and Maungawhau off-peak.
tph = trains per hour

==== Rolling stock ====
Class	Image	Type	Top speed		Number	Carriages	Routes operated	Built
Class	Image	Type	km/h	mph	Number	Carriages	Routes operated	Built
AM class		EMU	110	68	95	3	East West Line; South City Line; Onehunga West Line	2013–2026

==== Improvements ====
Since the opening of Britomart Station, now named Waitematā, in 2003, significant improvements have been made to urban rail services.

Project DART upgraded the core rail network between 2006 and 2012, including double-tracking the Western Line (completed in 2010), constructing the Manukau Branch line from Wiri to Manukau City Centre (completed in 2012), rebuilding and reconfiguring Newmarket railway station (completed in 2010), and reopening the disused Onehunga Branch line for passengers in September 2010. Further track infrastructure improvements have taken the form of the construction of a Third Main Line in the south of the city.

Infrastructure and rolling stock improvements allowed for significant increases in the numbers of services. Sunday services were reintroduced in October 2005 for the first time in over 40 years, together with a general 25% service frequency increase. The Auckland railway electrification allowed for the purchase of a standardised fleet of new electric trains, with an initial purchase of 57 units. The first electric passenger services operated in April 2014. Between 2022 and 2025, the section of line between Papakura and Pukekohe was electrified, allowing for electric services to operate on the last remaining section of the urban network that had not been electrified. A second batch of 15 trains was ordered in 2017 and a third batch of 23 trains was ordered in 2022, increasing the quantity of rolling stock available to run more frequent and higher capacity services.

There have also been several station rebuilds. Ōtāhuhu Station was extensively rebuilt to connect with a new bus interchange. It was reopened in October 2016 to coincide with the launching of a new bus network timetable in South Auckland, Pukekohe and Waiuku. Puhinui Station was also rebuilt as a bus-rail interchange to connect Auckland Airport with Manukau Bus Station. The new interchange opened on 26 July 2021. New stations at Drury and Paerātā were opened in August 2026, while Ngākōroa is due to open in 2027.

These improvements have led to rapid growth in rail ridership, from a low of 1 million annual boardings in 1994 to over 20 million in 2017.

On 13 September 2026 the City Rail Link opened, along with new city centre stations Karanga-a-Hape and Te Waihorotiu. Besides these stations and shorter trips from western Auckland to the city centre, the CRL means Waitematā Station is no longer a "dead end", dramatically increasing the capacity of the network.

==== Future Proposals ====
Another major track infrastructure project is the Avondale-Southdown Line, a line between Avondale in west Auckland and the Southdown Freight Terminal, to allow freight trains to avoid Newmarket and reduce delays for both freight and passenger trains. The idea of this rail link has been discussed since the 1950s and KiwiRail owns most of the land in the designated railway corridor where the line is planned. The project was included in the Fast-track Approvals Act 2024. As of April 2025 no funding has been allocated to progress the project.

In mid-2025, residents and TRAC (The Rail Advocacy Collective) held meetings in Auckland's northwestern township of Huapai to petition the incumbent rail operators, Auckland Transport & KiwiRail, to restart talks around running a train service on the North Auckland Line out to Huapai. Previously, a trial service ran between Britomart and Helensville until 2009.

=== Long-distance services ===
While Auckland was historically served by a variety of long-distance passenger train services, including the Kaimai Express and Geyserland Express as recently as 2001, it currently only has two. There have been proposals to reintroduce long-distance services, including a network of higher speed rail services linking Auckland with other locations in the Upper North Island, as well as an overnight sleeper train to Wellington. So far the only proposal to eventuate has been the 2021 reintroduction of a service connecting Auckland to the neighbouring Waikato Region, named Te Huia. While the service expanded the long-distance passenger rail options out of Auckland (which had previously just been served by the Northern Explorer), it is still severely limited by low service frequencies and high travel times.

Service	Termini	Frequency	Intermediate stops	Operator	First service	Annual patronage (2024)
Northern Explorer	Auckland Strand Station, Wellington	Three times weekly (each direction)	Papakura (Auckland), Hamilton Frankton (Waikato), Otorohanga (Waikato), Taumarunui (Manawatū-Whanganui), National Park (Manawatū-Whanganui), Ohakune (Manawatū-Whanganui), Pamerston North (Manawatū-Whanganui), Paraparaumu (Wellington)	KiwiRail (Great Journeys New Zealand)	25 June 2012 (replacing the Overlander)	
Te Huia	Auckland Strand Station, Hamilton Frankton	2tpd (Monday-Wednesday, Saturday) 3tpd (Thursday-Friday) 1tpd (Sunday)	Puhinui (Auckland), Pukekohe (Auckland), Huntly (Waikato), Rotokauri (Waikato)	KiwiRail (on behalf of Waikato Regional Council)	6 April 2021	86,377
tpd = trains per day (each way)

== Ferries ==
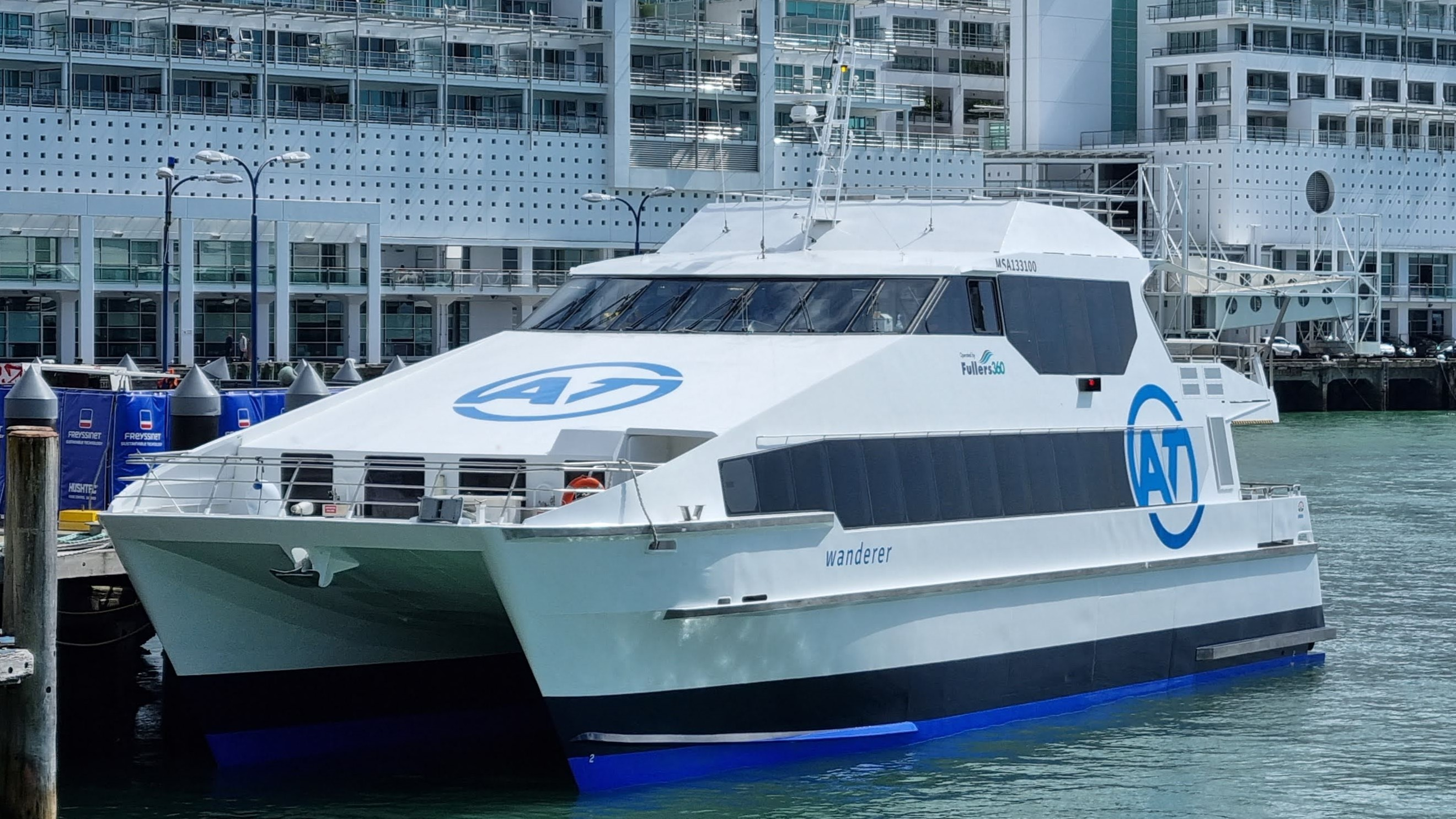
Wanderer, one of four upgraded ferries owned by AT since 2022

=== History ===
The first official ferry started in 1854, the first steam ferry in 1860, the first scheduled ferry in 1865, Auckland & North Shore Steam Ferry Co in 1869, Devonport Steam Ferry Company in 1885, a vehicle ferry in 1911 and North Shore Ferries in 1959.

In 1981 George and Douglas Hudson bought North Shore Ferries and Waiheke Shipping Co. In 1984 they founded Gulf Ferries, and their first catamaran, the $3m Quickcat, cut the Waiheke ferry time from 75 minutes to 40, with Fullers putting Kea on the Devonport route from 1988. Fullers Corporation was mainly operating cruises and, in 1987, when they introduced Supercat III, they were refused a licence to compete on Waiheke commuter trips. The Hudsons bought Fullers from its 1988 receivership and formed Fullers Group in 1994 and Stagecoach took a majority holding in 1998. In 2009, Souter Holdings purchased Fullers Group and also 360 Discovery Cruises.

In 2022, Auckland Transport (AT) purchased four diesel ferries that were in dire need of repair from Fullers, and upgraded them which reduced their emissions.

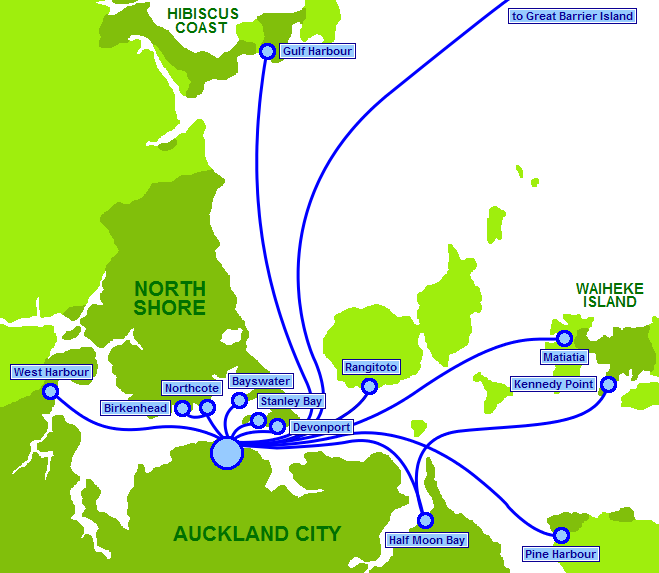
Ferry routes in 2007

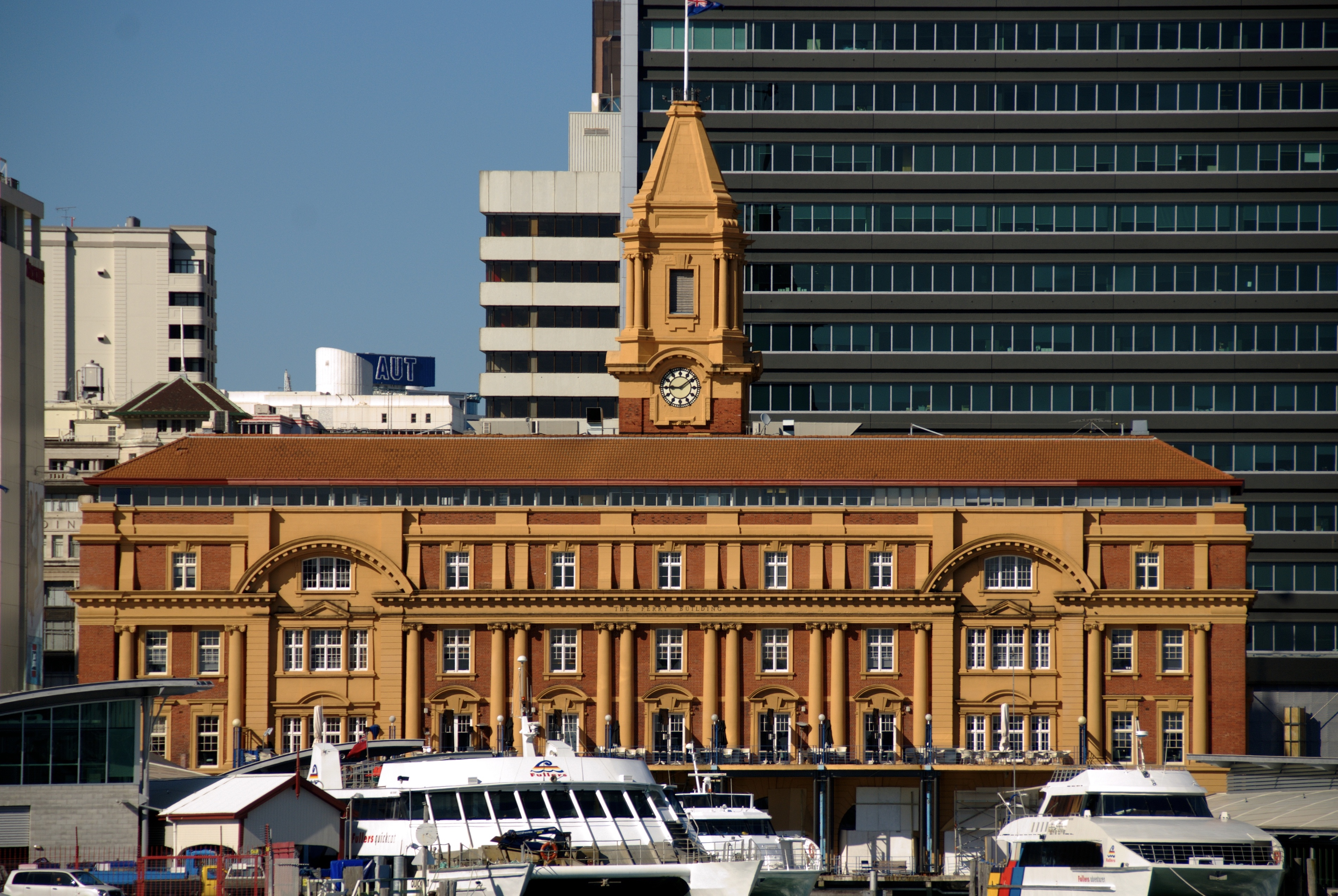
Auckland Ferry Terminal, 2007

=== Services ===
Around 7 million ferry trips per year were made in Auckland in prior to COVID-19. Yearly patronage decreased to 3 million in 2021, due to the ongoing impact of COVID-19 on public transport.

Most ferry routes start from Downtown Auckland and have no intermediate stops. The ferry operators are:

- Fullers360
- SeaLink (Pine Harbour)
- Belaire (West Harbour and Rakino Island)
- Explore (Tiritiri Matangi Island, Bayswater and Birkenhead / Northcote Point)

=== Terminals ===
The Auckland Ferry Terminal is in downtown Auckland on Quay Street, between Princes Wharf and the container port, directly opposite Britomart Station.

- North Shore terminals: Devonport, Bayswater, Northcote Point, Birkenhead, Beach Haven, Gulf Harbour
- East Auckland terminals: Half Moon Bay, Pine Harbour
- Waitematā Harbour's western terminals: West Harbour, Hobsonville

Ferries also connect the city with islands of the Hauraki Gulf. Regular sailings serve Waiheke Island, with less frequent services to Great Barrier Island, Rangitoto Island, Motutapu Island and other inner-gulf islands, primarily for tourism.

There are no ferry services on the west coast of Auckland, although there were some historical services from Onehunga. None are planned, as the city's waterfront orientation is much stronger towards the (eastern) Waitematā Harbour than to the (western) Manukau Harbour.

=== Electric ferries ===
In June 2025, Auckland's first electric commuter ferry was launched and is expected to enter service later in the year. The vessel is the first of two fully electric ferries commissioned by Auckland Transport, with the second ferry currently under construction at Auckland boatbuilder McMullen & Wing. Both vessels will have capacity for 200 passengers and have been built with an approximate cost of $20 million. To support operations of the ferries, electric charging infrastructure is set to be installed at the Downtown, Half Moon Bay, and Hobsonville ferry terminals. In addition to the fully electric ferries, Auckland Transport has commissioned two 300-passenger hybrid-electric ferries, with the first expected to launch later in 2025. There is the potential to obtain a further five electric or hybrid-electric ferries, subject to funding decisions made the New Zealand Government who provided two-thirds of the funding for the initial batch of ferries. While the ferries will be publicly owned by Auckland Transport (a departure from the typical Auckland model of ferries owned by private operators), they will initially be operated by Fullers360.

== On-demand services ==
AT Local was trialed as an on-demand rideshare operated by Auckland Transport in Devonport from late 2018. The service used electric vehicles to transport within Devonport, primarily to-and-from the ferry terminal. Passenger numbers failed to reach the target and local board member Michael Sheey described it as unsuccessful with the service being subsidised at $41.48 per rider. Transport blogger Matt Lowrie said the money spent on the service would be put to better use on public transport or walking and cycling upgrades. The service was cancelled in February 2021.

In October 2021 Auckland Transport relaunched AT Local in the Papakura-Takanini catchment, replacing the under used 371 bus service.

There is ongoing consultation around a plan to move the AT Local to a new bus service, the 364, but so far only a route map has been released. According to the Regional Public Transport Plan (RPTP) released by Auckland Transport in 2023, the Pukekohe bus routes 391, 392, 393 (and possibly 394) were likely to be replaced by AT Local, but there is not much evidence to show the plan is still going ahead.

== Network structure and planning ==
Within Auckland's public transport network, AT has designated certain sections as being part of the Rapid Transit and Frequent Transit Networks. These are used for indicating higher levels of services that Auckland's system is planned around.

The Rapid Transit Network (RTN) consists of the train network along with rapid bus services which run on higher frequencies, have dedicated bus stations, and use bus priority infrastructure such as the Northern and Eastern busways. These services form the spines of Auckland's public transport system and are designed with the intention of efficiently moving large quantities of people between public transport hubs in different parts of Auckland. Planning for this network is set out in the Auckland Rapid Transit Pathway which separates the current and potential future network out into corridors.

Rapid Transit Network
Corridor	Current Services	Current Infrastructure	Future Infrastructure
Existing Heavy Rail Network	East West line, Onehunga West line, South City line	North Island Main Trunk (including City Rail Link), North Auckland Line, Newmarket Line, Onehunga Branch, Manukau Branch	
Northwest	WX1	Te Atatu Bus Interchange, Lincoln Road Bus Interchange, Westgate Bus Station	Northwest Busway (planned)
City Centre to Māngere			City Centre-Mangere Line (proposed)
North Shore	NX1, NX2	Northern Busway	
Eastern Busway		Eastern Busway (first section)	Eastern Busway (under construction)
Airport to Botany	AirportLink	Puhinui Railway Station, Manukau Bus Station	Airport to Botany Busway (proposed)
Upper Harbour			
Crosstown			Avondale-Southdown Line (proposed)

The Rapid Transit Network is supported by the Frequent Transit Network (FTN) that involves a selection of specially-targeted high frequency bus services focusing more on higher public transport patronage, rather than providing widespread coverage that often requires slower less-efficient routes. The FTN consists of the RTN along with "frequent" bus routes that operate a minimum of every 15 minutes between 7am and 7pm on all days of the week and are indicated by either having a two digit number (e.g. route 70, route 30) or by having a name (e.g. CityLink, TāmakiLink, Northern Express). The FTN has grown substantially in the last decade to encompass 43 routes in 2025 serving bus stops within 500 metres of 45% of Auckland's population. Commentators and industry professionals have lauded it as drastically improving Auckland's public transport network and have even gone as far as to claim that, while train services that form the backbone of public transport systems in most cities are still undeveloped, the FTN has created the "best [bus system] in Australasia."

== Ticketing and fares ==
An integrated ticketing / smartcard system, known as the AT HOP card, was developed for Auckland by Thales, similar to systems like the Octopus card in Hong Kong.

The first stage of integrated ticketing came online in time for the Rugby World Cup 2011, with construction works for the 'tag on' / 'tag off' infrastructure having begun in January 2011. The 'HOP Card' was publicised with a $1 million publicity campaign that started in early 2011.

The AT HOP card system went live in October 2012 for trains, November 2012 for ferries and between June 2013 and March 2014 for buses.

In 2016, Auckland Transport simplified fares by changing to a system based on 13 fare zones. The fare is no longer based on the distance travelled (number of stages), but on the number of zones passed through, so that a journey in a zone that involves multiple rides or even a mode mix (bus or train) will be charged only one fare. Ferries are not included in the simplified fares system and are charged per ride.

A national ticketing system (branded as Motu Move) has been proposed by Waka Kotahi which will "improve public transport for New Zealanders through a standardised approach to paying for public transport which will provide a common customer experience no matter where you are in the country." Auckland is set to receive the system by 2026.

In 2023, AT announced bus, train and ferry passengers would be able to 'tag on/off' with contactless payments (debit/credit cards, Apple Pay and Google Pay) in addition to AT HOP cards by June 2024. This was implemented in November 2024.

== Public advocacy ==
A number of groups advocate for improving public transport in Auckland. Some groups operate prominent blogs, participate in public discussions on social media and prepare plans advocating for particular improvements. These groups include:

- Greater Auckland
- Generation Zero
- Campaign for Better Transport
- Public Transport Users Association

== See also ==
- List of Auckland railway stations
- Public transport in New Zealand
- Rail transport in New Zealand
- Transport in Auckland
- Trolleybuses in Auckland
- Light rail in Auckland
