= Greater Auckland (advocacy group) =

New Zealand advocacy group

- Formation: 2008
- Purpose: Urban planning
- Location: Auckland, New Zealand
- Website: https://www.greaterauckland.org.nz/
- Formerly called: Auckland Transport Blog, Transport Blog

Greater Auckland is a non-profit group that advocates for public transport and urbanism in Auckland, New Zealand. The group was originally founded as the Auckland Transport Blog but has since evolved to analysing and publishing on a number of Auckland (and global) issues, like housing and climate change.

== History ==
Transport Blog's first post came on 8 July 2008 written in blog style by urban planner Joshua Arbury, titled "Trains", which discussed the progress made on the Auckland train network.

Arbury later said he was inspired to make comment on transport after seeing several episodes of a YouTube documentary by sustainable transport campaigner Michael Tritt, Auckland, City of Cars, which critiqued Auckland's dependence on cars and low uptake of public transport. Matt Lowrie and Patrick Reynolds later joined the site as regular contributors, and became de facto administrators after Arbury took on the job of principal transport planner at Auckland Council in March 2012.

=== "Congestion Free Network (CFN)" ===
In collaboration with Generation Zero and the Campaign for Better Transport, Transport Blog unveiled maps that it proclaimed as the future of Auckland's public transportation network. The network was publicly presented to the Auckland Council's governing body in 2013. The proposals were adopted by the Green Party and were referred to in the Labour Party's 2014 election platform.

=== From "Transport Blog" to "Greater Auckland" ===
The group was officially incorporated as a society in 2015 as "Greater Auckland", while retaining "Transport Blog" branding online. A fundraiser was then set up in early 2017 to fully rebrand the transport blog into a policy advocacy organisation. The fundraiser successfully raised $20,000. Transport Blog officially switched to Greater Auckland in April 2017.

Later in 2017, Greater Auckland released its "Congestion Free Network 2", an updated version of the organisation's 2013 "CFN" map, which incorporated several changes, notably the introduction of a light rail line to Auckland Airport. The map was editorialised by The Spinoff as "the map that will solve Auckland’s broken transport system". In August 2017, the organisation released maps for regional rail from Auckland to other parts of the North Island.

=== Mainstream prominence ===
The group gained significant prominence in the 2017 general election where its "CFN 2.0" was adopted by the New Zealand Labour Party with significant policy pledges. This came after the party pledged to complete sections of Auckland's light rail network by 2021.

In a 2017 article, the news website Politik described the group as "the website policy wonks winning over the Beehive". According to Politik, "one senior government minister privately described them as “f****** elitists who have captured the Government." In 2018, senior writer for The New Zealand Herald, Simon Wilson, picked Matt Lowrie as the 11th most politically influential Aucklander for his writing on Greater Auckland.

Later in September 2019, site administrator Patrick Reynolds was appointed to the board of the NZ Transport Agency. Reynolds resigned from Greater Auckland to accommodate the move.

== See also ==
- Auckland Transport
- Public transport in New Zealand
