= Campaign for Better Transport (New Zealand) =

The Campaign for Better Transport (CBT) is an Auckland, New Zealand, based advocacy group that promotes alternatives to the private car, including public transport, cycling and walking. It is led by convenor Cameron Pitches.

Most of its campaigns focus on the Auckland region, but some relate to other regions or are nationwide. Current major projects include advocacy for a rail link to the Auckland Airport, which is currently served badly by public transport, including a lack of dedicated bus access from most of Auckland, and advocating for more cost-effective alternatives to the proposed Puhoi-Wellsford motorway—where CBT suggests that spending a much smaller sum on the existing motorway would achieve most of the benefits of the new motorway, while also reducing yearly traffic fatalities on the road much earlier than the much longer-term full new motorway.

One of their recent successes was their key participation in the successful reopening of the Onehunga Branch for passenger rail traffic, for which they campaigned over several years, including collecting 8,000 signatures for a reopening petition in 2006. They also campaigned successfully for a (so far heritage-only) tram circuit to be included in the Wynyard Quarter redevelopment project.

== See also ==
- Transport in Auckland
- Public transport in Auckland
- Public transport in New Zealand
- Greater Auckland (advocacy group)
