= Avondale–Southdown Line =

Proposed railway line in Auckland, New Zealand

Overview
- Status: Proposed, subject to study
- Owner: New Zealand Railways Corporation (land)
- Termini: Southdown or Onehunga Branch; Western line

Service
- Type: Urban rail
- Rolling stock: None

Technical
- Character: Urban
- Track gauge: 3 ft 6 in (1,067 mm)

Map

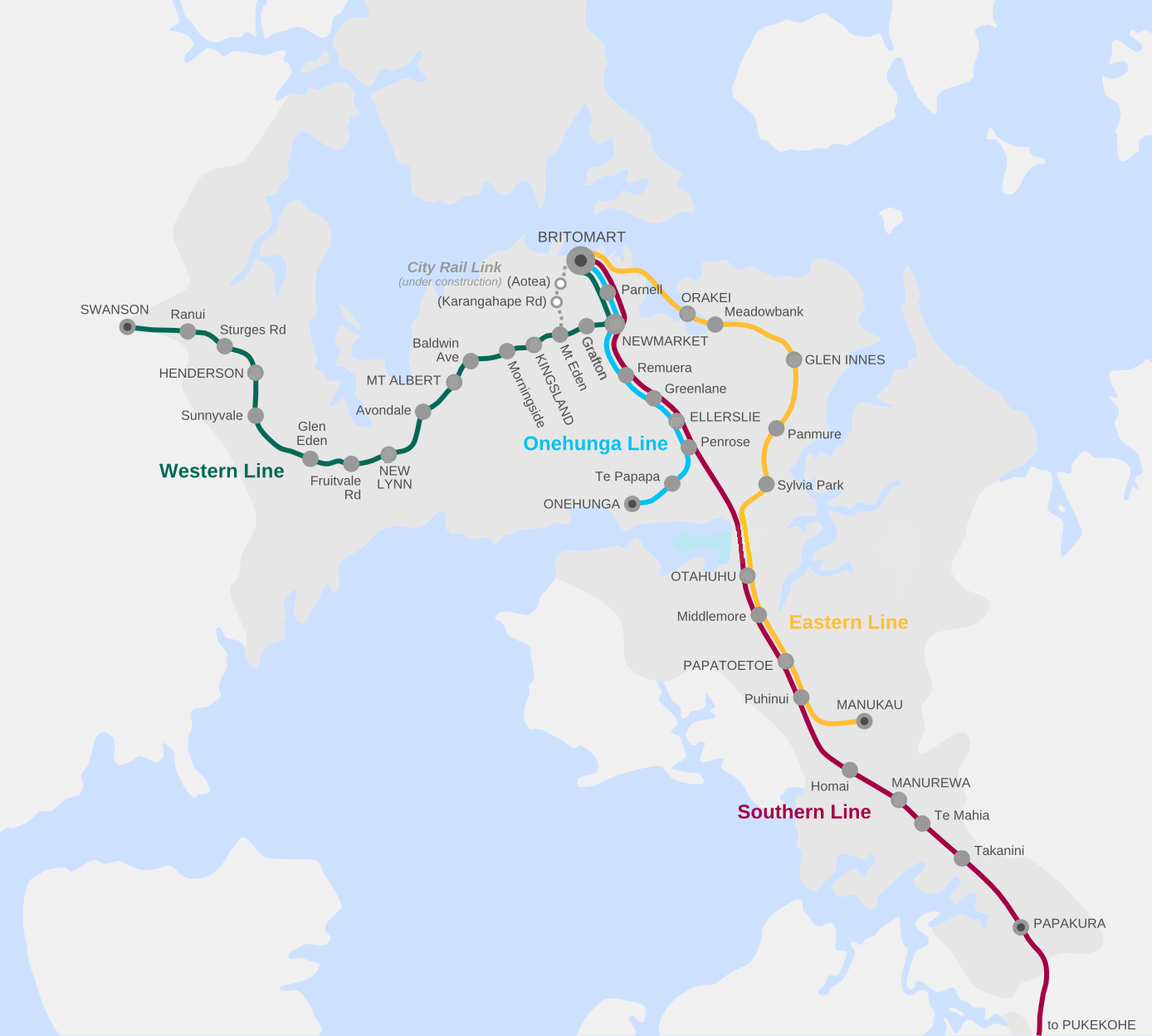
The Auckland passenger rail network as of 23 October 2019. The rail freight terminal at Southdown is located to the east of Te Papapa station. It is the terminus of the Southdown Branch (freight only) which diverges off the Southern Line.

The Avondale–Southdown Line is a proposed railway line between Avondale and Southdown in Auckland, New Zealand. Its main functions would be to remove north–south freight trains from parts of the Auckland rail system which have significant passenger traffic.

== Route ==
The line would connect the Western Line to the east of Avondale Train Station with the Southern Line at Auckland Freight Centre, Southdown. The route has been designated for rail since 1955. The reopening in 2010 of the Onehunga Branch to passenger traffic may make it more feasible for the line to connect with that branch in Onehunga township. New Zealand Railways Corporation owns most of the corridor for the line, which follows Oakley Creek and part of the State Highway 20 corridor. The SH20 extension from Hillsborough to Mount Roskill made provision for the line's construction. The line would cross over the entrance to the SH20 Waterview Connection. KiwiRail has reached an agreement with the NZ Transport Agency over a land swap needed for a realignment of the highway and railway corridors.

Another proposal exists to connect the Onehunga Branch at Galway Street to the Avondale—Southdown line by building a tunnel under Onehunga Mall to meet Hugh Watt Drive (State Highway 20) before connecting to the proposed route at Hillsborough.

== Proposals ==
The corridor was first proposed in the 1940s however freight volumes were never high enough to require its development.

The Auckland Regional Transport Authority's Rail Development Plan 2006 included the line in its long-term vision for Auckland's rail network, however, there has been little development work on the project.

In May 2007, the Auckland Regional Transport Authority (ARTA) announced that it had formed a study group with ONTRACK to investigate the feasibility and costs for the section between Captain Springs Road in Southdown and Hillsborough Road in Mount Roskill.

In 2011, it was envisaged that the line could be built between 2031 and 2040.

Public transport advocates have made alternate proposals for tunnelling or finding alternative corridors for a rail freight bypass, whilst using the line for passenger light rail.

In 2023, the proposed line was revived by the Government for potential use by a new combined light rail and heavy rail corridor. Parts of the elevated quad-track proposal were controversial for residents in Onehunga. Auckland Light Rail has not proceeded with a combined corridor proposal.

KiwiRail later proposed building the heavy rail line for freight and passenger rail, which was now costed at about $6 billion. The new line could be partially trenched or tunnelled through Onehunga. The project is part of the draft 30 year Auckland Rail Programme Business case.

== See also ==
- Public transport in Auckland
- List of New Zealand railway lines
