= Swanson railway station =

Train station in Auckland, New Zealand

Coordinates: 36°52.0′S 174°34.6′E

Swanson
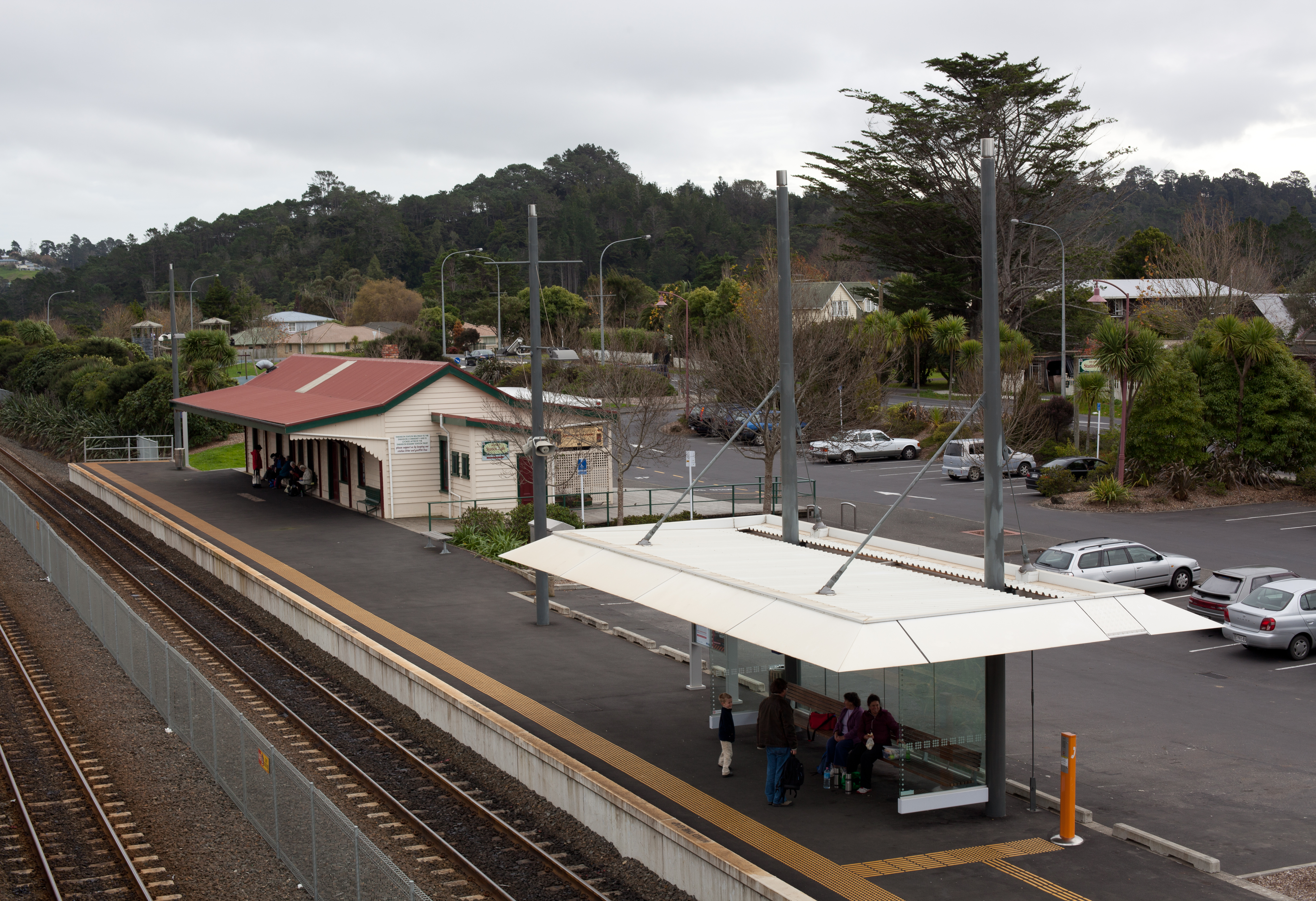
- Photo of the Swanson Railway Station in 2010, showing the historic station building moved from Avondale

General information
- Location: Swanson Road, Swanson, Auckland
- System: Auckland Transport urban rail
- Owner: KiwiRail (track and platforms); Auckland Transport (buildings)
- Operator: Auckland One Rail
- Line: Western Line
- Platforms: Side platforms (P1 & P2)
- Tracks: Mainline (2)

Construction
- Platform levels: 1
- Parking: Yes
- Cycle facilities: Yes
- Accessible: Yes (Lifts)

Other information
- Station code: SWN
- Fare zone: Waitākere

History
- Opened: 18 July 1881
- Rebuilt: 2008
- Electrified: 20 July 2015

Passengers
- 2009: 461 passengers/day

Services
Preceding station	Auckland Transport (Auckland One Rail)	Following station
Terminus	East West Line	Rānui towards Manukau
Location

Swanson railway station is a station on the North Auckland Line in Auckland, New Zealand.

East West line services of the Auckland rail network are operated between the station and Manukau by Auckland One Rail, on behalf of Auckland Transport.

The station is the westernmost and northernmost point of the city's electrified network. It became the terminus of the Western Line in July 2015, when urban train services to Waitakere station ceased because the Waitakere-Swanson section of track was not electrified. A bus shuttle service operates between Waitakere and Swanson stations.

The current station building was relocated from Avondale railway station following an upgrade there.

== History ==
- 1881: The station opened on 18 July.
- 1920: A signal box was built.
- 1925: Signal box destroyed by fire following a lightning strike.
- 1970: Signal box was removed.
- 1972: Closed to goods.
- 1972: Buildings replaced by a platform shelter (on opposite side to present station).
- 1995: Avondale railway station building was relocated here, now Swanson Station Cafe. The Avondale station had been planned for demolition due to its poor state, however after hearing this, Waitakere Community Board members Dave Harré and Penny Hulse lobbied New Zealand Rail to save and refurbish the building.
- 2000: New platform on the east side of the tracks.
- 2008: New platform on the west side of the tracks; the east side platform will be re-established to provide platforms on each side of the new double track.
- 2011: Electrification works started.
- 2014: Electrification works completed, and station energised.
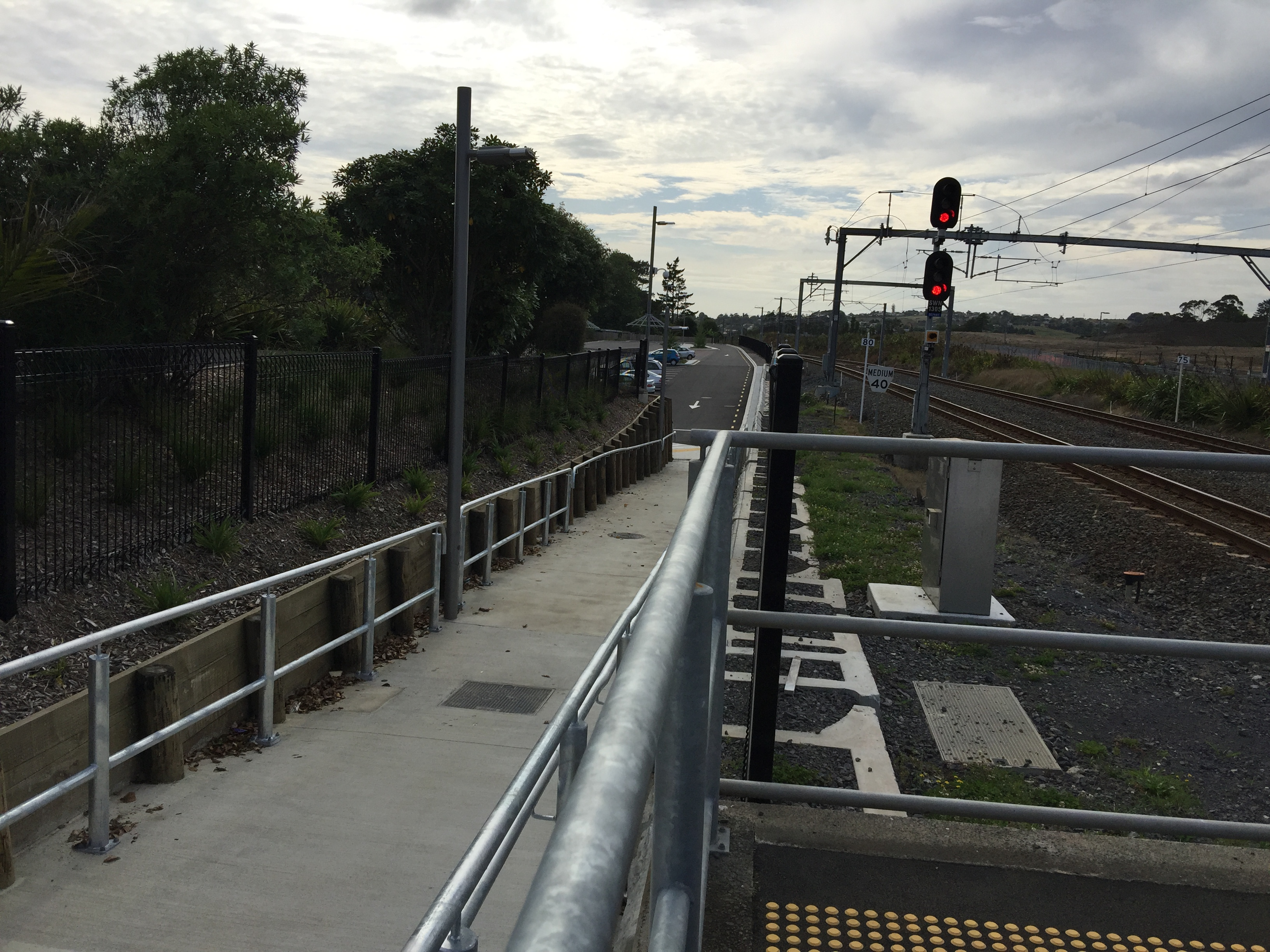
Footpath leading to a carpark. Photo faces east and is taken from platform 1.

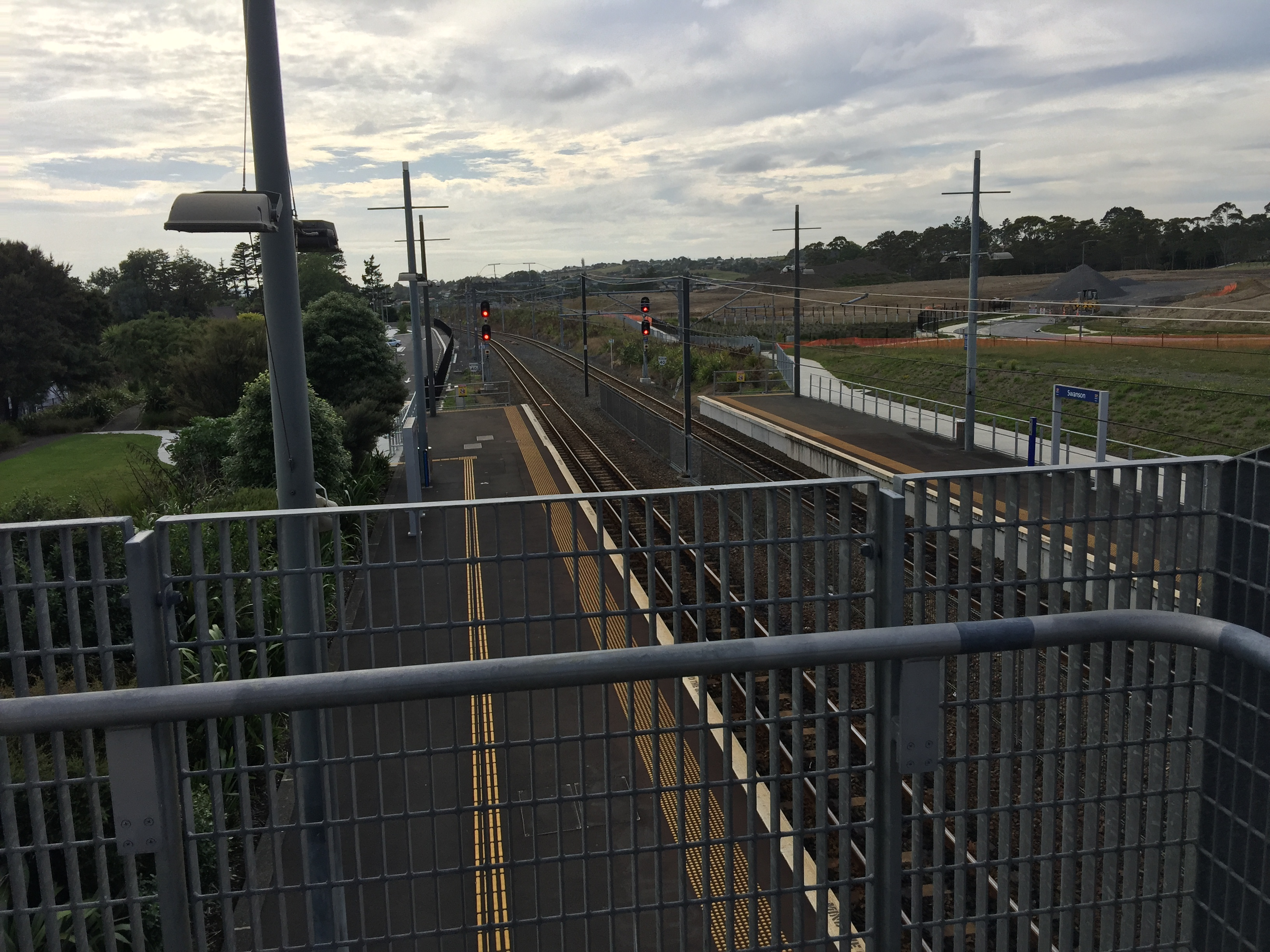
The platforms as well as tracks leading into the station. Photo faces east.

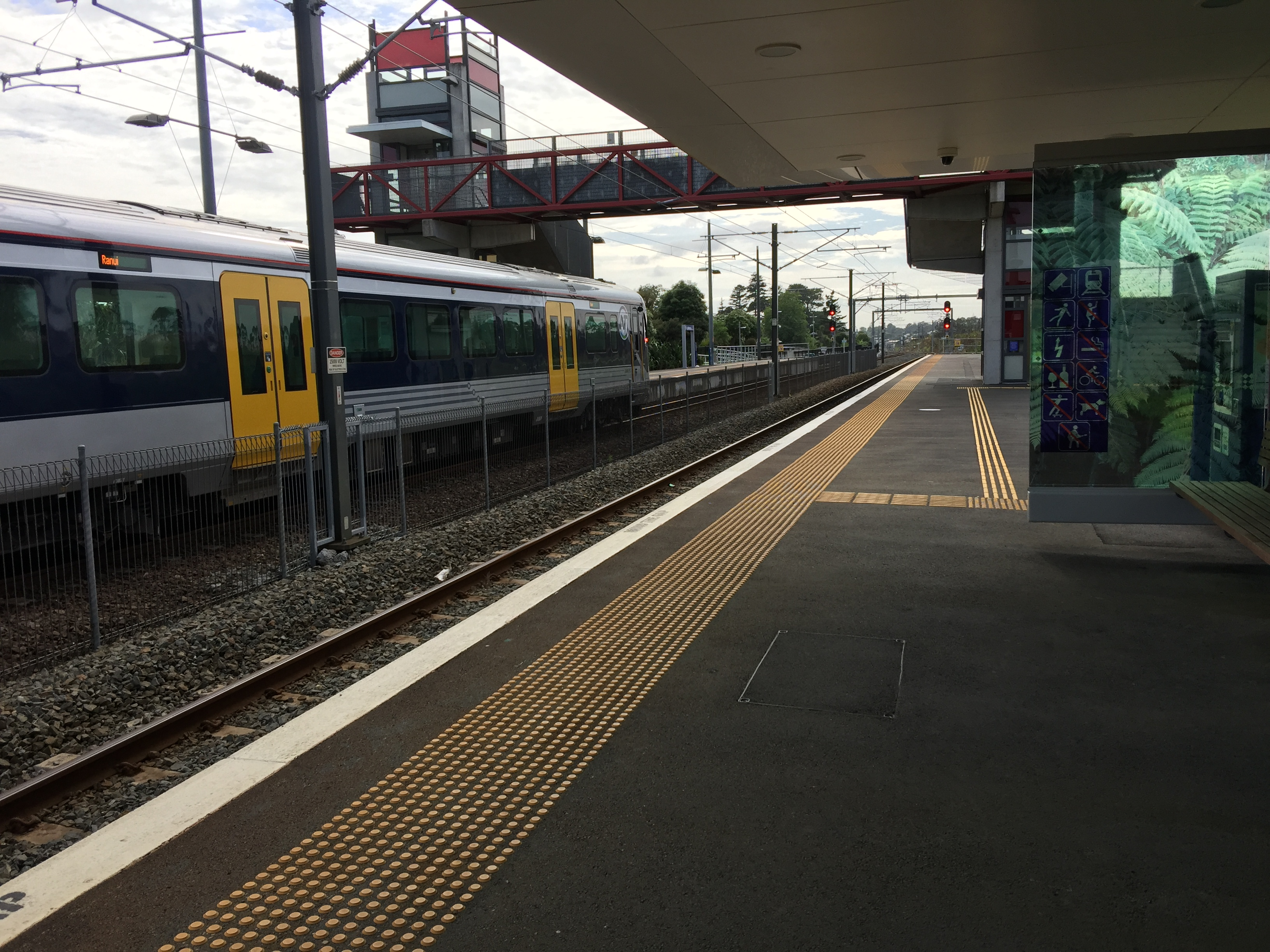
Platform 2 facing east with an EMU in platform 1

== Services ==
East West line suburban train services to Manukau via City Centre are provided by Auckland One Rail on behalf of Auckland Transport.

== See also ==
- List of Auckland railway stations
