= Trams in New Zealand =

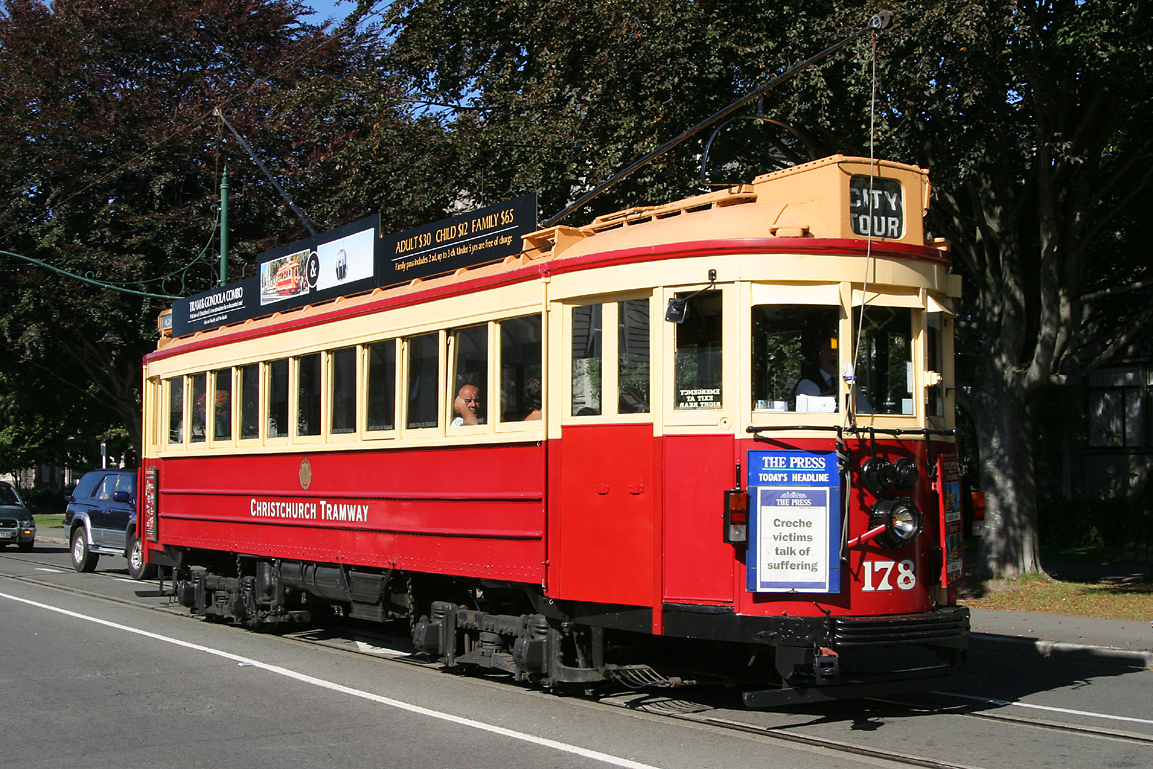
Vintage Christchurch Boon-built Tram No 178 on the Christchurch Tramway

Trams in New Zealand were a major form of transport from the 19th century into the mid-20th century. New Zealand's first (horse) tramway was established in 1862 (Nelson), followed by a steam tramway in 1871 (Thames), and the first electric tramway in 1900 (Maori Hill, Dunedin). In New Zealand railway terminology a bush tramway is an industrial tramway, which usually did not carry passengers.

The tram systems in the main centres, and in some smaller towns, were soon electrified. By the 1950s, all systems were in the process of being replaced by trolley-buses or buses. The last tram service closed in 1964, in Wellington. A tram running parallel with a public road opened in Western Springs, Auckland, in 1980 and a central city loop line in Christchurch in 1995. Both are heritage lines.

In modern parlance, trams are known as "light rail vehicles", and modern tram proposals are referred to as light rail – such as the proposed light rail lines in Auckland.

== History ==
In 1862, the first horse tramway in New Zealand, between Nelson and the port, opened as part of the Dun Mountain Railway, built to export ore from the mine in the hills above Nelson. The legislation enabling the Dun Mountain Railways required a passenger service to be provided, which commenced from 7 May 1862 using a horse-drawn carriage, known as the "City Bus." The service closed in 1901 after a proposal to electrify it was defeated. Other horse-drawn tramway systems were built on the West Coast of the South Island, where a gold rush started in 1864. Horse-drawn tramways could be found in Westport, Charleston, New Brighton, Greymouth, Paroa, Marsden, Kumara, Arahura, Hokitika, Kaniere and Ross.

At Grahamstown (now Thames) in the North Island where gold had also been found, a steam tramway to Tararu was opened on 2 December 1871, but closed on 11 November 1874, due to there being "not sufficient traffic". A steam locomotive for the tramway was built at Mechanics Bay in 1872 by Fraser and Tinne. A steam-tram commenced service in Wellington in August 1878, claiming to be the first "steam-hauled street tramway in the Southern Hemisphere."

Horse-drawn tram lines also opened in the main centres; Auckland and Devonport in 1886, Dunedin in 1879 and Christchurch in 1880. The first electric tram ran to Maori Hill, Dunedin in 1900, and the tramway systems in the main centres were all electrified in the 1900s. Dunedin also had several Cable Car lines to various suburbs and Wellington still has the Wellington Cable Car (actually a funicular) to Kelburn.

Other areas considered building tram systems, but failed to get them approved. For example, a proposal for a 1 3/4 mi (2.8 km) steam tram from Hamilton Town Hall to Frankton railway station was rejected in a 1906 poll of ratepayers by 136 to 58 votes. Similarly, in 1910 Lower Hutt and Petone ratepayers rejected a loan for a battery tramway by 886 to 737 votes. Palmerston North voted 722 to 455 for 5 1/2 mi (8.9 km) of electric trams in 1912, but by 1914 the council had still not advanced the plan.

Most 20th-century systems were electric with overhead wires, apart from the Takapuna (Auckland) steam tramway (1910–1927) and Gisborne, which had two battery-electric trams (1913–1929). The only system to be closed down during this period was Napier, in 1931 after the Napier earthquake. Several long suburban tramway lines were replaced by buses, e.g. Christchurch City to Richmond, Burwood and North Beach in 1934, and to Linwood in 1936.

During the 1950s and early 1960s, all the tramway systems were replaced by buses or trolley-buses: Wanganui (1950), Invercargill (1952), Christchurch and New Plymouth (1954), Auckland and Dunedin (1956) and Wellington (1964). This followed a general international trend, especially in North American and British towns and cities. The traditional tramway systems of the period were as perceived as a slow and outdated means of transport, characterized by inflexible routes and expensive infrastructure maintenance. In Wellington, there was significant opposition to the closure of the last tramway system in New Zealand, and the final decision to disestablish the remaining lines followed on a public referendum in 1959.

All trolley-bus systems in New Zealand have now been closed down: Christchurch (1956), New Plymouth (1967), Auckland (1980), Dunedin (1982) and Wellington (2017).

== By city ==
=== Auckland ===
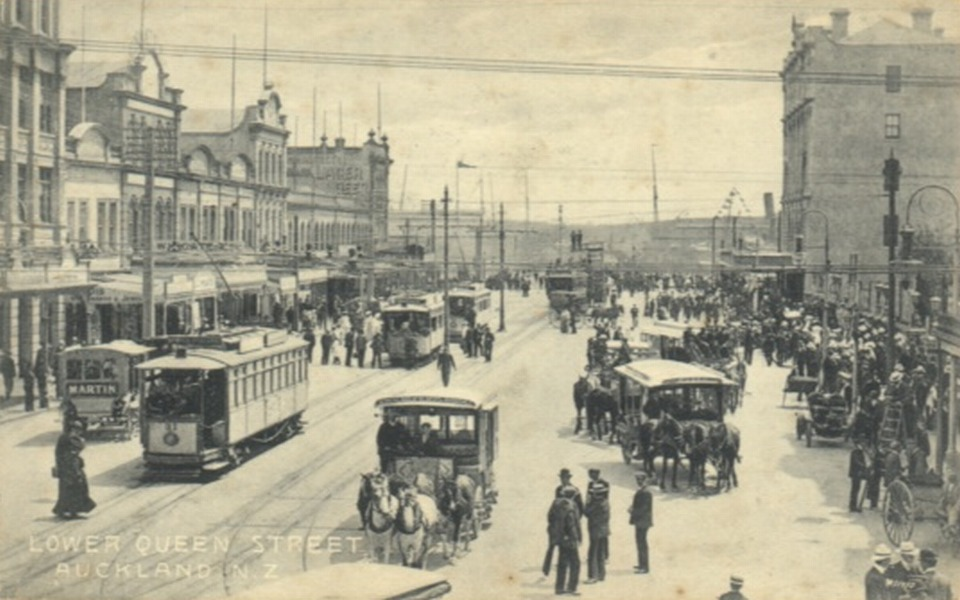
Auckland Trams, Lower Queen Street, 1919

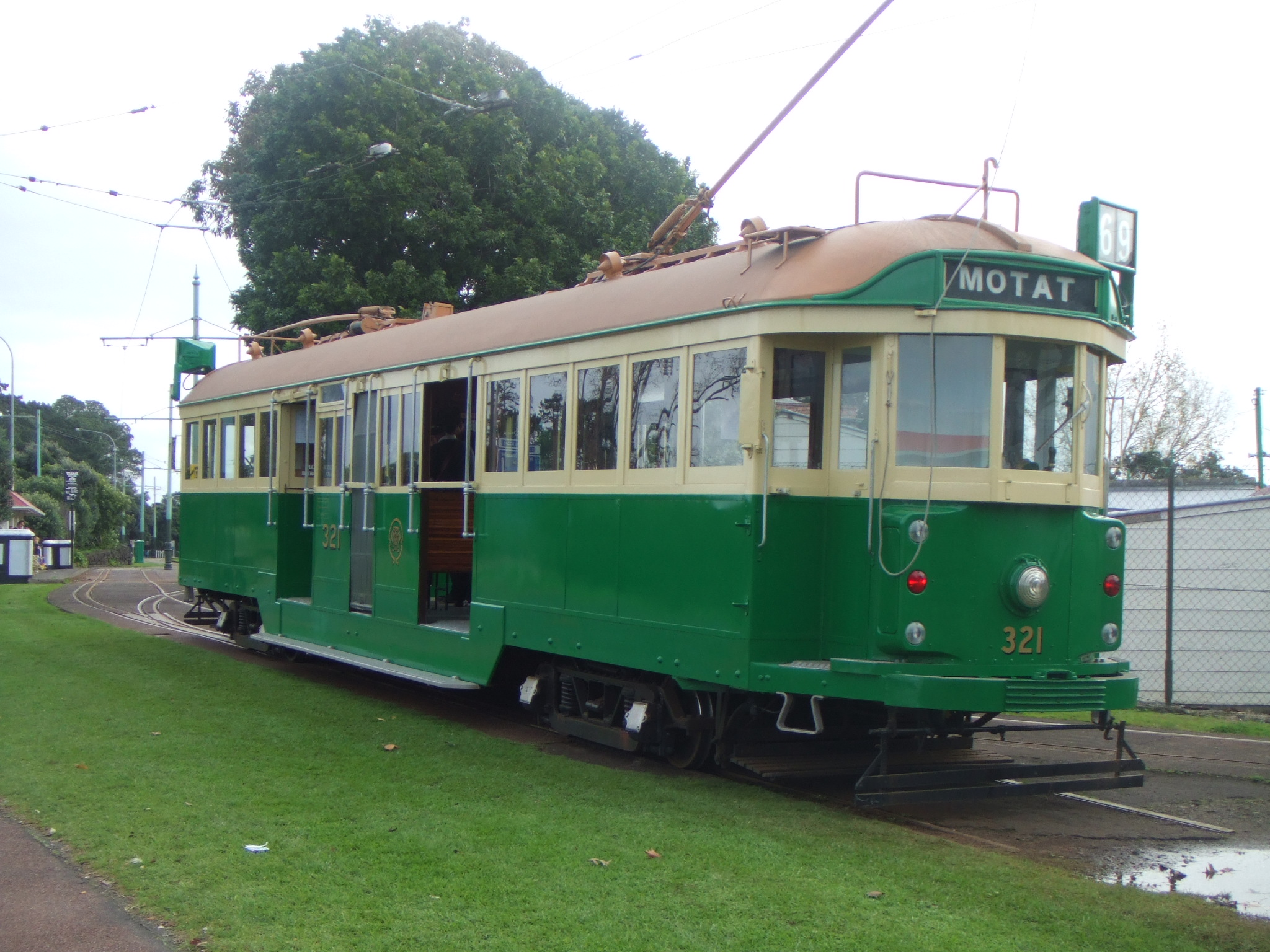
A Museum of Transport and Technology to Auckland Zoo tram in 2006 – a W-class Melbourne tram

==== Auckland City ====
Auckland City had a private company operating horse-drawn trams from 1884. The British Electric Traction Company purchased the Horse Tramway in the late 1890s. With the blessing of the various borough councils that presided over the Auckland isthmus, The Auckland Electric Tramway Company Limited built the initial tram systems in two years and the official opening was held on 17 November 1902, but public service was delayed a week because three of the motormen, from Sydney, Australia, had been drowned in the SS Elingamite shipwreck near Three Kings Islands on 9 November 1902. Public service commenced on 23 November 1902 and was expanded until the mid 1930s and continued to 29 December 1956. Initially the trams were geared for a maximum speed of 18 mph (29 km/h), so took an average of 40 minutes for the longest route, the 7.5 mi (12.1 km) between Queen St and Onehunga.

With services running from downtown at the Waitematā Harbour, across to Onehunga on the Manukau Harbour, Auckland had the world's only 'coast to coast' tramway system. The Auckland Electric Tramway Company started as a private company before being acquired by Auckland City Council. The resulting council owned entity was required to run services outside the borders of Auckland City. By 1938, there were 44 mi (71 km) of tramways in Auckland, with termini at -

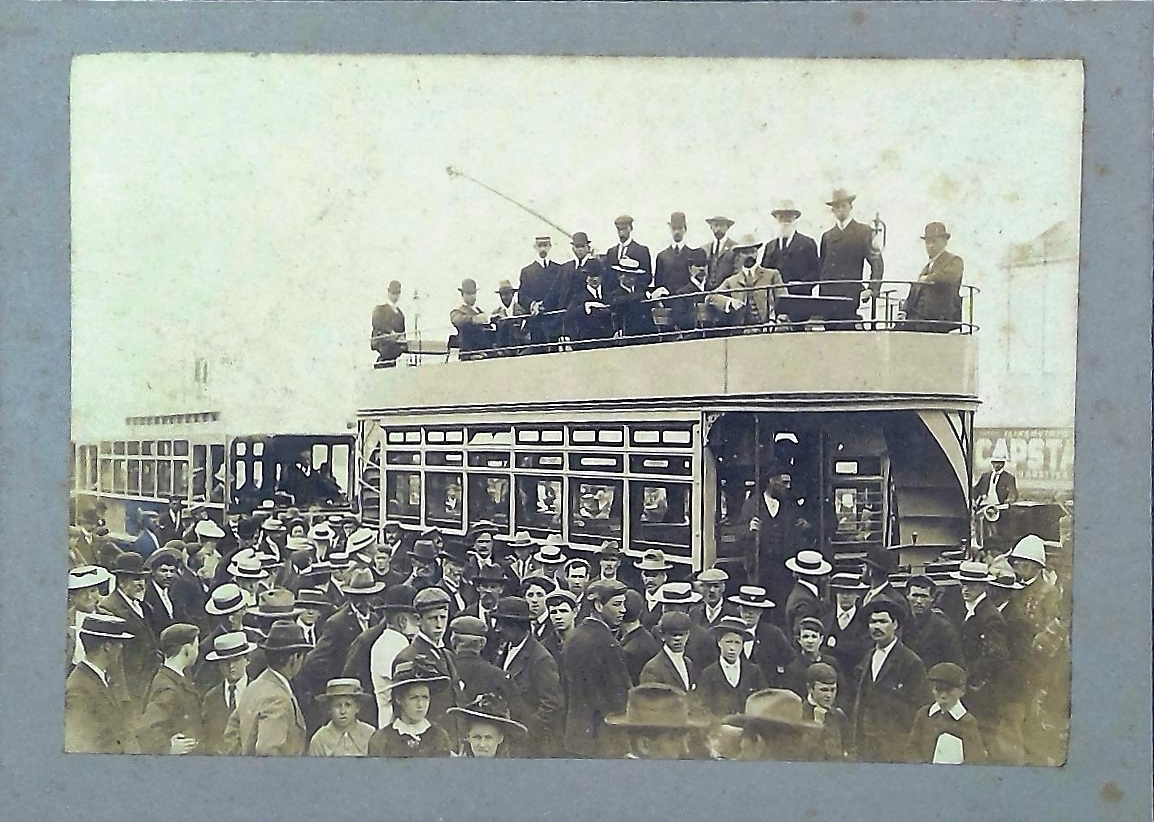
Auckland Electric Tramways – opening of the Newton-Ponsonby section on 24 November 1902

Terminus	Start	Close
Point Chevalier	27 July 1930	20 November 1953
Westmere	10 May 1931	13 March 1953
Zoo	17 December 1923	13 March 1953
Carlaw Park	5 October 1929	22 December 1956
Herne Bay	27 October 1903	23 September 1949
Meadowbank	8 June 1930	17 August 1956
Ellerslie Racecourse	29 October 1923	2 January 1955
Green Lane Hospital	23 April 1939	28 December 1956
Onehunga Wharf	28 September 1903	29 December 1956
Three Kings	28 March 1931	22 May 1953
Mount Roskill	2 February 1930	11 September 1953
Owairaka	21 February 1931	6 August 1954
Avondale	31 January 1932	13 January 1956
Farmers Free Tram, Beresford Street to Wyndham St. Farmers Trading Company siding and entrance	6 May 1936	20 November 1953

From 1949 a modernisation programme saw the electric tramway routes being replaced by trolleybuses, commencing with the Herne Bay route and with trolleybuses eventually replicating the entire network by December 1956 when the last electric tramway ran.

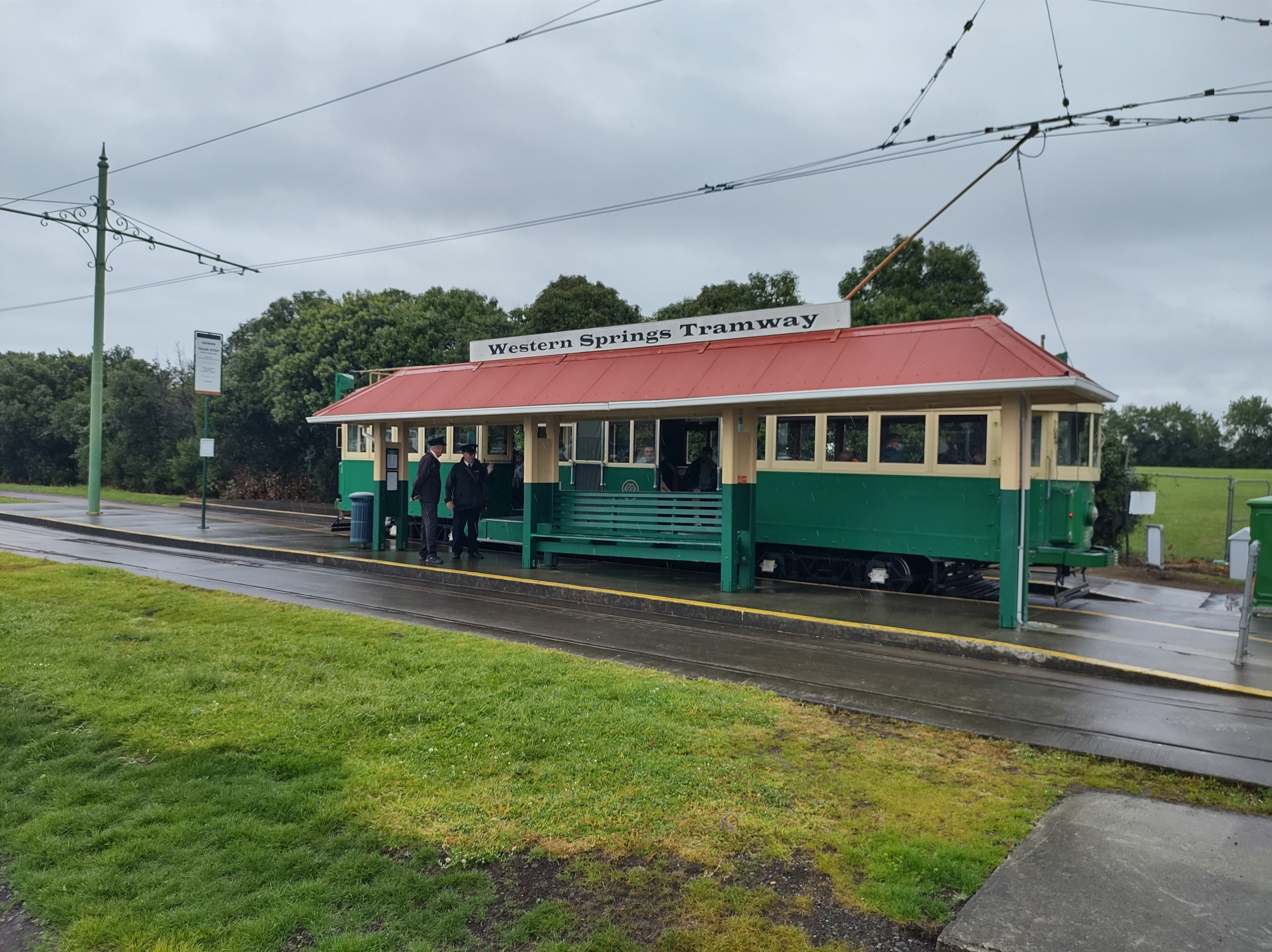
A heritage tram on the Western Springs Tramway

While the introduction of two light railway lines became a government commitment in 2018, as of November 2026 there are currently only two tramway services in Auckland, the Western Springs Tramway and the Dockline Tramway. Both are heritage systems run by the Museum of Transport and Technology (MOTAT). The Western Springs Tramway runs between the two sites of MOTAT, with an intermediate stop at Auckland Zoo. The tracks run parallel to part of the original Point Chevalier tram route on Great North Road, but they were not part of the original system. The Dockline Tramway is a 1.5 km (0.9 mi) circular track in Wynard Quarter.

==== Wynyard loop tram ====
Also known as the Wynyard Quarter tram and Dockline Tram, the service operates on a 1.5 km (0.93 mi) circuit close to downtown Auckland. The route consists of the loop Halsey Street, Gaunt Street, Daldy Street and Jellicoe Street. There have been proposals to extend this in the future. The service was promoted and funded by the former Auckland Regional Council and now by Panuku Development Auckland. The tramway is operated by Auckland Tramways, administered by Panuku Development Auckland. Trams commenced testing and crew training on Friday 29 July 2011. The system was opened on 6 August 2011, prior to the 2011 Rugby World Cup.

Three former Melbourne trams have been used. X1 class 466, (was for a time 2011-2017 renumbered ATL 257), was leased from the Newstead Trams based at Bendigo Tramways and arrived at the Ports of Auckland by ship 8 June 2011 and was delivered to the new tram shed 15 June 2011. From 2011 until 2015, Melbourne W2 class 421, then numbered ATL 258 was leased from Bendigo. In July 2015, SW6 model trams 852 and 881 arrived from Melbourne after becoming surplus to requirements. In September 2011, MOTAT's Western Springs Tramway loaned restored 1906 Auckland tram No.44 for the Auckland Heritage Festival and through summer 2011/12. No.44 was loaned again in September and early October 2012. Ownership of the trams has passed from the Auckland Council / Panuku Development Auckland to MOTAT.

The MOTAT line was extended in 2006–07 to reach a second site of the museum, and the former Auckland Regional Council promoted the creation of an Auckland waterfront tram line, originally with MOTAT vehicles, but will initially operate former Melbourne trams leased from Bendigo Tramways Company Limited. The Auckland Tramway Limited opened 6 August 2011 with the support of Waterfront Auckland (later merged into Panuku Development Auckland) and the new Auckland Council.

The Dockline Tramway was closed a number of times for the gentrification of streets around Wynyard Quarter which have involved re-levelling the roads. For instance in until October 2014, and again from mid 2015 until late 2016 while Gaunt Street and the southern end of Daldy Street were gentrified. In April 2017, trams ran on a short section of the line while roadworks and gentrification took place in Halsey Street and Daldy Street, including watergardens and realignment of the tramway along the reinstated Daldy Street. The Tramway was suspended indefinitely on 5 August 2018 due to Panuku selling an area that included part of its tracks to a developer, but was given a reprieve on 22 November 2018 with Auckland Councillors voting to reinstate the full original loop and have the tram running for the 2021 America's Cup, then review its future. The Dockline Tramway was reported to be re-opening summer 2020, Delayed due COVID-19 lockdowns, the Dockline Tramway was eventually reopened on Sunday 7 February 2021, after Panuku Development Auckland announced that MOTAT would be running the tramway on its behalf. The tramway operates Sundays 10am-4pm and during Public Holiday weekends. In November of 2021 the Auckland Council voted thirteen to six in favour of removing the tramway and the land the sheds now sit on have been sold. The tramway was originally expected to close sometime between April and July 2023 but now expecting for a 2024 date.

==== Devonport ====
The Devonport and Lake Takapuna Tramway Company operated a horse tramway on Auckland's North Shore from September 1886 to February 1887, running from Victoria Wharf to Cheltenham Beach. The tramway was taken over by Richard and Robert Duder (R. & R. Duder Company) in March 1887 and continued to run until June 1888, when all services ceased. The tracks remained in place until December 1894 when the Devonport Borough Council removed them and widened Beach Road (now King Edward Parade).

==== Milford to Bayswater ====
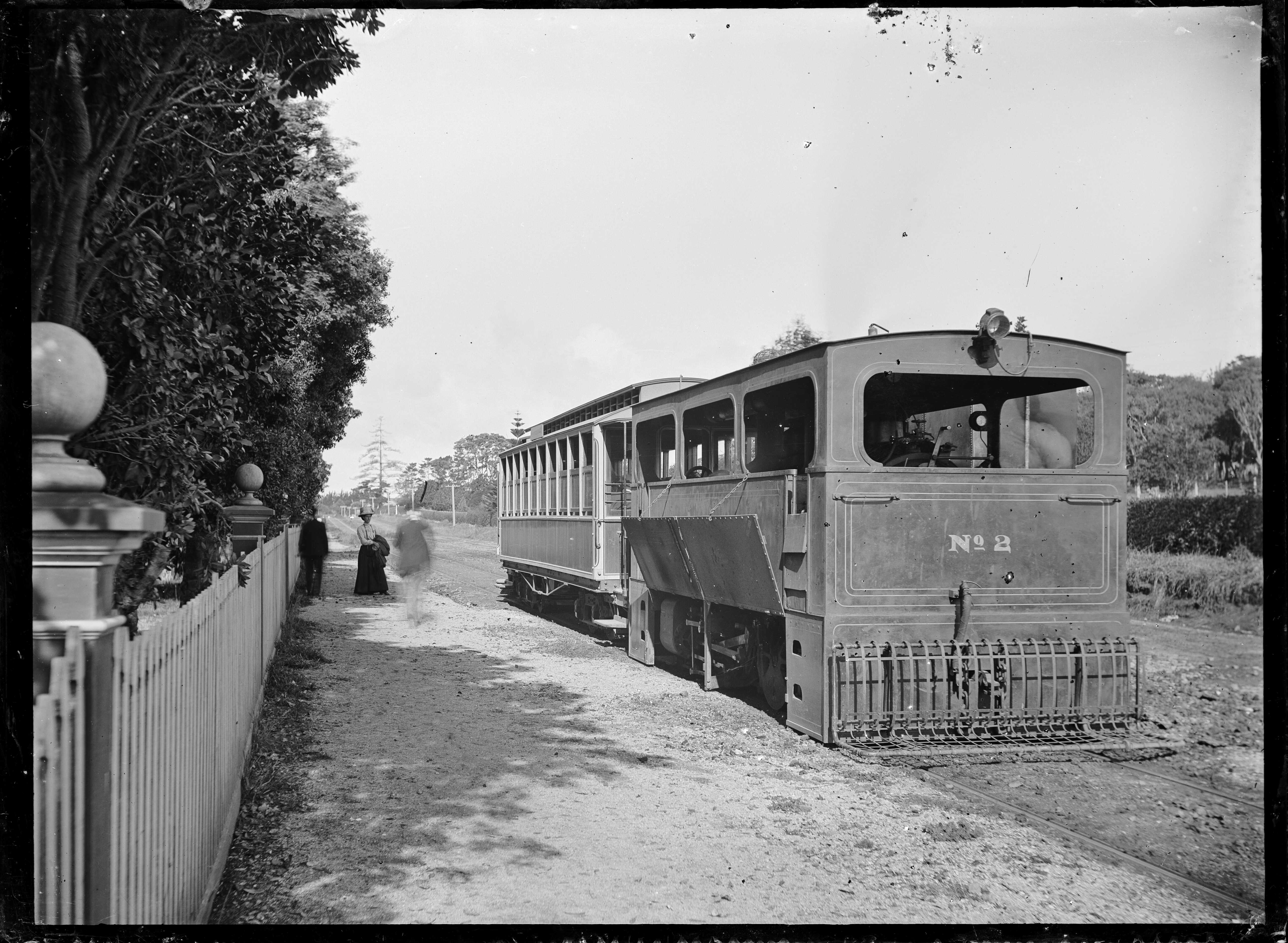
Lake Takapuna steam tram in 1911

In 1907 a group of local businessmen asked Auckland Electric Tramways Company to open an electric tramway on Auckland's North Shore, with a view to funding the scheme through land sales. Auckland Electric Tramways initially investigated the request, later declining it on the basis of a sparse population then on the North Shore. The same businessmen then formed the Takapuna Tramways and Ferry Company Limited to build and operate a ferry and tramway service. Their initial intention was for the tramway to be electrified, but insufficient capital and connections to Auckland's power grid prevented it. The company's ferry, Pupuke, was launched on 15 December 1909, with a new wharf built at Bayswater. The ferry was completed in time for the first service from Auckland City to Bayswater to meet the company's just completed steam tramway on 22 December 1910.

The company's tramway operated between Bayswater and Milford until 26 April 1927. It travelled along Lake Road, through Takapuna and circled Lake Pupuke. Built to standard gauge 1,435 mm (4 ft 8 1/2 in), the steam tram trailers had been built so that they could be converted to electric operation, built from the same plans and therefore to a similar design to Auckland City M and L type trams. The carriages were hauled by steam motors, built by Baldwin Locomotive Works of Philadelphia. Four were built for the tramway. A proposal to electrify the tramway in 1914 was put on hold and then cancelled due to the First World War. Instead, new steam motors arrived in 1919. The company then investigated electrification for a second time, eventually deciding to postpone any investment due to a lack of connection to Auckland's power grid or local power station. With competition from buses increasing, the tramway struggled financially and finally closed after 16 years, its ferries being sold to the Devonport Ferry Company.

The carriages were sold to Wanganui and Dunedin and converted to electric trams and the steam tram boilers were sold for other uses. A single trailer, which became a Dunedin electric tram "Takapuna" No.66, is the sole survivor, with the Otago Early Settlers Museum from the late 1980s, but is being transferred to The Tramway Historical Society based at Ferrymead Christchurch to be restored for use at Ferrymead.

=== Christchurch ===
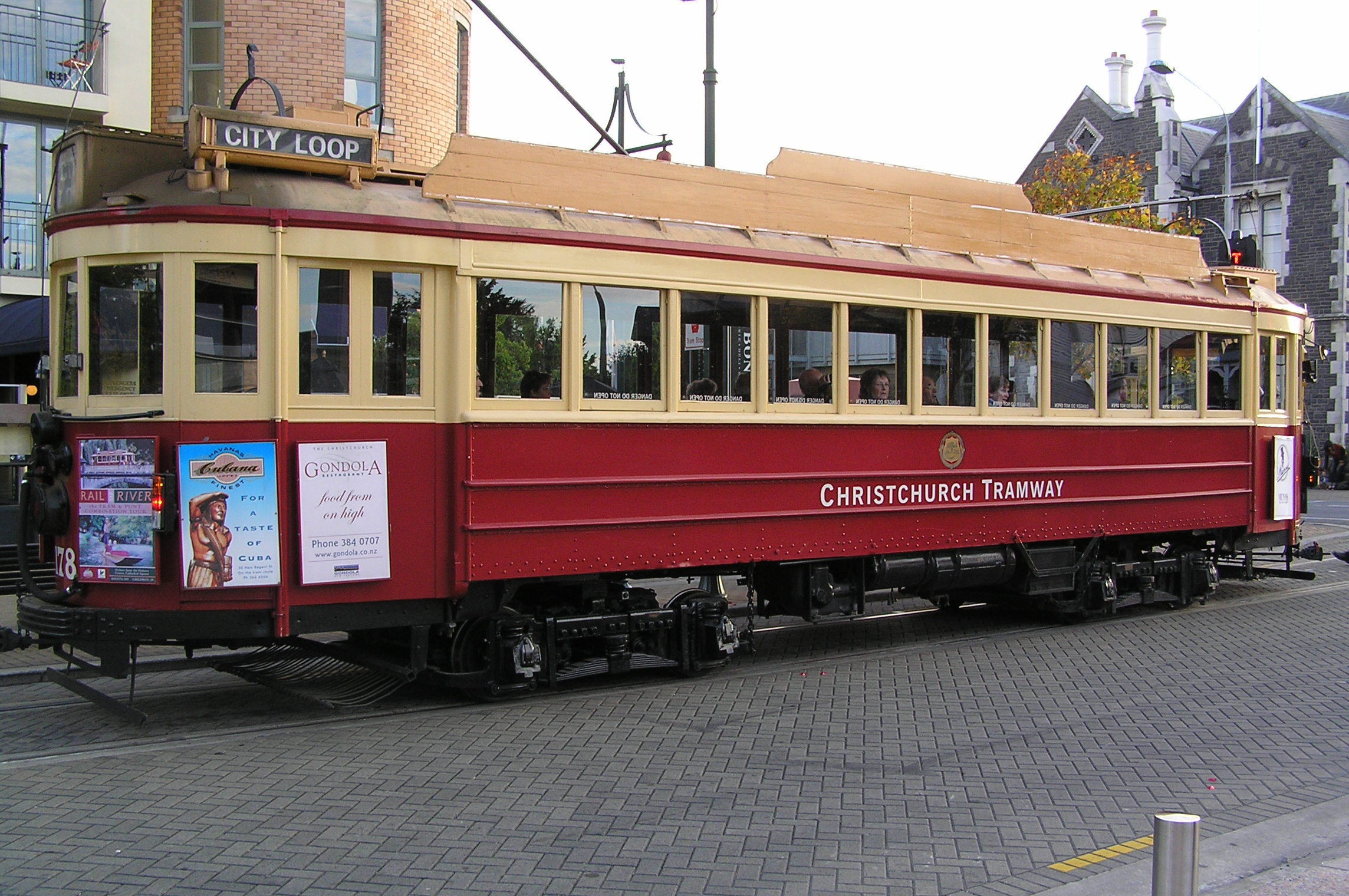
A Christchurch Tramway Tram, Worcester Street, 2005

Christchurch had steam and horse trams from 1880, then electric trams from 6 June 1905 to 11 September 1954. They were replaced by trolleybuses and motor buses. A Christchurch heritage tram line was established in the city centre on a loop track in February 1995, and reopened on a limited circuit on 27 November 2013 after being temporarily non-operational following the Chistchurch earthquake of 22 February 2011, which interrupted tramway services while the CBD was cordoned off. The Tramway reopened on a combination of the original route and an extension that was in progress at the time of the earthquakes. The route was extended in 2014 to include the full pre-earthquake circuit and the extension through the Re:Start Mall and High Street which was nearly complete when the earthquake struck. While these proposals were all officially heritage or tourist lines, there was some investigation into later extension or conversion for normal transport use.

=== Dunedin ===
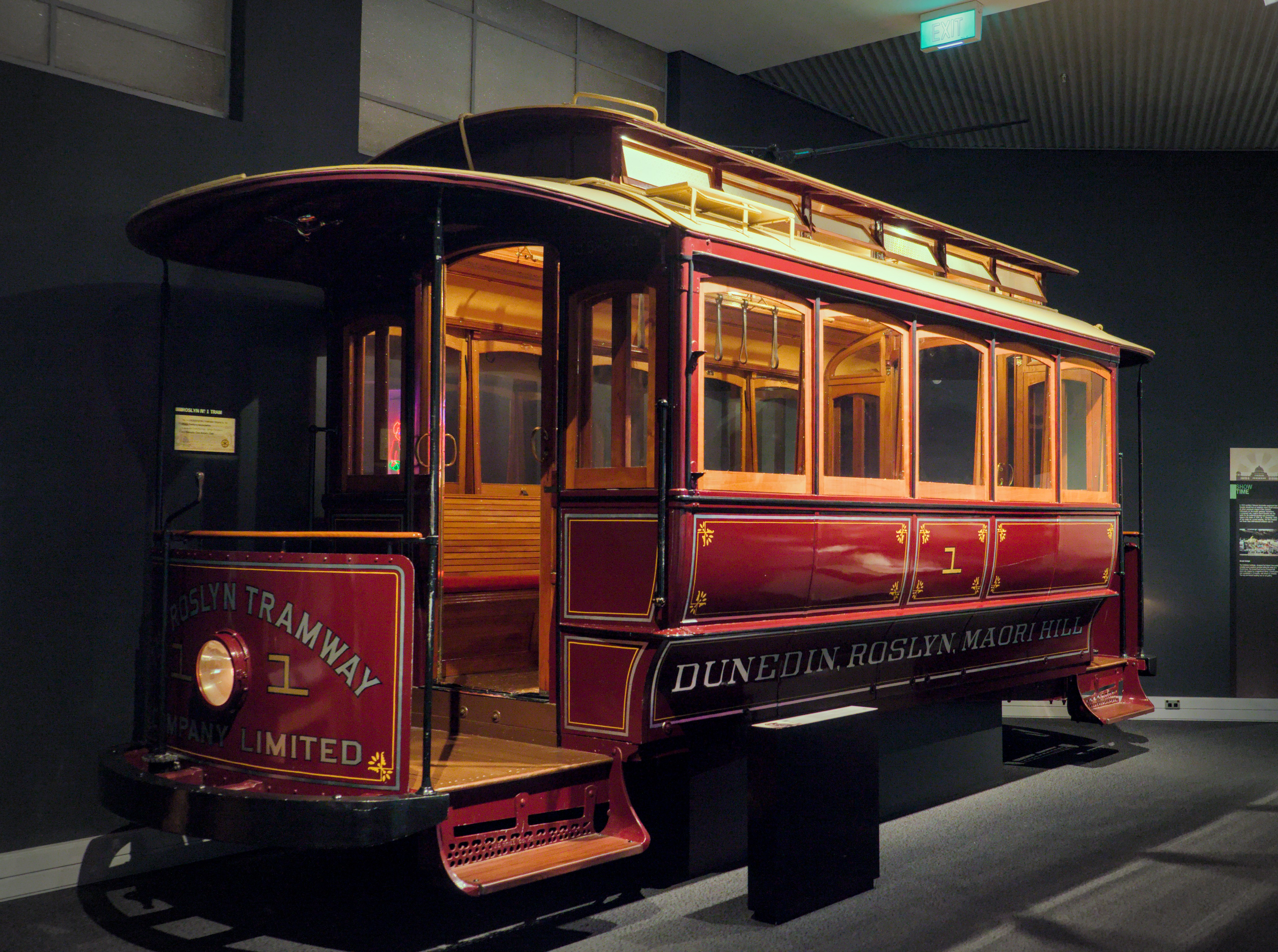
Dunedin tram in Toitū Otago Settlers Museum

Dunedin's first tramway opened in July 1879 with steam and horse trams on a 3 ft 6 in (1,067 mm) gauge, and steam was withdrawn in 1884. Cable trams, also 3 ft 6 in (1,067 mm), followed from 1881. The City Council bought the horse tramway in 1901 and converted it to electric traction, which began carrying the public on 24 December 1903 on a 4 ft 8 in (1,422 mm) gauge. The electric trams ran until 29 March 1956 and were replaced by trolleybuses and buses. A separate 3 ft 6 in (1,067 mm) line to Maori Hill ran electric trams from 23 October 1900 until 1936.

=== Gisborne ===
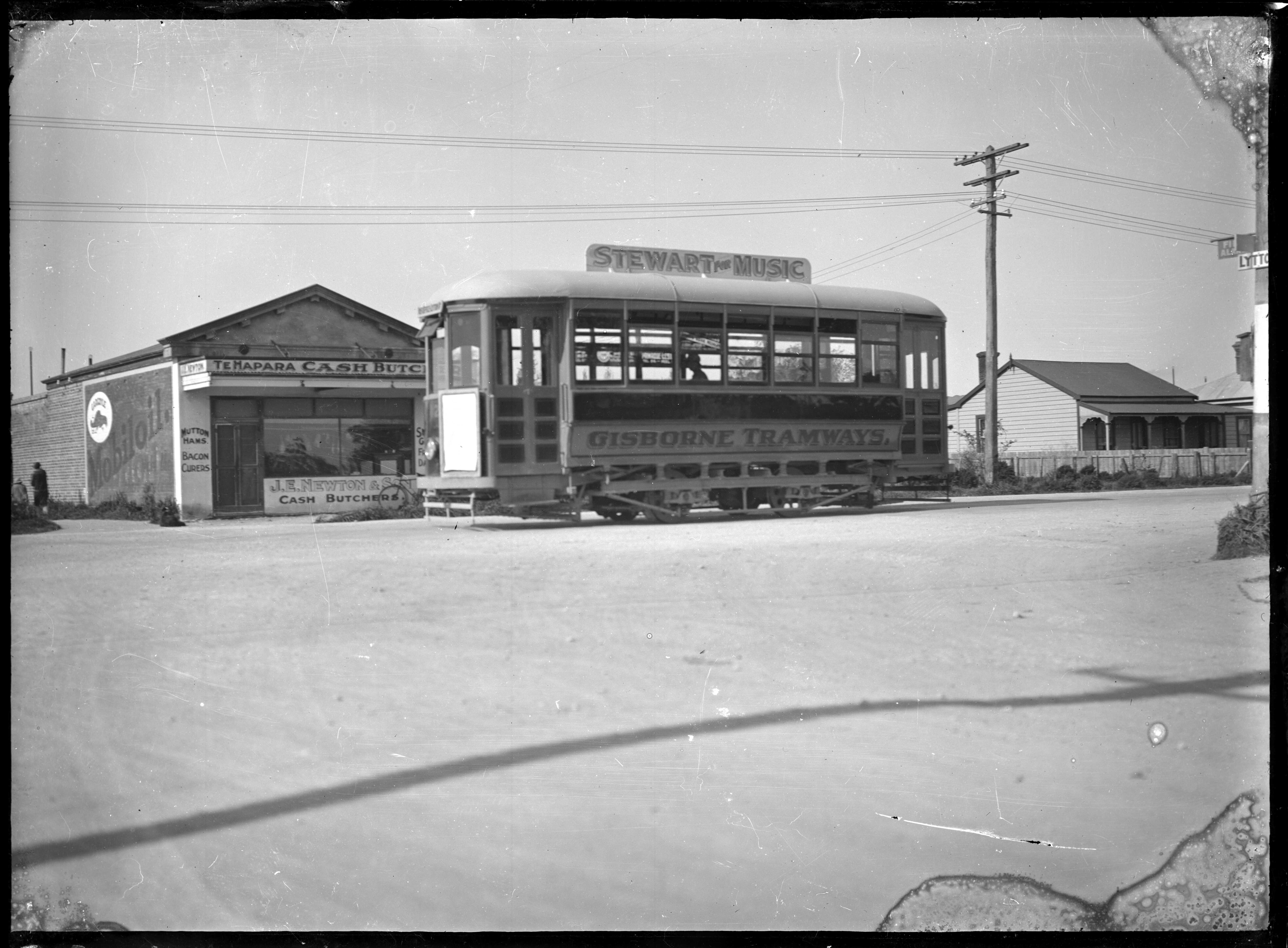
Battery tram in Te Hapara, Gisborne.

Gisborne had Edison-Beach battery-electric trams from 13 April 1913 to 8 July 1929. There were two trams from the Federal Storage Battery Car Co, New Jersey and two from Boon & Co, Christchurch. AR Harris of Christchurch was the New Zealand agent for Edison Batteries. The trams were slow; their maximum speed was 32 km/hour, and initially they were restricted by the Public Works Department to 16 km/hour. There were two inland routes: Ormond Rd, and Gladstone Rd to Te Hapara (Lytton Rd). They were replaced by buses, following a close referendum in 1928.

Auckland Weekly News had photos of the interior and exterior of trams at the 1913 opening.

=== Invercargill ===
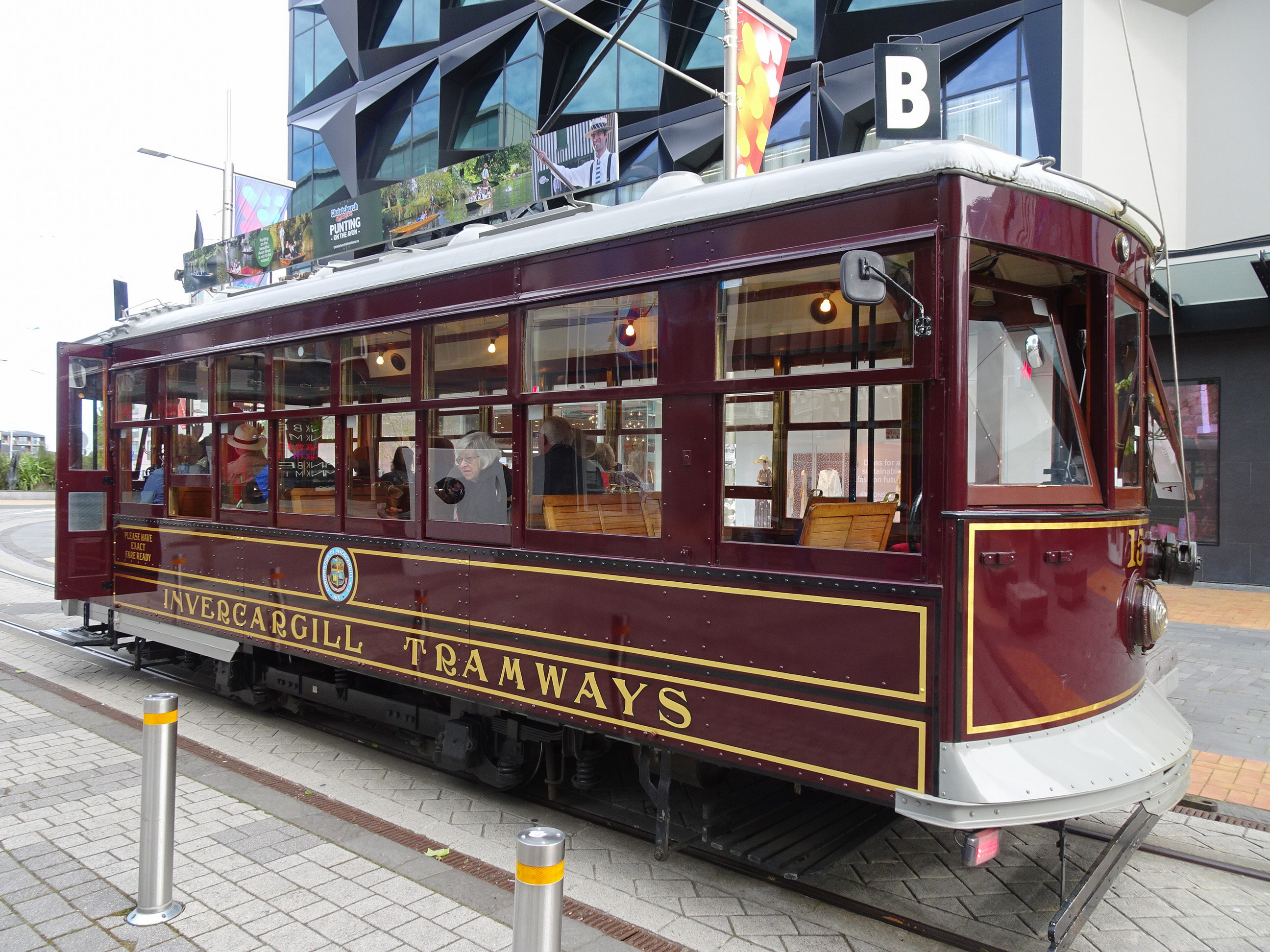
Invercargill Birney tram number 15 in 2019.

Invercargill had the southernmost tram system in the world, horse trams 1881–1908, electric trams from 26 March 1912 to 10 September 1952. They were replaced by buses.

Construction began in January 1911 and lines to Waikiwi and Georgetown opened on 26 March 1912. Later that year two more lines opened, to North Invercargill and South Invercargill; the latter was the southernmost electrified street tram line in the world and ran to Tramway Road. The network operated as two routes: Route A between Georgetown and Waikiwi and Route B between North and South Invercargill. The Waikiwi line closed in 1947, though a section remained in operation until 1951. The Georgetown route closed on 2 July 1951, but the section to Rugby Park Stadium remained open until August 1951. The South Invercargill line closed on 31 May 1952. The last route, to North Invercargill, closed on 10 September 1952.

=== Napier ===
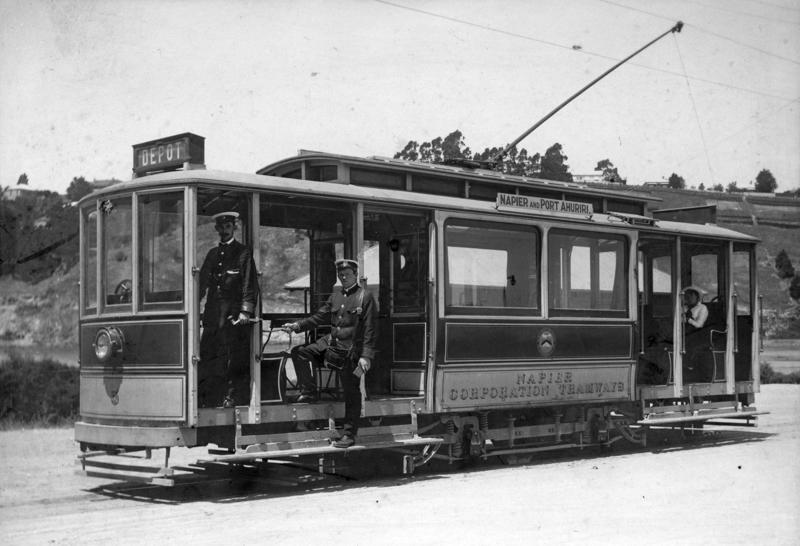
This photograph shows one of the trams that operated between Napier and Ahuriri between 1913 and 1931

Napier had electric trams to Port Ahuriri, from 8 September 1913 to 3 February 1931. The system was damaged by the Hawke's Bay earthquake on 3 February 1931 and was never restored, being replaced by buses. There was considerable debate about removing the trams, and their tracks and most of the overhead power lines remained in place for five years after the earthquake, a decision to remove them only came in March 1936.

=== New Plymouth ===
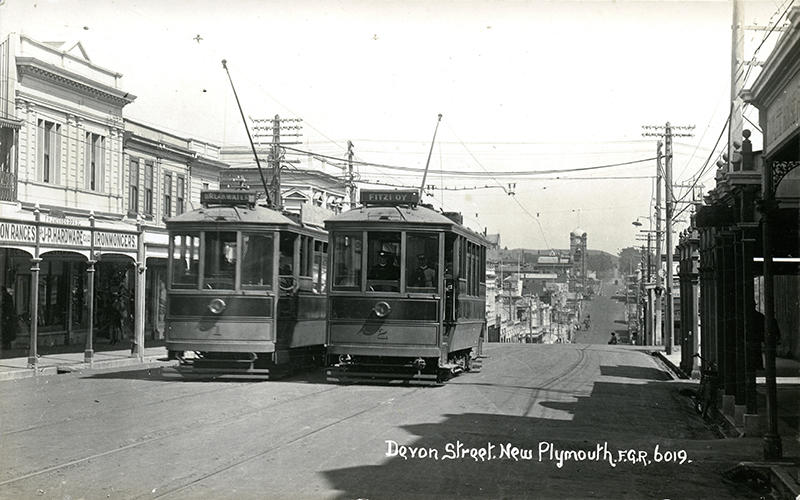
New Plymouth trams number 1 (service to Breakwater) and 2 (service to Fitzroy) in 1916.

New Plymouth had an electric tram service from 10 March 1916 to 23 July 1954, operated by the New Plymouth Corporation Tramways and reputedly the smallest municipality in the world to operate trams on the overhead electricity system. There were two main routes, through the town centre from the Port to Fitzroy, and from the town centre to David Street, Westown. In 1924 a short line was built to Pukekura Park (this closed in 1937) and proposals were also made for lines to Vogeltown and Frankleigh Park.

The Westown route was replaced with a fleet of 4 Crossley trolleybuses in 1950, in turn being replaced with diesel buses in October 1967. The Port-Fitzroy route was replaced directly by diesel buses in 1954.

There were 10 trams, 4 single-truck Boon cars (No.s 1–4), 3 Double-truck Boon cars (Nos 5–6 and 10) and 3 Birney Safety Cars introduced in 1921 (Nos. 7–9). These all lasted until closure of the system, at which time the bodies were auctioned off and sold. Only one tram body survives (Birney No 8) and is currently in Whanganui.

=== Whanganui ===
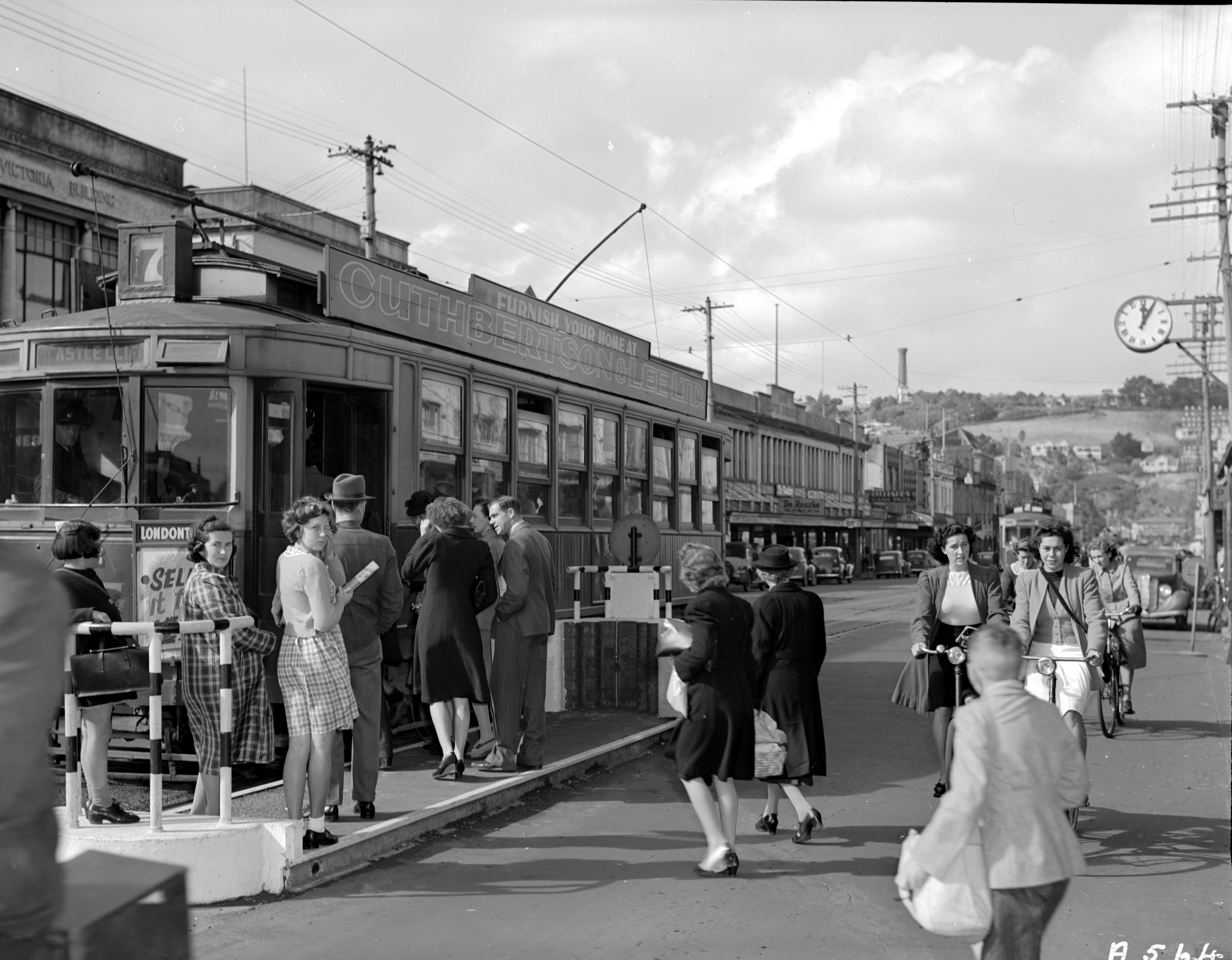
Tram to Castlecliff, Whanganui circa late 1940s

Whanganui, then known as Wanganui, had electric trams from 11 December 1908 to 24 September 1950. The service went two ways from the city centre, inland to Aramoho and out to Castlecliff and the Port (from 17 October 1912). The Castlecliff route competed with the Castlecliff railway and the success of the trams at winning patronage led to the cancellation of passenger trains in April 1932. The trams were replaced by buses.

Wanganui tram No.12 was restored in West Auckland by Dave Harre and his team and gifted to the people of Whanganui. The Tramways Whanganui Trust has united the body onto a former Brussels Brill 21e type four-wheel truck, and plans to renovate Wanganui tram No.8, New Plymouth Birney No.8 and Brisbane No.133. 120m of tramline has been laid alongside the Whanganui river between the new tram shed towards the berth of the PS Waimarie and runs regularly for the public. Further extensions have been mooted into the city streets.

=== Wellington ===
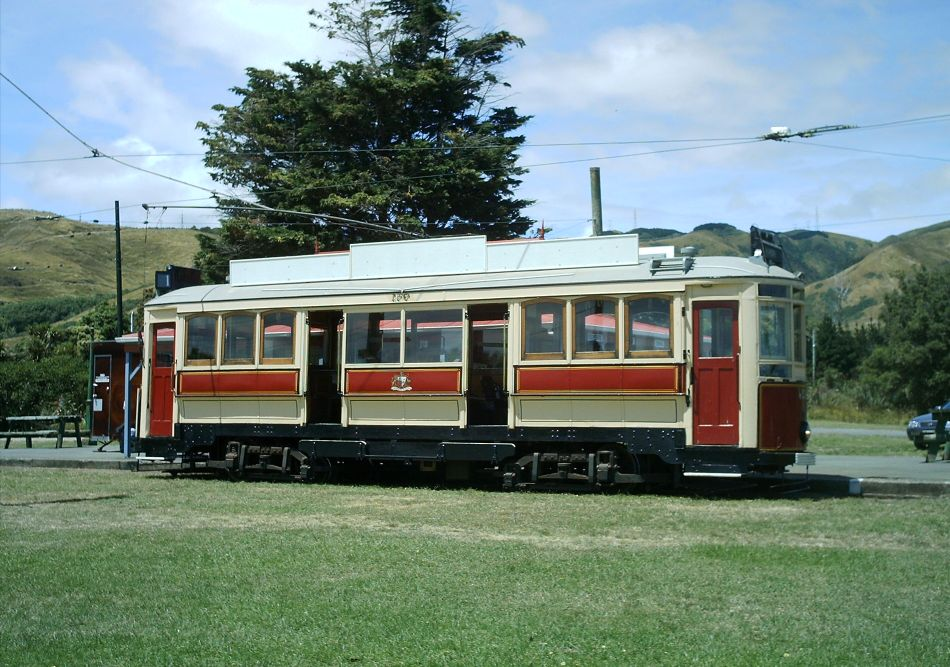
A former Wellington tram at the Wellington Tramway Museum.

Wellington had steam and horse trams from 1878 to 1904 and electric trams from 30 June 1904 to 2 May 1964. Trolleybuses and buses replaced them. Wellington now has the only funicular cable car line operating in New Zealand.

The Wellington Tramway Museum preserves and operates a collection of Wellington trams at the Kapiti Coast Electric Tramway, located in Queen Elizabeth Park near Mackays Crossing on the Kāpiti Coast.

There was a plan for a light rail system in Wellington to be underway, but in mid-December 2023, the Minister of Transport, Simeon Brown, ordered the New Zealand Transport Agency to cease funding.

=== West Coast ===
Other horse-drawn tram systems were built on the West Coast of the South Island, where a gold rush started in 1864. The main towns, Greymouth, Westport, Hokitika and Ross, and smaller settlements like Brighton, Charleston, Kamiere and Kumara had wooden tramways. Publican John Behan of Charleston, now a ghost town, petitioned the Canterbury Provincial Council in 1870 for compensation after the rerouting of a wooden tramway along a branch road removed most of his stalwart drinkers. The 'bush tram' from Greymouth to Kumara took three hours, and during the trip passengers had to cross the Taramakau River in a cage or 'flying fox' riding on two wires. These tramways were for freight and passengers. There were few roads on the coast, and tramway owners were entitled to charge a toll to pedestrians walking along the tracks. The gauges varied from 3 ft (914 mm) to 4 ft (1,219 mm), with 3-inch (76 mm) wooden rails (see Stewart and May). Some of these were bush tramways, similar to other systems used to carry timber out of the bush.

== Rolling stock ==
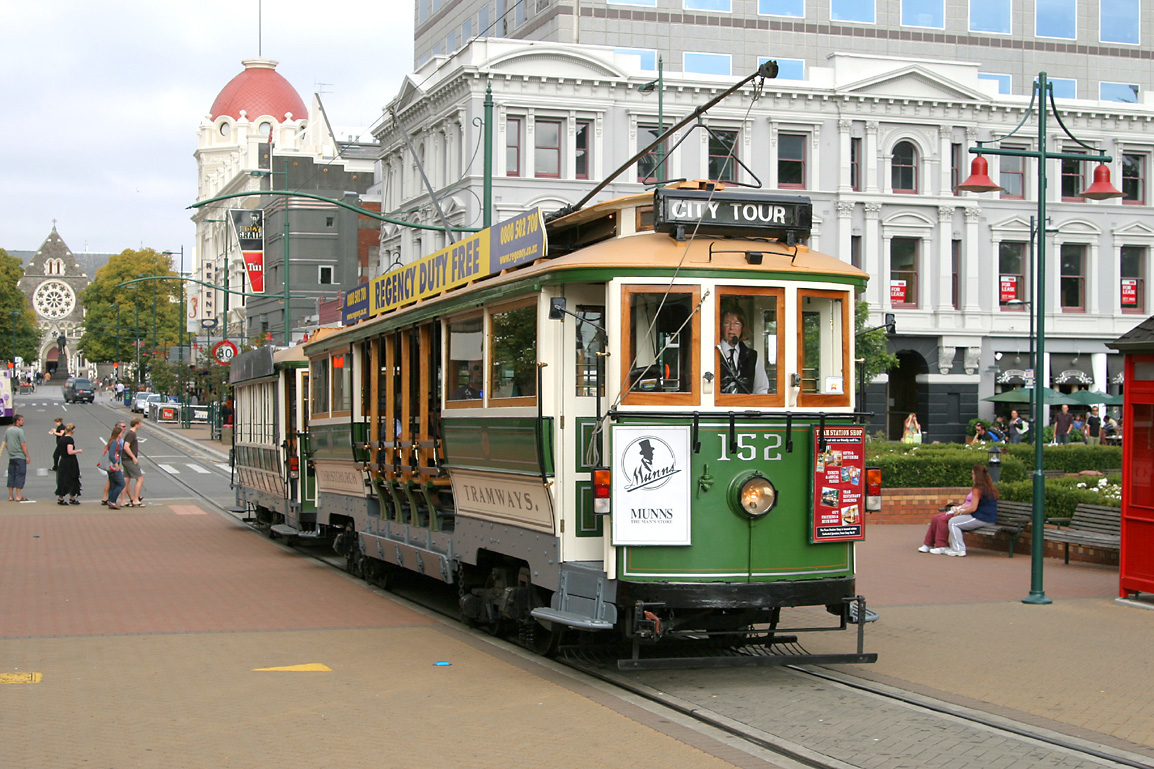
Christchurch Boon tram No. 152 with trailer No. 115, showing the lowered central boarding section

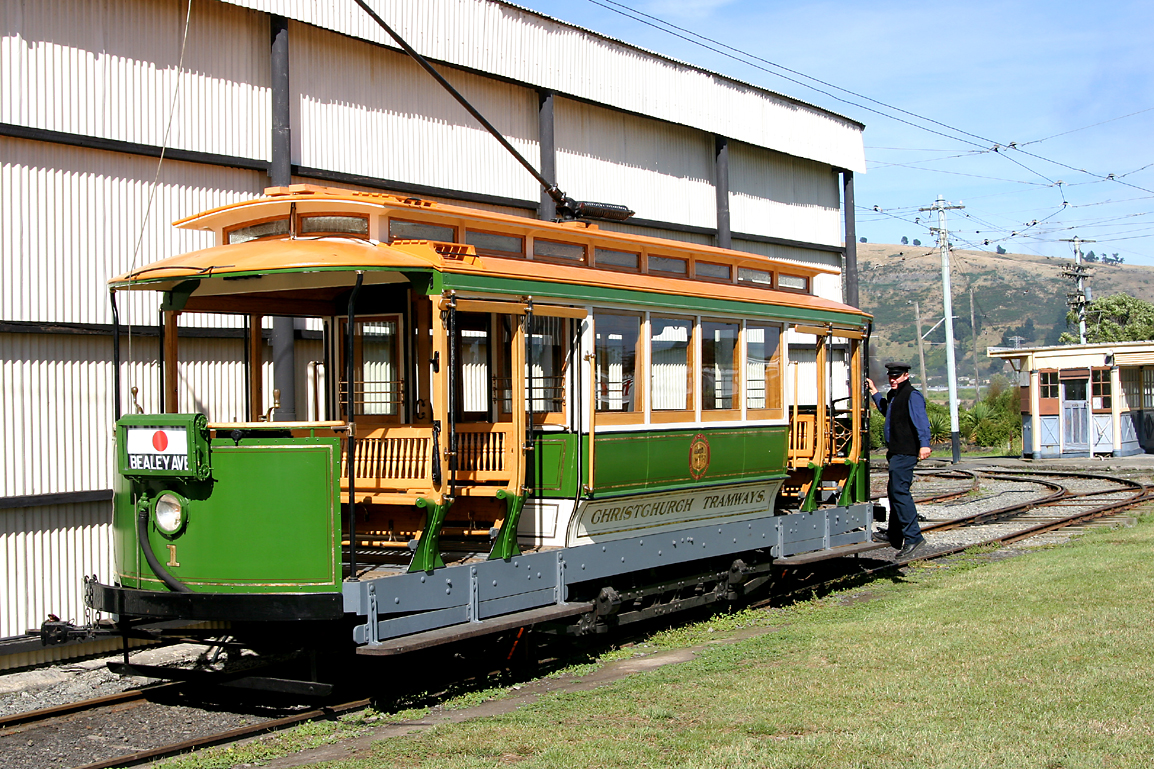
Christchurch Californian combination tram No. 1, built by John Stephenson & Co., at Ferrymead

New Zealand tramway systems used a mixture of imported and locally manufactured rolling stock. Major overseas suppliers included the American J. G. Brill Company of Philadelphia and John Stephenson & Co., together with British manufacturers such as Brush Electrical Engineering. Local manufacturers, including Boon & Co. of Christchurch and Auckland coachbuilders, also constructed tramcars. Several operators subsequently built or rebuilt vehicles in their own workshops.

=== Tramcar designs ===
Several distinctive types of tramcar were used throughout New Zealand:

- Boxcars were fully enclosed saloon cars, generally mounted on a single four-wheel truck. They formed part of Dunedin's original electric fleet, introduced in 1903.
- Californian combination cars had an enclosed central saloon with open-sided passenger sections at either end. They were used on several systems, including Christchurch, Dunedin and Whanganui.
- Toastrack cars had open sides, with transverse seating and roofs supported by upright stanchions. Dunedin's original electric fleet included both Californian combination and toastrack cars, alongside the enclosed boxcars.
- Drop-centre cars featured a lowered central section between the bogies, reducing the number of steps required for passengers to board. Christchurch introduced locally built drop-centre tramcars in 1906, designed by tramway engineer Scott Symington and constructed by Boon & Co.
- Double-deck cars provided additional passenger capacity, with open upper decks on early examples. Auckland, Wellington and Christchurch operated powered double-deck electric trams. Christchurch also used double-deck trailers, including former horse and steam tramcars adapted for haulage behind electric cars.

Not all electric tramways drew power from overhead wires. The Gisborne tramway, which opened in 1913, used cars equipped with Edison storage batteries. Initially two cars were supplied, with another two subsequently added. Gisborne was the only New Zealand tramway system operated entirely by battery-electric cars.

Later developments included Wellington's Fiducia class, first developed in the 1930s. These fully enclosed tramcars incorporated air-operated doors, folding steps and improved passenger accommodation, with later examples featuring upholstered seating and bus-style windows. Although designed to permit one-person operation, the cars continued to operate with both motormen and conductors.

=== Birney Safety Cars ===
In 1921, Birney Safety Cars manufactured by the J. G. Brill Company were supplied to Invercargill (six cars) and New Plymouth (three cars). These lightweight, steel-bodied trams were designed for operation by a single motorman without a conductor.

Their safety features included an automatic emergency braking system, known as a dead man's control, which operated if the driver released the controller handle. Interlocking mechanisms prevented the tram from moving while its doors were open or its folding steps lowered.

During a demonstration in New Plymouth, Gordon Coates, then Minister of Public Works, was reportedly thrown from his seat when the driver activated the dead man's control, bringing the tram to an abrupt stop.

Napier also considered acquiring lightweight American single-operator tramcars in 1920. However, the manufacturer supplied cars designed for a wider track gauge than Napier's 3 ft 6 in (1,067 mm) system, presenting an obstacle to their introduction.

=== Auckland tramcar development ===
The Auckland Electric Tramways Company initially imported tramcars from Britain, with the earliest vehicles supplied by Brush Engineering as kitsets for local assembly. Subsequent cars were increasingly constructed by Auckland coachbuilders, including Cousins & Atkin, and later in the tramway's own workshops at Royal Oak on Manukau Road.

Early designs. The initial fleet included small four-wheeled A-class cars, nicknamed dinghies, with rear entrances, as well as open toastrack cars and B-class Californian combination cars. The latter established a general layout with entrances at either end and boarding steps contained within the bodyline of the tramcar. A small number of C-class open-top double-deck cars were also introduced, although the type proved unsuitable for long-term operation and was eventually converted to single-deck use.

Enclosed saloon cars. Successive designs incorporated windscreens and improved protection for passengers and motormen. The M-class cars, introduced from 1907, included separate driving compartments and accommodation for 52 seated passengers. A total of 99 M-class cars were constructed, making them the most numerous class in the Auckland fleet.

Semi-steel and larger cars. During the 1920s, Auckland experimented with semi-steel construction, incorporating riveted steel framing and updated body designs. The N-class cars introduced Art Deco styling and revised passenger door arrangements. Thirteen semi-steel cars, numbered 191–203, entered service during 1925–26.

A distinctive feature of Auckland tramcars was their paired destination indicators, arranged in a V-shape at each end of the vehicle. The angled displays enabled destinations to be read even when tramcars stood close together. These indicators remained characteristic of the fleet until closure.

Wooden body construction was retained for the larger cars introduced in 1929–30, commonly known as the Big Cars, which incorporated further refinements to passenger accommodation and seating arrangements.

Streamliners. The final major development was the Streamliner design of the 1930s, distinguished by rounded ends and curved body sides. The later 1937-class Streamliners, designed by Victor Gibbon, featured bodies widening from approximately 7 ft 6 in (2.29 m) at chassis level to 8 ft (2.44 m) at window-sill level, before narrowing again towards the roof. Despite their more modern appearance, the cars retained wooden seating and traditional half-drop windows.

Six later Streamliners were fitted with imported EMB L5 bogies, manufactured by the Electro Mechanical Braking Company in Britain. These incorporated improved suspension, roller bearings and modern braking equipment, while other cars retained Brush-designed bogies. The EMB-equipped cars had smaller wheels, allowing their bodies to sit closer to the track.

The Streamliners represented the final generation of tramcars built for Auckland before the system closed in December 1956.

=== Track gauges ===
New Zealand's electric tramways used several different track gauges, with most operating on 1,435 mm (4 ft 8 1/2 in).

Track gauge	Electric tramway systems
1,435 mm (4 ft 8 1/2 in)	Auckland, Christchurch, Invercargill, New Plymouth and Whanganui
4 ft (1,219 mm)	Wellington and Gisborne
4 ft 8 in (1,422 mm)	Dunedin municipal electric tramways
3 ft 6 in (1,067 mm)	Napier and the separate Māori Hill electric tramway in Dunedin

The gauges shown are those used by the electric tramway systems. Earlier horse and steam tramways sometimes operated on different gauges. For example, Dunedin's original horse and steam tramways used 3 ft 6 in (1,067 mm), while the municipal electric network adopted 4 ft 8 in (1,422 mm). Wellington also changed its track gauge when the system was electrified in 1904.

== Museums ==
There are several tram/transport museums with operating vintage trams:

- The Museum of Transport and Technology (MOTAT) in Auckland has the Western Springs Tramway with 1.72 km (1.07 mi) of track, running alongside Western Springs Park parallel to Great North and Motions Roads to Auckland Zoo, across Motions Road and to the second MOTAT site. Museum tram operations commenced within MOTAT on 16 December 1967, to the Motions Road corner in 1980, to the Zoo in 1981 and to MOTAT's Aviation and Railway site in April 2007.
- Tramways Wanganui Trust New Group formed to complete and look after Wanganui tram No.12 which was donated to the City of Wanganui after the body was privately restored in Auckland. Also plans to renovate Wanganui tram No.8 and New Plymouth Birney No.8 (yes duplicate fleet numbers) and Brisbane No.133 which were all donated to them un-restored by the Wellington Tramway Museum. They will run on a 120 m (130 yd) heritage line built alongside the Whanganui River between the new tram shed and towards the berth of the P.S. Waimarie. The names of Wanganui and Whanganui and now both in use for the city.
- Wellington Tramway Museum at Queen Elizabeth Park, Paekākāriki (near Wellington); started 1965.
- Tramway Historical Society operating the Ferrymead Tramway at Ferrymead Heritage Park, Christchurch, trams started 1968 (steam) and 1970 (electric).
- Christchurch Tramway Ltd in central Christchurch since 1995
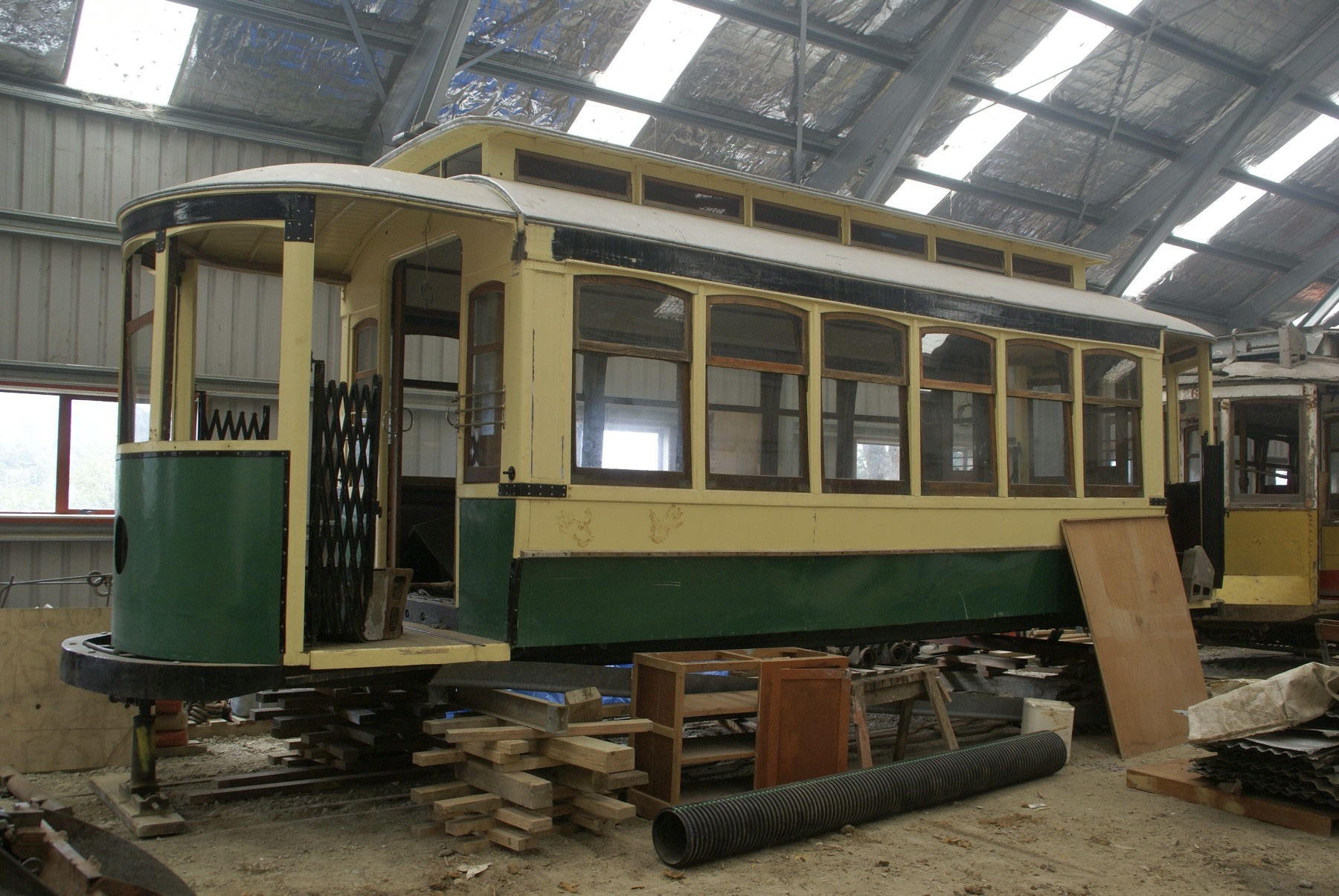
- Whangarei: Former Lisbon nos. 526 and 520 (right, back).
  Whangarei Steam and Model Railway Club has two 900 mm or 2 ft 11 7/16 in gauge former Lisbon trams 520 and 526 acquired by Dave Harre for a Heritage Trams for Henderson project in Auckland he was promoting, having previously been stored in Aspen, Colorado for another promoted tramway. One of the Lisbon tram bodies was restored by Harre's group prior to the Henderson project being abandoned and the trams being acquired by the Whangarei Group, which intended building an operating tramway attraction.
- Bill Richardson Transport World museum in Invercargill has preserved Invercargill Birney Safety Car No.16. Recovered from Davaar sheep station near The Key.
- Toitū Otago Settlers Museum in Dunedin has a number of former Dunedin Cable Cars and Electric Tramcars in their static collection.

== See also ==
- List of town tramway systems in Oceania
- Public transport in New Zealand
- Trams in Australia
- Auckland Tram Number 304
