= City Centre–Māngere Line =

Planned light rail line in Auckland, New Zealand

City Centre-Mangere Line (CC2M)

Overview
- Status: Investigation, planning, and design Mode and route to be confirmed
- Locale: Auckland, New Zealand
- Termini: Within the City Centre, possibly Wynyard Quarter; Within Mangere, likely Auckland Airport

Service
- Type: Light Rail (likely)
- System: Auckland Transport

Technical
- Line length: 24 km (15 mi)

The City Centre–Māngere Line is a proposed rapid transit corridor in Auckland, New Zealand, intended to link the City Centre to Auckland Airport in Māngere through the Auckland central isthmus. Plans for rapid transit along this corridor have generally involved light rail as the mode, because forecasted demand is too high for buses to be sufficient. The most substantive plans for this corridor were by the Sixth Labour Government and involved a 24km light rail line that partially ran underground, until these plans were cancelled by the Sixth National Government in 2024. At an estimated cost of $14.6 billion the planned line would have been the single largest transport project in New Zealand history. Future plans for the corridor have yet to be confirmed, with Auckland Transport and other agencies investigating the corridor as part of plans for developing a network of rapid transit in Auckland.

== History ==
=== Initial proposals (pre 2017) ===
==== City Centre Light Rail ====
Around 2015, Auckland Transport (AT) began investigating light rail as a method of relieving heavy bus congestion on arterial roads. AT's Chief Engineer pointed to the fact that major bus corridors, such as Fanshawe Street and Symonds Street, were carrying as many as 150 buses an hour at the time. AT believed that solutions such as double-decker buses and bus rapid transit would do little to address the issue as they would not provide sufficient capacity in the long-term. Many of these corridors also ran through what were deemed to be "critical locations [that] cannot be served effectively by commuter rail" such as university campuses and the Wynyard Quarter, therefore a solution in-between bus routes and heavy rail would need to be found. Light Rail appeared in the 2015-2025 Auckland Regional Land Transport Plan with Queen Street, Symonds Street, Dominion Road, Sandringham Road, Manukau Road, and Mt Eden Road considered to be the most appropriate corridors for light rail. Incidentally, these were routes that had been served by tram lines up until the mid-1950s.

In early 2016, AT was considering light rail options between the City Centre and the outer Auckland Isthmus. It was proposed that light rail would start with a Wynyard Quarter to Britomart connection, it would then run along Queen Street and Dominion Road to Mt Roskill before terminating at a depot in Sandringham.

==== Extension to Māngere and Auckland Airport ====
At around the same time, AT was investigating rapid transit options to Auckland Airport and the surrounding Māngere area. Extending the isthmus light rail line to the airport began to be considered as a possibility in late 2015. A heavy rail connection was the existing preference but AT decided to explore light rail as a potential alternative, comparing the two rail options as part of their investigation.

In early 2016, AT was progressing work to compare extending the planned light rail system or the existing heavy rail system to the Airport and Mangere. Early figures released in a video by AT suggested that a light rail extension performed better than a heavy rail extension on most metrics. Light rail was expected to have a greater catchment (of both people and jobs as well as future growth), a lower cost, and a higher benefit-cost-ratio.

2016 comparison estimates done by AT
Heavy Rail		Light Rail
24,000	People living within 800m of station along route	60,000
57,000	Jobs within 800m of station along route	63,000
35–38 minutes	Travel time between airport and city centre	46–49 minutes
$1.6-2.0 billion	Total infrastructure cost estimate	$0.9-1.0 billion
2,760	Hourly capacity (passengers per hour in each direction)	1,630
+20,500 people +17,700 jobs	Total employment and population growth within catchment	+54,000 people +68,000 jobs
0.3-0.5	Benefit-cost-ratio	0.8-1.2

On 27 June 2016, AT and the NZTA decided that light rail would be the preferred option for a rapid transit connection to the airport. The two transport agencies concluded that an extension of the Onehunga Line to the airport would be too expensive and "poor value for money" when contrasted to light rail. Light rail seemed to be more favored due to the idea of "two for the price of one" where the entire City Centre–Māngere Line could be built for around the same cost as it would take to extend the heavy rail network to the airport. The Prime Minister at-the-time, John Key, was supportive of the decision stating that he "would have thought the right decision has been made that other alternatives should be explored."

Several days later, on 30 June 2016, AT released the report examining rapid transit in South-West Auckland and the airport area.

==== Advanced Bus Solution ====
In the first half of 2017, the NZTA investigated an "Advanced Bus Solution" as an intermediate step to the implementation of the City Centre-Māngere Light Rail line. This was reportedly due to the unwillingness of the Fifth National Government to fund light rail, with light rail only a potential follow-up to the "Advanced Bus Solution" after 30 years.

==== 2017 Election ====
Auckland light rail featured prominently at the 2017 election, with the Labour Party promising to build light rail from the Wynyard Quarter to Mt Roskill within four years. This would be followed by light rail from Mt Roskill to the airport within ten years. The Green Party was also supportive of the City Centre–Māngere Line, promising light rail to the airport by 2021. This was to be done by fast-tracking the current plans that were not going to be implemented for another 30 years and by investigating additional funding sources (such as land-value capture) to get the $2.3 billion needed to fund the project. The then-transport minister Simon Bridges responded by saying that he didn't think that it was feasible to bring light rail forward to 2021, stating that "We support route protection now, and we want to have a public transport corridor. Moving from bus to light rail is probably a question of when there is demand for it." He also stated that the recently opened Waterview (road) tunnel had already made significant differences to travel times to the airport.

=== 2017–2024 ===
Following the 2017 election the City Centre-Māngere line was a key policy in the formation of the Sixth Labour Government, with the confidence and supply agreement between the Labour Party and the Green Party (one of the two junior partners, alongside New Zealand First) including a promise to begin work on light rail to the airport.

However, by early 2018 it was apparent that the government would not achieve its goal of building the line in time for the 2021 America's Cup and APEC Summit. Instead, it was thought that construction would start in 2020 and be completed by 2025 in a best-case scenario.

The government launched the procurement process in May 2018 to investigate and decide on financing and delivery options for the City Centre-Māngere line as well as the Northwest Light Rail Line. It was revealed that the New Zealand Super Fund had already expressed interest in forming an international consortium to design, build, and operate both of the planned lines on the light rail network. The proposal included the fund partnering with CDPQ Infra to deliver the network.

By January 2022, eventual plans for the City Centre-Māngere line involved a "tunneled light rail" approach, estimated to cost $14.6 billion. This iteration would have seen the line travel through a tunnel from Wynyard Quarter to Mt Roskill before continuing above ground to Māngere and the airport. If implemented it would have been the single largest transport project in New Zealand history, beating out the $4.4 billion City Rail Link currently under construction in central Auckland. The line would have followed a 24 km route, passing through 18 stations. In December 2023, the project had an estimated cost of $12.6bn and a benefit-cost ratio of 2.4, indicating $2.4 of benefits for every $1 invested. Trains would have run every 5 minutes at peak, with capacity to increase as demand grows.

Comparison of preferred and alternative options (December 2023) - Auckland Light Rail Ltd.
	Preferred option	Alternative option
Type	Light metro (grade separated)	Light rail (street-running)
Capacity	19,800 people per hour, per direction	6,990 people per hour, per direction
Travel time	Auckland Airport to Wynyard Quarter (City Centre) - 38 minutes Mt. Roskill to University (City Centre) - 10 minutes	Auckland Airport to Wynyard Quarter (City Centre) - 58 minutes Mt. Roskill to University (City Centre) - 30 minutes (19 min journey + 11 minute walk)
Cost estimate	$12.6bn	$9.0bn
Benefit-cost ratio (BCR)	2.4	2.4
Urban form	75,000 additional homes 122,000 additional jobs	48,000 additional homes 84,000 additional jobs

City Centre-Māngere was listed in the 2023 Auckland Rapid Transit Plan as one of the corridors in Auckland's future rapid transit network. The plan described it as a "proposed corridor" between the City Centre and Auckland Airport through Mt Roskil, Onehunga, and Māngere to address bus congestion issues on the busy bus routes operating in these areas. It listed light rail as the preferred mode to be able to meet high forecast future of 5000-7000 passengers per peak hour that could not be met through bus improvements along the corridor. However, the plan did not indicate preference for a particular type of light rail along the corridor and had it running along Dominion Road as opposed to Sandringham Road where the government's tunneled light rail was planned to run. City Centre-Māngere was in Phase 1 of the plan, Phase 1 being the corridors that were "under construction or have confirmed funding."

==== Cancellation ====
Central government involvement in the current plans for light rail in Auckland were cancelled by the Sixth National Government on 14 January 2024.

=== 2025-Present ===
City Centre-Māngere was included in the 2025 Auckland Rapid Transit Pathway jointly produced by Auckland Transport and the NZTA; an update to the Auckland Rapid Transit Plan. However, it was reclassified as "mode to be confirmed" instead of light rail. Delivery of the first stage of the corridor was placed under "medium term priorities," with bus improvements occurring in the short term while the route and mode for the corridor is confirmed. The plan noted that rapid transit along the corridor could be implemented in three stages: City Centre to Mt Roskill, Mt Roskill to Onehunga, and Onehunga to the airport.

== See also ==
- Light rail in Auckland
- Public transport in Auckland
