= Light rail in Auckland =

Auckland, New Zealand's largest city, was served by an extensive tram network up until the mid-20th century. However, as of 2025, the only remaining light rail lines are heritage tramways. Recently, it has considered reintroducing light rail lines to replace some of its most heavily used bus routes. Many line proposals have involved reusing the routes of Auckland's former tram system.

In 2015 the city's transport agency, Auckland Transport, proposed a new light rail network – with a focus on a line between the Auckland CBD and Auckland Airport. In subsequent years, various technology types and modes were proposed by local and central government – including traditional street tramways and light metro. The most recent plans, proposed by the Sixth Labour Government, would have seen the construction of a hybrid underground/surface route. However, that particular project was cancelled by the Sixth National Government in January 2024.

== History ==
=== Original system ===
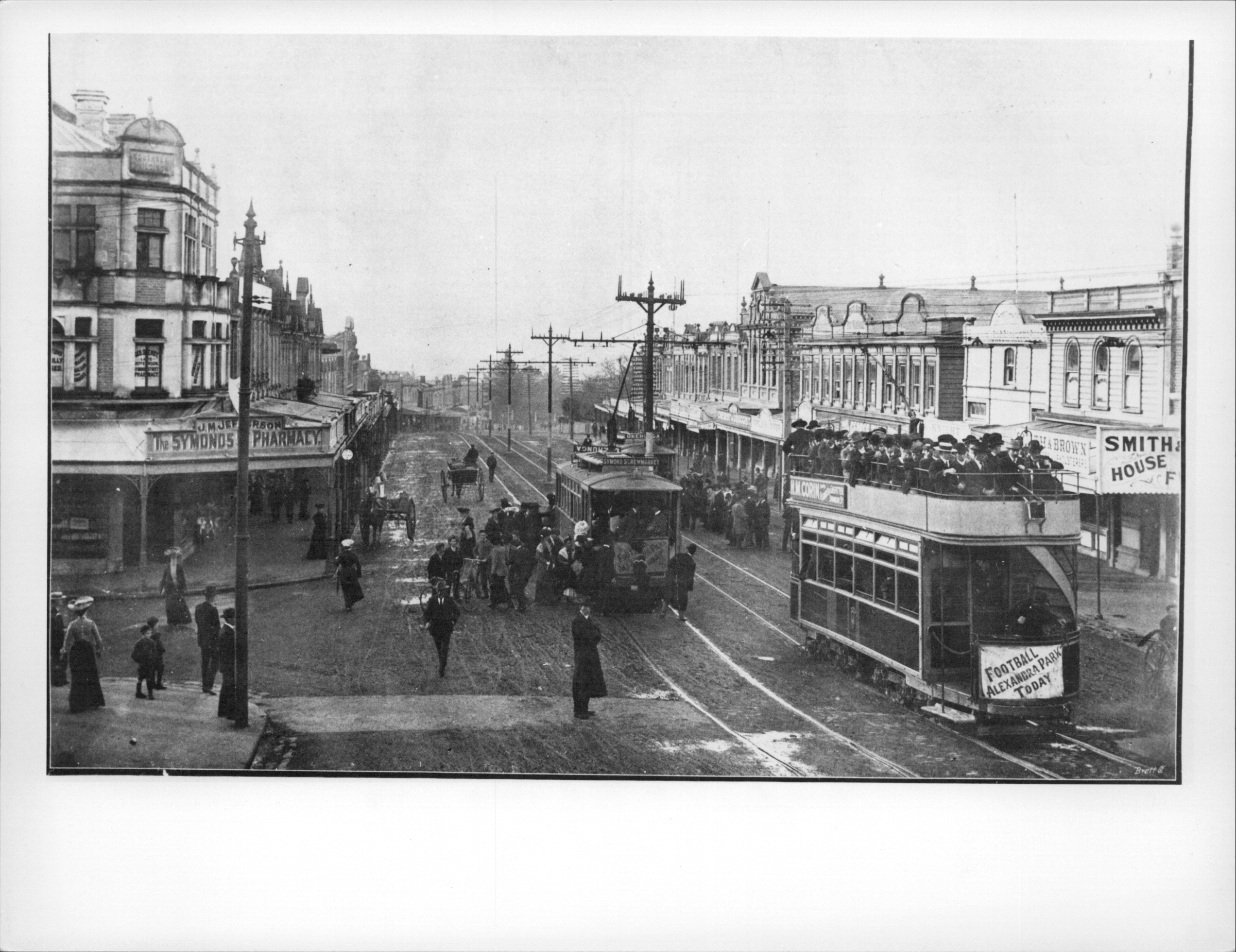
Trams on Upper Symonds Street in 1904.

Auckland was served by a network of traditional tramway tracks with horse-drawn trams (1884–1902) and electric trams (1902–1956). The original tram network was 72 kilometres (45 mi) in length at its fullest extent from the mid-1930s until the first closures in 1949.

=== Modern proposals ===
==== Initial proposals ====
In 2015 Steve Hawkins, Auckland Transport's Chief Engineer, said that the bus routes on Symonds Street and Fanshawe Street require as many as 150 buses each. The light rail study is considering replacing the bus routes on Dominion Road, Manukau Road, Mt Eden Road, Symonds Street and Queen St with light rail routes. All of these bus routes replaced routes on Auckland's former tram network.

Stuff quoted Auckland Transport officials who described how the study was considering the option of building light rail routes with dedicated right of way versus routes where rail vehicles shared the road with other vehicles, as with a traditional streetcar system. Officials projected that the maximum passenger capacity of a segregated light rail line would be 18,000 passengers per hour, while that of a street-running system would be 12,000 passengers per hour. This compares with a bus on a shared path shifting 2,500 people and a bus on a priority path's 6,000 people an hour.

In 2015 then Auckland mayor Len Brown pointed out that the city's ten-year plan did not include funding for building new light rail routes.

The Airport to Botany route, to be built as a busway instead of light rail. No other routes have been confirmed yet.

A line from the airport east to Botany Downs has also been proposed with a new interchange at Puhinui railway station, planned to be built in two stages, the first of which is said to be an early deliverable component of the Airport to Botany rapid transit line, planned to be operational by the end of 2020/early 2021. This encompasses a new at-grade bus/rail interchange and enhanced station. Buses will still use the existing local road (Bridge Street) to cross the railway line to/from Manukau, along with local traffic. The second phase provides a rapid transit overbridge across the railway line to provide a more direct and bespoke rapid transit connection. The new rapid transit link will integrate with the new interchange station on the overbridge. The first stage is estimated to cost $59 million to construct. The line will also go through Manukau railway station before ending in Botany.

==== 2017–2023 ====
On 26 April 2018, mayor Phil Goff and Transport Minister Phil Twyford announced the Auckland Transport Alignment Project 2018 with $NZ28 billion of investment in Auckland transport infrastructure over ten years, including the fast-tracking of light rail to Auckland International Airport.

On 9 May 2018, in a pre-Budget announcement, Twyford and Finance Minister Grant Robertson made the surprise announcement that work on two routes would commence immediately, with an open-tender process for funding, construction, and operation of the lines:

- A line from Wynyard Quarter along Queen Street with one route to Auckland Airport via Dominion Road.
- A second line, also travelling along Queen Street, then via Karangahape Road and Great North Road to Westgate via a Northwestern Motorway dedicated light-rail corridor, with extensions indicated to Kumeū and Huapai, running past the currently disused Kumeū and Huapai railway stations on the North Auckland Line. Passenger services on the Western Line do not currently operate north of Swanson and do not serve these stations.

In May 2018, it was announced that the New Zealand Superannuation Fund had expressed an interest in financing, designing, building and operating Auckland's light rail network, in a consortium with CDPQ Infra, a Canadian infrastructure company. The consortium was named NZ Infra.

By early 2019, the cost of the two lines had been estimated at $6 billion, with an underground alignment through Queen St under consideration.

In August 2019, Mayor Phil Goff announced that work on the light rail network might begin the following year. The same month, two delivery partners for the project were shortlisted; NZ Infra and NZ Transport Agency, but it was stated that a 2020 start date would be unlikely. By late 2019, two different types of technology were being considered by the New Zealand Ministry of Transport. The original proposal from the New Zealand Transport Agency consisted of surface level light rail; the other from NZ Super Fund explored fully grade-separated, driverless light metro technology, with an underground alignment through Queen St and elevated sections elsewhere, with fewer stations between the city centre and airport.

In May 2020, it was reported that the light rail project had been placed on hold due to the impact of the COVID-19 pandemic in New Zealand. In June, Twyford confirmed that the Ministry of Transport was still committed to the project, but as a fully grade-separated light metro line between the city and airport; stating that "Our policy is that light metro is the form of rapid transit that Auckland needs. We've decided very clearly that we need a rapid transit system that's not competing with pedestrians and other cars in the road corridor. A light metro system just like you see in London, New York, Tokyo, Paris, is actually faster and more efficient. It would allow you to get from Queen St to the Airport in 30 minutes as opposed to the 47 minutes that was projected for the old streetcar model Auckland Transport developed."

The ministry did not release the updated cost of the new light metro proposal, or any time frame for its construction. However, industry commentators estimated that the decision to use the metro mode would increase cost of the two lines from $6 billion to more than $20 billion, with a new design and construction period of 8 to 10 years beginning from 2021 at the earliest.

In January 2022, the New Zealand government confirmed it had endorsed a $14.6 billion "Tunnelled Light Rail" line from the city centre to the airport, featuring an underground line between the city centre and Mount Roskill, which would then emerge to the surface and continue to the airport via Māngere. In October 2022, Auckland Light Rail Limited was established to further work on the project. Minister for Transport Michael Wood indicated construction could begin in 2023 and last six to seven years.

==== Cancellation ====
Following the 2023 General Election, the incoming prime minister, Christopher Luxon, told media that his government would be cancelling the project "because it's a white elephant".

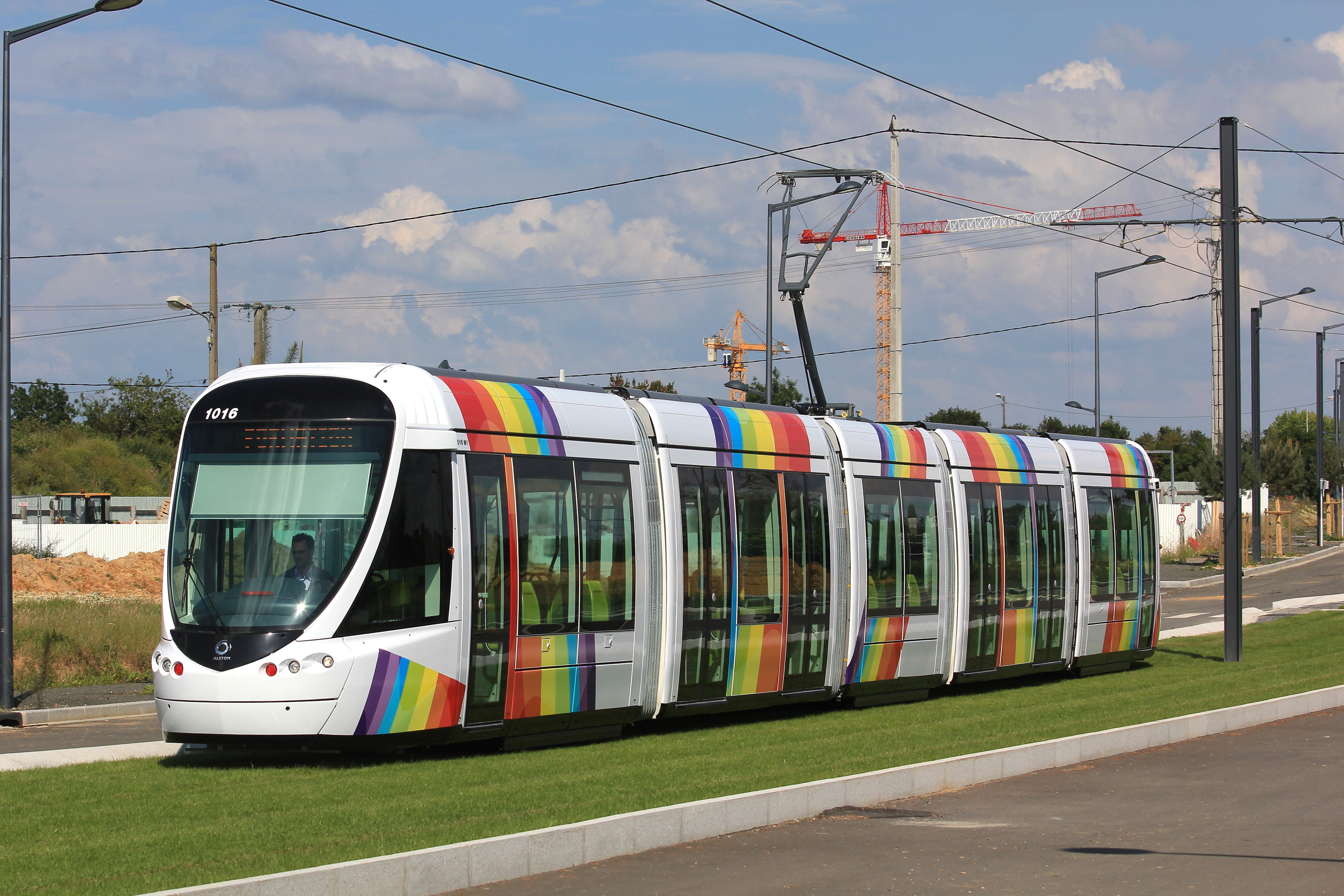
Angers light rail network

But Auckland mayor Wayne Brown contended that the project could be built at a fraction of the cost of previous options, citing overseas projects such as the light rail network in the French city of Angers which cost just $53 million per kilometre, against the $375 million which he described as being the current cheapest option for the route.

On 29 November 2023, under their 100-day plan, the National-led government undertook to stop central government work on the Auckland Light Rail project. However, Auckland Transport chief executive Dean Kimpton said light rail was still an option for the city – if above ground. Nevertheless, on 14 January 2024, Simeon Brown, Minister of Transport in the new National-led coalition government, instructed Auckland Light Rail Limited to immediately cease work on the project and take the necessary steps to wind up the company. Brown described the projected $15 to $29.2 billion cost of the Light Rail project as unsustainable. He also criticised the previous Labour government for spending NZ$228 million on the project over the past six years with little to show for it. Brown confirmed that the Government would continue work on the City Rail Link, which had been started the previous National Government.

A cabinet paper revealed that the disestablishment of the Ministry of Transport's work on the project was estimated to cost millions of dollars spent over six months and would involve the disposal of property and land, and settling obligations, coming after an alleged $228m had already been spent on the project without a metre of track laid.

The business case for the cancelled project was released in February 2024, showing that every dollar invested would have brought an economic benefit of $NZ2.40.

== City Centre to Māngere line proposal ==
The City Centre-Māngere line was planned to run from Wynyard Quarter to Auckland Airport; via the Auckland CBD, University of Auckland, Kingsland railway station, Wesley, Mount Roskill, Onehunga and Māngere. There would have been be a total of 18 stops with trains running every five minutes. While the line between Wynyard Quarter and Mount Roskill would have been tunnelled, the rest of the network would have been a surface line running alongside State Highway 20. As of 2025, Auckland Transport continues to include the corridor in its rapid transit plans, but lists City Centre-Māngere as "mode to be confirmed."

== See also ==
- Rail transport in New Zealand
- Trams in New Zealand
- Auckland Airport Line
- Public transport in Auckland
- Light rail in Wellington
