= Trams in Gisborne =

Former tram network in Gisborne, New Zealand

Gisborne Tramways
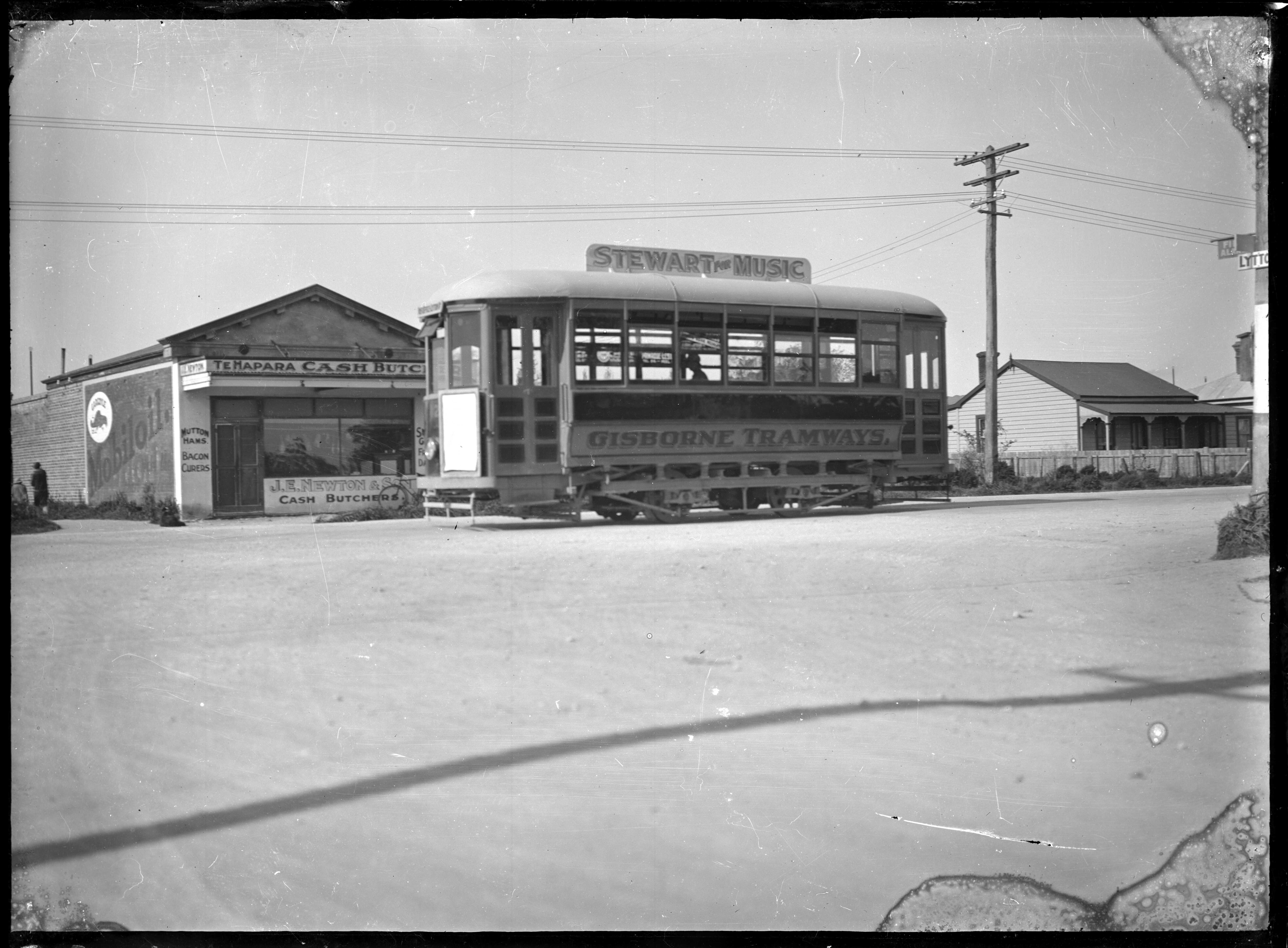

Overview
- Owner: Gisborne Borough Council
- Locale: Gisborne, New Zealand

Service
- Type: Tramway
- Operator: Gisborne Borough Council
- Depot: Carnarvon Street

History
- Opened: 16 April 1913
- Closed: 8 July 1929

The Gisborne Tramways were a tramway system in Gisborne, New Zealand, operated by the Gisborne Borough Council from 1913 to 1929. They were the only tramway in the country worked entirely by battery-electric cars, which carried Edison storage batteries instead of drawing current from overhead wires. At the opening it was reported to be the first storage battery tramway in the southern hemisphere, and such systems were then in use in only a few places. It was reported to have lost money heavily, and the last official run took place on 8 July 1929, after which council buses took over.

== Background ==
A tramway for Gisborne was being canvassed by early 1908, when a representative of the British Electric Traction Company visited the town. In December 1909 ratepayers authorised a loan of £175,000, £25,000 of it for trams; the scheme provided for ten cars and seven miles of track. The cars were at first to be fitted with petrol engines. By 1911 the council was instead considering storage battery cars, and it was noted that the substitution might technically depart from the proposals ratepayers had voted on.

The mayor, W. D. Lysnar, had gone to Britain to raise the loan, and his impressions of the battery system came from discussions with Edison and from the few places where it was then in use. He returned in December 1910 with a contract signed by the Edison Storage Battery Company and a guarantee from Edison. On 11 July 1911 the council decided to order two cars as a first instalment, with two more expected if they proved satisfactory. The councillors disputed the contract when the manufacturer sought a higher price after the Public Works Department required alterations to the design. The contract with the builder, dated 15 July 1911, covered two single-truck cars, each with 105 cells of Edison A8 battery.

== Construction and opening ==
Track-laying began in 1912. The first section ran from the post office along Gladstone Road to Roebuck Road, a little over a mile, with passing loops and a double line between Peel Street and the post office to allow for later extensions; the car barn was in Carnarvon Street. A Public Works Department inspector passed the cars as satisfactory in the week before opening.

The service was opened on 16 April 1913 by the mayor, William Pettie, who drove the first car along Gladstone Road to the post office and then declared it open at the car barn. He acknowledged that the council had taken a very great risk in starting with an entirely new system, and said it was hoped that the trams would not hang heavily on the town. Free rides were given to schoolchildren that afternoon.

== Routes ==
The system had two lines:

- One ran from the post office along Gladstone Road, past Peel Street, Carnarvon Street, to the end of the line at Roebuck Road. This was later extended to a new terminus at Lytton Road in Te Hapara.
- The other left the Gladstone Road line at Peel Street, running over the new river bridge across the Taruheru River, then via Ormond Road through Whataupoko to Mangapapa Road.

The two lines shared track, doubled from Peel Street, between that junction and the post office, which stood on the site now occupied by Heipipi (Endeavour Park). The post office, completed in 1903, was demolished in 1966 after earthquake damage.

== Operation ==
In the first eight weeks, running charges were reported as £300 against revenue of £350. Other towns studied the system. A consulting engineer for the Takapuna Tramway Company inspected it in May 1913 and judged it promising, noting that the cars were serving only the business centre, not the more profitable residential areas. The Palmerston North borough engineer visited in June 1913, and a Wanganui deputation in January 1914. The mayor of Timaru, having inquired into the system in 1911, declined to recommend it for his town. No other New Zealand tramway adopted it.

At home, enthusiasm was mixed. A councillor moved in November 1913 that the council consider supplementing the trams with a motor bus service, and letters to the press in 1914 complained that the cars ran up and down the main street while track and materials lay idle. By mid-1915 the cars' performance was in open dispute. The council sought advice from the Edison company's New Zealand representative and an American tramway engineer, who attributed the problems to imperfections in the cars' mechanical construction and electrical equipment, not the battery principle, and noted that the cars had been designed for wider-gauge American systems. The annual return reported in June 1916 showed receipts of £2,061 against working expenses of £2,187, before interest of £1,035 and a sinking fund of £130; 331,720 passengers were carried over 40,636 car miles.

A further loan of £30,000 was authorised in November 1915 for two more cars and an additional mile of track in Gladstone Road. The third car entered service in July 1917 and the fourth in May 1919. The track eventually ran along Gladstone Road to Lytton Road at Te Hapara, and along Ormond Road to the old borough boundary, the latter opening in 1923. The planned lines to the racecourse and Wainui Beach via Kaiti were never built and the second line to Ormond Road line stopped at Mangapapa Road, short of Mangapapa itself.

Images of the Gisborne trams
Showing an interior view of one of the new storage-battery cars of the Gisborne Electric Tram Service.

Showing the first Storage-Battery Electric Trams in Australasia at the inauguration of the new system at Gisborne, N.Z. April, 1913.

Crowds watching the first tram passing over the new bridge across the Taruheru River at Gisborne.

== Rolling stock ==
Car	Entered service	Notes
1–2	1913	Single-truck, 28 ft long with seating for 26 and standing room for 20, enclosed with one-man control, two 10 hp motors, weight 4 tons 15 cwt; each reportedly cost £2,250 landed and assembled, nearly £1,000 of that being customs duty.
3	July 1917	
4	May 1919	

== Closure ==
By the 1920s the tramway was reported to be losing heavily, with track and plant not maintained to a satisfactory standard for lack of funds and no renewal fund in place. On 21 April 1926 the council resolved that the system must be abandoned at an early date and invited private bus proprietors to apply to run services; an actuary's report put the loss falling on the council at £6,000 to £7,000 a year. The council then learned that it could not scrap the trams unilaterally. They operated under a special order in council granted in 1912, which would be revoked only if the governor was satisfied that ratepayers wanted this, and legal advice was that the council was obliged to continue the service under penalty for discontinuance. In August 1926 Lysnar, by then the local member of parliament, told the House that the battery system had proved a success despite severe usage, and that the desire to remove the trams was about buses being cheaper for the borough, not about the system.

A poll of ratepayers on 10 September 1926 favoured scrapping by a majority of 133, with only two-fifths of ratepayers voting; Lysnar travelled from Wellington to urge retention. The poll was set aside by a magistrate because a new Act changing the method of voting had come into force the day before. In October 1926 a commission of three experts appointed by the minister of public works investigated. Its report estimated the annual working loss at £2,670 once renewals were provided for, with £2,942 more for interest and sinking fund payable whether or not the trams were scrapped; it accepted as reasonable an engineer's estimate of £25,000 to renew the Gladstone Road track, though renewing one mile would suffice for the time being, and recommended consent to an order suspending the service.

A second poll on 12 November 1926, held under an opinion that only ratepayers could vote, again favoured scrapping, by 1,143 votes to 910. A fresh petition lodged on 1 December argued that all electors, not just ratepayers, should have voted, following a judge's ruling in the Takapuna tramway case. In January 1927 a councillor argued that the trams were covering their running expenses, with the tramway account £747 4s 11d in credit, and proposed that they be allowed to run until they wore out; the council adjourned the question. The magistrate held the petition over pending an expected appeal in the Takapuna case, which did not proceed, and in October 1927 declared the second poll invalid because it had been taken on the ratepayer franchise.

Meanwhile the council had taken over the fleet of a private bus operator in March 1927 after a legal action that went against it. In early May 1928, having received a report showing the trams had lost £2,077 in the previous year plus £2,647 interest, while the council's buses had made a profit of £269, the council resolved to apply for an order in council to discontinue the system and to seek a loan of £20,000 to buy buses. A poll on the proposal to seek authority to scrap was held on 29 June 1928, and the Ormond Road service passed to buses in July 1928. An order in council dissolving the service was gazetted in December 1928.

In the fortnight to 18 May 1929 the trams collected £123 in fares from 12,351 passengers, against £233 from 17,806 passengers on the buses. The last official run was on the afternoon of 8 July 1929. The four cars were lined up at the lower end of Gladstone Road with seven buses behind them, and the first tram was driven by the mayor, D. W. Coleman, with most of the councillors aboard. The cars ran from the Post Office end to the turn-off at Carnarvon Street, leaving ten minutes late because photographers were still at work. Crowds watched mostly in silence, and a party of schoolchildren cheered each car.

== Aftermath ==
The cars were stored on a spur in Carnarvon Street, south of the car barn, to await sale. The barn became a repair and storage depot for the council's buses. By June 1930 one car had been sold and moved to Kahutia Street to serve as a contractor's office, fetching a small fraction of its insured value; the council had three others it was willing to dispose of cheaply, though demand was limited. The tracks initially remained in Gladstone and Ormond Roads, as did tramway loans of £57,554, repayable in 1940 and 1946, against a sinking fund of £6,200. It was reported in 1970 that the loan for the system had finally been paid off, a delay attributed to the method of raising and repaying loans earlier in the century.

== See also ==
- Trams in New Zealand
