= Auckland Airport Line =

Heavy rail line

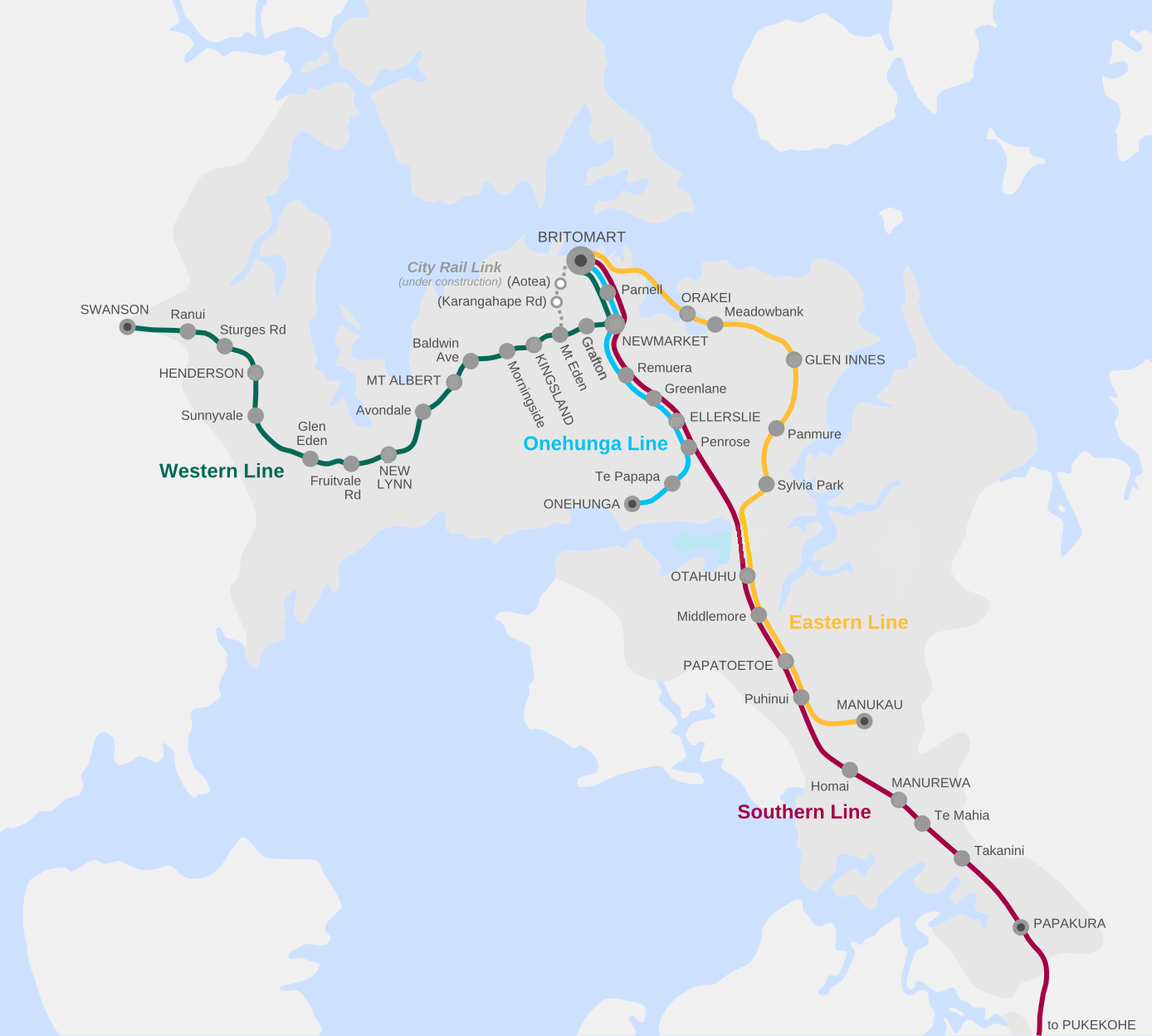
Current lines and active projects on the Auckland rail network as of November 2026. The Onehunga Branch is the section of the Onehunga Line between Penrose and Onehunga

The Auckland Airport Line is a proposed heavy rail line in Auckland, New Zealand, that would link Auckland Airport with the Auckland central business district via central isthmus suburbs.

From 2017, a light rail connection via a new City Centre–Māngere Line has been preferred. However, following the 2023 general election, this proposal was cancelled.

== History ==
The main barrier to a rail link was the crossing of the Manukau Harbour between Onehunga and the suburb Māngere Bridge. Transit New Zealand announced in 2007 that a new motorway bridge duplicating, and alongside, the existing 1983 Māngere Bridge would be designed to accommodate a rail link. In September 2007, Auckland Regional Transport Authority announced that it was willing to pay Transit $2.5 million to "future-proof" the duplication of the bridge in order "to accommodate a passenger rail connection".

The duplication of the bridge was completed in 2010. The successor to Transit New Zealand, NZ Transport Agency, provided for a rail corridor near the motorway as far as Walmsley Road. The proposed heavy rail line was the most popular with the public of the three Auckland rail proposals of Mayor Len Brown, although the number of trains would be limited without the City Rail Link to Britomart Transport Centre. Brown had promised a rail link to the Airport during his 2010 election campaign as part of a package of measures to double public transport patronage within 15 years.

The official name for the airport link in the Long-term Plan 2012–2022 is the South Western Airport Multi Modal Corridor Project.

The Airport rail link planning study commenced in 2010.

The Auckland Airport company asked for a decision by mid-2016 whether a rail or bus station would be needed at the airport, as it was planning a new domestic terminal, with construction to start in 2021.

Escalating costs (estimated at $1.63b) for the heavy rail line to the Airport prompted some to raise the possibility of the route being served by light rail between Onehunga and the airport as an alternative to heavy rail. This option would make use of existing infrastructure where possible to reduce expenses and would involve an interchange with the existing heavy rail services at Onehunga.

The line was initially conceived as an extension of the Onehunga Branch line over the Māngere Bridge and via the suburbs of Māngere Bridge and Māngere. However the 2016 study identified this as an expensive option:

- the need to double-track the branch line for high train frequencies
- the high cost of grade-separating and closing level crossings on the branch line versus the less expensive but much less safe option of no grade-separation with barriers and pedestrian gates
- the extent of viaducts and tunnelling required for an underground terminus under the airport terminal, with a decision needing to be made in time for the airport to begin construction of a new domestic terminal

These made an extension of Auckland's heavy rail network an expensive option, and require airport trains to run via the already-congested tracks and junctions of the inner Southern Line.

The indicative business case includes a preferred heavy rail option with four new stations, at Māngere Bridge, Māngere Town Centre, Airport Business District and the Airport Terminal, though the general arrangement plans indicate a fifth station at Favona, between the two Māngere stations.

=== Proposed heavy rail alignment ===
Onehunga to Airport proposal 2016

The 2016 proposed alignment of the line shows a duplicated railway in a trench from Penrose Junction (notably without a new Penrose station), passing under an elevated O'Rorke Road and surface-level Maurice Road, with a new Te Papapa island platform in a trench under Mays Road, Captain Springs Road being severed and the line passing under Church Street, then returning to ground level at a severed Alfred Street, Victoria Street and Spring Street (a new Onehunga island platform between these latter two). Galway Street would be permanently closed and the line ramps uphill around the tight curve to head south, cutting off the present Onehunga station, and passing over the top of the flattened Neilson Street bridge. The line would remain elevated over a proposed Galway Street extension, then pass underneath the new and old Māngere bridges about 200 metres ahead of their southern abutments, over Mahunga Drive to the first new elevated station of Māngere Bridge. From there the alignment continues south, along the western edge of the Southwestern Motorway, with the at-grade Favona station north of Walmsley Road. Further along, it uses a bridge to transition to the median of the Auckland Airport motorway with an elevated island platform for Māngere Town Centre west of the New Bader Drive bridge, then continuing as a bridge in the median beyond Montgomerie Road until Westney Road then pointing south, crossing over the southbound carriageway and across Verissimo Drive. After this the line drops to a tunnelled Airport Business District station, with the island platform below John Goulter Drive Extension, before a final curve west below Tom Pearce Drive then George Bolt Memorial Drive to finish at a tunnelled Airport Terminal island platform outside Ray Emery Drive. A proposed station at Ascot, between Māngere Town Centre and Airport Business District, was noted as being difficult to provide on the ramp down from the elevated median to below the second airport runway alignment.

The heavy rail option would result in a journey time of 39 minutes from the airport to Britomart Transport Centre in Auckland CBD, at an estimated cost of NZ$2.2 billion. The draft indicative business case for the "high cost" (grade-separated) design showed a planned service every 10 minutes, with benefits rated at $625M and costs of $1,946M (at a 6% discount rate) for Benefit–cost ratios (BCR) of between 0.23 and 0.48, depending on the discount rates used, but excluding Wider Economic Benefits (WEBs). These WEBs were separately shown to be in the order of $106M.

=== Proposed combined heavy rail and BRT design ===
An alternative hybrid rail plus BRT option saw the present Onehunga station site retained, with a bus terminal constructed over the top. Buses would operate over the outer lanes of the Māngere Bridge, then the west and north sides of SH20/SH20a until Kirkbride Road, then crossing to the median. The whole road, including the BRT alignment, was to be rerouted beyond Westney Road to avoid most of the second runway alignment, with an Airport Business District station running east–west at the intersection of Tom Pearce Drive and George Bolt Memorial Drive, and a terminating balloon loop for buses about 600 metres north of the main airport buildings.

=== Light rail ===
The choice of mode and alignment for the Airport Line remained contentious. In the 2017 general election campaign, promises of light rail to the airport were made by the Labour Party, which established the Sixth Labour Government with a coalition agreement. One coalition partner, the Green Party, also favoured light rail although the other partner, New Zealand First, favoured the earlier heavy rail scheme. The previous (National Party) government said that light rail would be eventually required, but would not happen for thirty years.

On 28 January 2022, Transport Minister Michael Wood announced that the New Zealand Government has approved a NZ$14.6 billion project to establish a partially tunnelled light rail network between Auckland Airport and the Wynyard Quarter via the Auckland CBD. While the Green Party's Ricardo Menéndez welcomed the planned rail link, the ACT Party's transport spokesperson Simon Court claimed the project would be wasteful in terms of tax revenue.

Following the 2023 general election, the incoming Prime Minister, Christopher Luxon, told media that his government would be cancelling the project "because it's a white elephant".

The business case for the cancelled project was released in February 2024, showing that every dollar invested would have brought an economic benefit of NZ$2.40.
