= Auckland Tram Number 304 =

Number 304 was one of the Auckland, New Zealand, Freight/Works trams which operated from 1913 until 1957. It was built in the Ponsonby Depot and commissioned on 1 August 1913. 304 was designed to carry rails for reconstruction and construction of the Auckland Tramway network and was perhaps one of the most unique trams in service in New Zealand.

During peace celebrations following World War I, in 1919, No. 304 carried a brass band up and down Queen Street.

10 December 1956 was number 304's last journey into Central Auckland where it removed the remains of a damaged safety zone. It was the last tram to move under power on the original tram system in 1957, towing tram 248 now at Museum of Transport & Technology.

Number 304's Blackwell trolley standard which the trolley pole's were attached to were removed in 1957. They were later sent to the Museum of Transport & Technology in Auckland where they were fitted to two trams when undergoing restoration (numbers 44 & 11). No. 304's crane controller is preserved at the Museum of Transport & Technology.

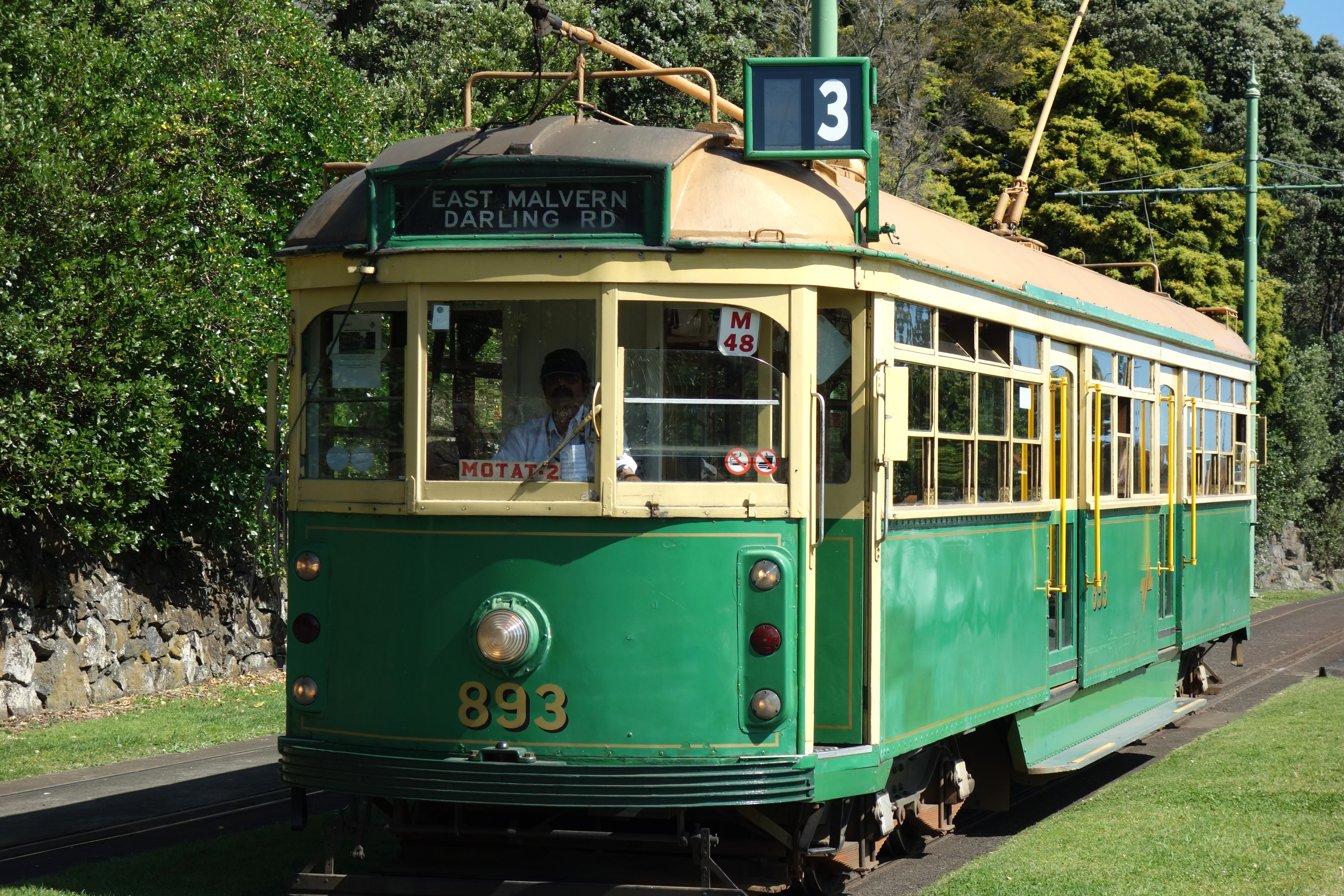
Tram 893, similar to the 304 tram.

== No. 304 in the early 1900s ==
Number 304 entered service in 1913. The New Zealand Herald stated "she is a travelling crane which will easily accommodate nine lengths of rail. It would take three carts to handle such a load". In 1917, a Ponsonby tram ran off the lines on the corner of Queen and Trafalgar Streets. No. 304 was sent to assist.

== Primary use ==
No.304 was especially constructed for the use of moving full length tram track. Imported tram track was shipped from the United Kingdom and taken to a stub track on Quay Street around the eastern corner from Queen Street where it was craned aboard 304, which had especially dished front aprons so over-length rails could be carried. The rails would then be taken to the Permanent Way Department of the Auckland Electric Tramway Company Limited, later the Auckland City Corporation Tramways and finally Auckland Transport Board, where the rail was stored and bent prior to being relocated by 304 to wherever new rail was being laid or repairs or track replacement was required.

== Fate ==
On 5 July 1957, No. 304 was withdrawn from service after towing dismantled old Auckland tram bodies around the Royal Oak Workshops that were left after the closure of the Auckland tramways in December 1956. Once 304 had towed the last tram to the gallows (used to raise old tram bodies to enable transport to their new homes) it was sent back to the truckshop. Graham Stewart (author of many New Zealand tram and history books) had written in chalk on the front aprons "THE END". 304 was sold to a farmer. 304 left the Royal Oak Workshops on 5 September 1957 by Elliot (Te Kopuru Transport). The chassis remnants of 304 were recovered in the 2010s and are privately preserved.

== Detailed Information ==
Number 304 had Brush model D trucks, canopies over both motorman's cabins with glass fronts, Self Lapping Motorman brake valves for ease of use by Workshop crews. With a 30cwt (1.5 tonne) jib-crane at one end.
