= Purewa railway station =

Defunct railway station in Auckland, New Zealand

Purewa
- Purewa railway station, c. 1930-1947

General information
- Location: New Zealand
- Line: North Island Main Trunk

History
- Opened: 11 May 1930
- Closed: 16 April 1947
Location

Purewa railway station was a station on the North Island Main Trunk line (NIMT) in Auckland, New Zealand. It was located between Glen Innes station and Ōrākei station.

== History ==
The station was constructed, along with several others, in 1929 on the route of the Westfield Deviation, which was being built to divert the Auckland–Westfield section of the NIMT via a flatter, faster eastern route to link up with the original tracks at Westfield Junction. It was closed on 16 April 1947.

== See also ==
List of Auckland railway stations
