= Manukau bus station =

Bus station in Auckland, New Zealand

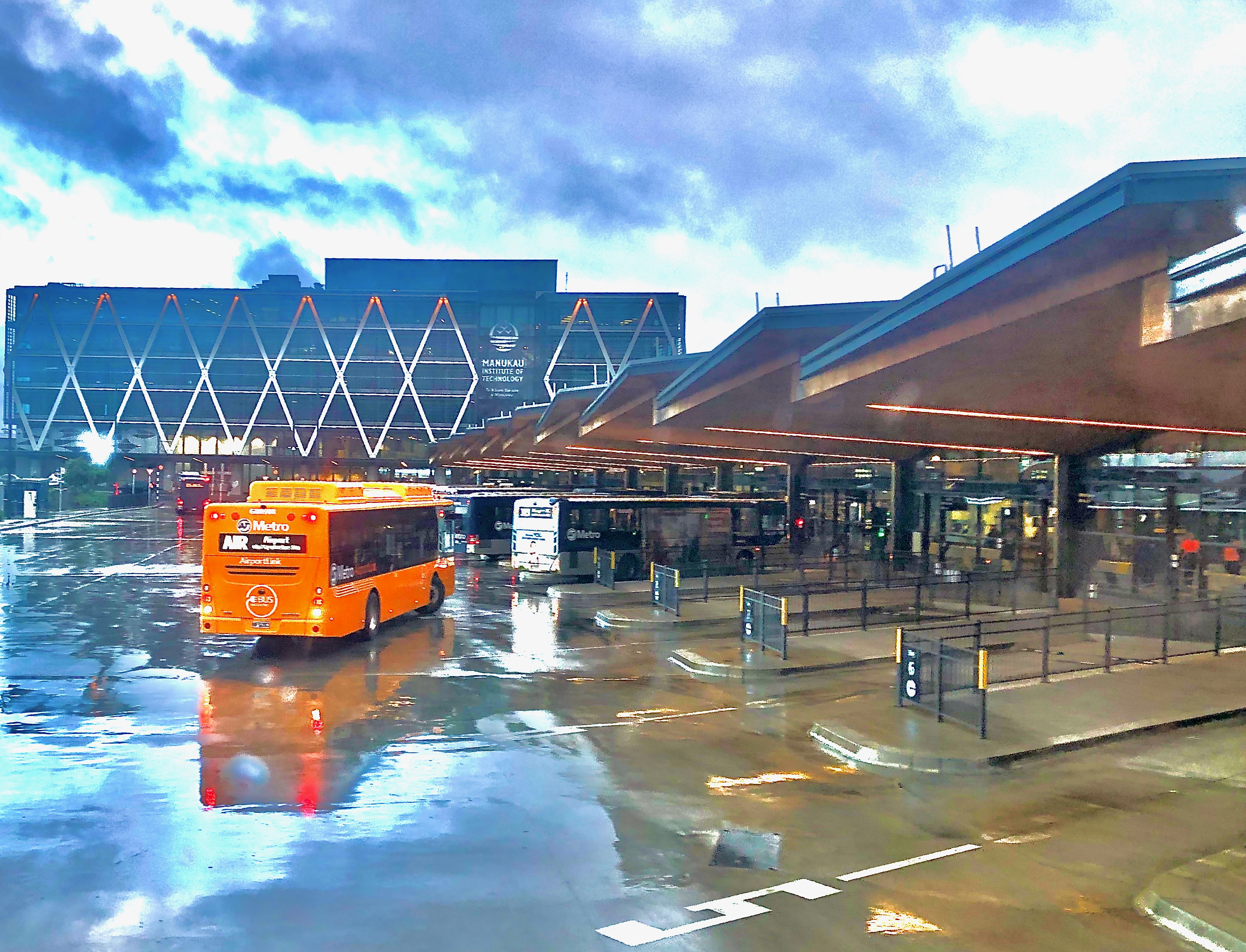
- The sawtooth bus bays and reversing area of the station. The Manukau Institute of Technology can be seen in the background, below which is the connecting train station

General information
- Location: 12 Putney Way, Manukau City Centre, Auckland New Zealand; Auckland; New Zealand
- Coordinates: 36°59′36.94″S 174°52′43.44″E
- System: Bus Station
- Owner: Auckland Transport
- Operator: AT Metro, InterCity
- Bus routes: 33, 35, 36, 39, 313, 325, 352, 353, 355, 362, 365, 366, AirportLink
- Bus stands: 23
- Connections: Manukau railway station

Construction
- Platform levels: 1
- Parking: No
- Cycle facilities: Yes; at adjacent train station
- Accessible: Yes
- Architect: Beca Architects, Cox Architecture

Other information
- Fare zone: Northern Manukau/Southern Manukau (overlap)

History
- Opened: April 7, 2018; 8 years ago
Location

Manukau bus station is a bus station in Auckland, New Zealand, located in Manukau City Centre. The station is an important transport hub for South Auckland, serving as an interchange between bus and train services through connections to the adjacent Manukau Train Station. It is also one of the newest transit stations on the AT Metro network - having opened in 2018 - and is prominent for its unique design which has received architectural accolades.

== History ==
The station was first proposed in 2015 as part of the implementation of the new bus network for South Auckland, forming a transport hub with the adjacent Manukau railway station. This was to make it easier for bus passengers to transfer to train services as an alternative to long bus trips into the central city. It was also intended to provide better connections between bus services and serve as a "gateway" to South Auckland and Auckland Airport. At the time, it was expected to cost $26 million with a completion date in late 2017. Construction began on 12 February 2016 with the construction jointly funded by the New Zealand Transport Agency and Auckland Council.

The station was officially opened on 7 April 2018 in a ceremony attended by Auckland Mayor Phil Goff and Transport Minister Phil Twyford. The project cost $50 million in total for both the land and construction costs (individually $37 million).

== Structure and facilities ==
=== Bus facilities ===
The station has 21 sawtooth bays (similar in design to bus stations in the New Zealand cities of Hamilton and Christchurch as well as in the Hamburg Central Bus Station in Germany) for buses with another two bus stops parallel to the station, on nearby Davies Avenue, which are intended for extra capacity. Auckland Transport justified the sawtooth design as necessary for maximising the use of space to accommodate up to 15 different bus routes at the station. This is due to the station being a terminus for many routes, which typically require layover time between services. The sawtooth design means that additional layover facilities are not required, with the buses waiting in the bays while transitioning between services. Buses reverse out of the sawtooth bays when departing the station in a reversing area that is segregated from the entry and exit lanes as well as passenger areas.

=== Bicycle facilities ===
Bicycle parking facilities were not included in the initial design of the station but are being considered for future addition. AT noted that there are already existing parking facilities in adjacent areas (including at the train station) that are underutilized, therefore there isn't a high level of necessity for parking facilities directly in the station building.

=== Retail ===
As of 2026, there were four food retailers integrated into the station: Viet Bites, U-Sushi, Breaktime Convenience and the newly-opened Indian Kiwi Restaurant (formerly Brew'd Hawt).

=== Architecture ===
==== Awards ====
| Year | Organisation | Award | Result |
|---|---|---|---|
| 2018 | New Zealand Institute of Architects - Auckland Awards | Public and Institutional Spaces/Built Environments - over $10 million | Won |
| 2018 | World Architecture Festival | Transport | Nominated |

== Services ==
=== AT Metro ===
| Platform | | Route | Destinations |
|---|---|---|---|
| Main station bays | 6 | 36 | Papatoetoe Station, Māngere Town Centre, Onehunga Transport Centre |
| Main station bays | 8 | AIR (Airport Link) | Puhinui, Airport |
| Main station bays | 9 | 313 | Papatoetoe, Māngere Town Centre |
| Main station bays | 10 | 325 | Clover Park, Chapel Downs, Bairds Road, Ōtara, Ōtāhuhu Station, Māngere Town Centre |
| Main station bays | 11 | School services | |
| Main station bays | 12 | 35 | Chapel Road, Ormiston, Botany Town Centre |
| Main station bays | 13 | 355 | Ormiston, Mission Heights, Middlefield Drive, Kilkenny Drive, Botany Town Centre |
| Main station bays | 14 | 353 | Preston Road, Harris Road, Botany Town Centre |
| Main station bays | 15 | 352 | East Tamaki, Highbrook, Panmure |
| Main station bays | 16 | 366 | Everglade Drive, The Gardens, Manurewa Interchange |
| Main station bays | 17 | 362 | Great South Road, Manurewa Interchange, Weymouth |
| Main station bays | 18 | 365 | Manurewa Interchange, Randwick Park, Papakura Station |
| Parallel stops | A | 33 | Great South Road, Hunters Corner, Ōtāhuhu Station |
| Parallel stops | A | 39 | Tui Road, Ōtara MIT |
| Parallel stops | B | 33 | Great South Road, Manurewa Interchange, Papakura Station |
| Parallel stops | B | 39 | Browns Road, Clendon Park, Mahia Road, Manurewa Interchange |

=== Intercity ===
The station is served by Intercity bus services on platforms 1-7 excluding platform 6 that served Bus 36.
