= Meadowbank railway station, Auckland =

Train station in New Zealand

Meadowbank
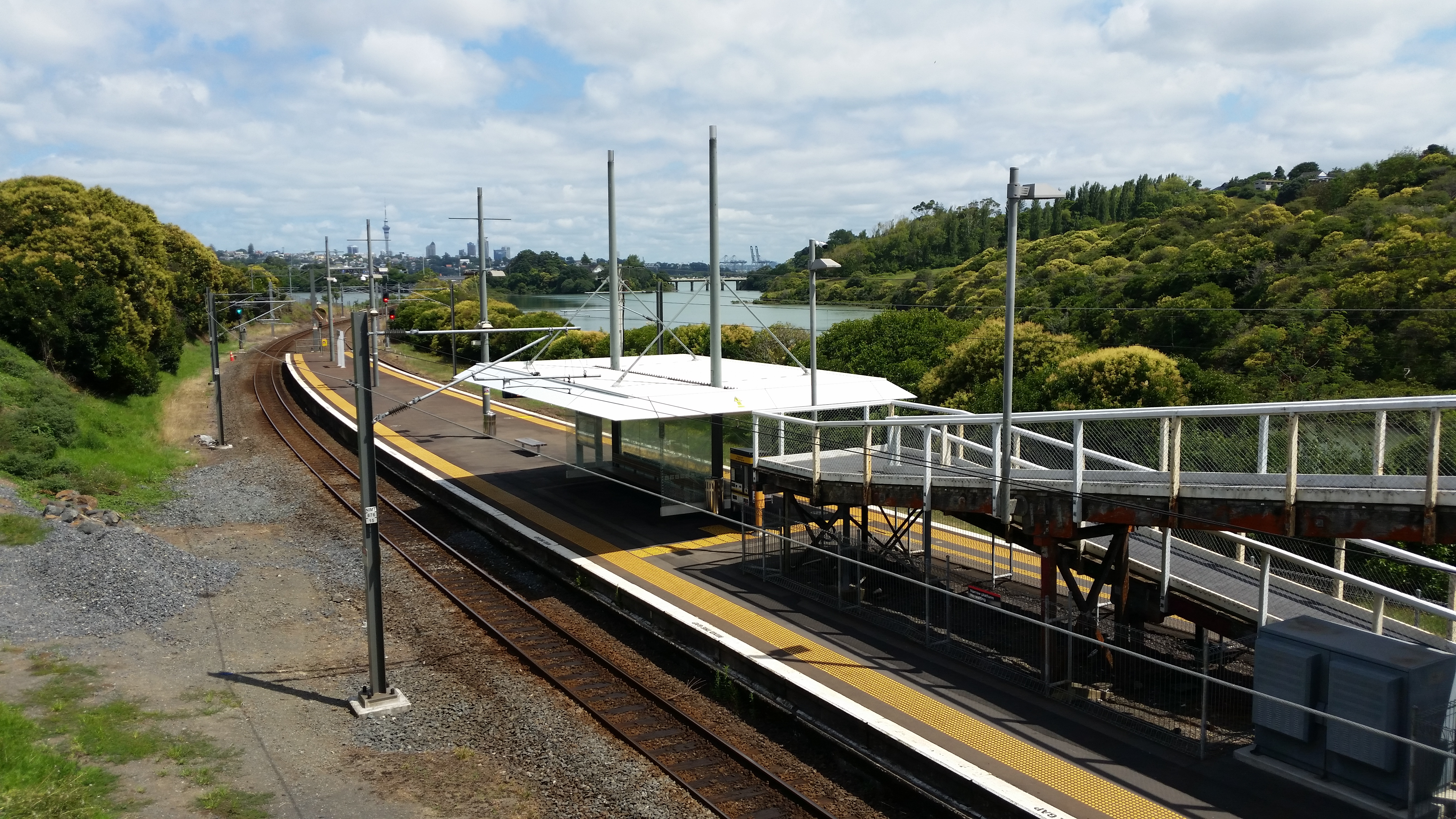
- The station in January 2018, seen from the pedestrian footbridge, looking toward Auckland CBD

General information
- Location: Meadowbank, Auckland; New Zealand
- Coordinates: 36.866301°S 174.820762°E
- System: Auckland Transport Urban rail
- Owner: KiwiRail (track and platforms); Auckland Transport (buildings)
- Operator: Auckland One Rail
- Line: North Island Main Trunk
- Distance: 676.26 km (420.21 mi) from Wellington
- Platforms: Island platform (P1 & P2)
- Tracks: Mainline (2)

Construction
- Parking: Yes
- Cycle facilities: Yes
- Accessible: Yes

Other information
- Fare zone: Isthmus

History
- Opened: 21 July 1947
- Electrified: 15 September 2014

Passengers
- CY 2018: 329,390

Services
Preceding station	Auckland Transport (Auckland One Rail)	Following station
Ōrākei towards Swanson	East West Line	Glen Innes towards Manukau
Location

Meadowbank railway station is located on the North Island Main Trunk line in New Zealand. East West line services of the Auckland railway network are the only services that regularly stop at the station. It has an island platform layout and can be reached by an overbridge at the corner of Purewa Road and Manapau Street where there is a carpark.

== History ==
The station opened on 21 July 1947, replacing the Purewa railway station which was located next to the Purewa Cemetery.

The station was temporarily closed between March 2023 and January 2024 due to Stage 2 of the Rail Network Rebuild. The Eastern Line was temporarily closed between Ōtāhuhu and Britomart for major track renewal work and to prepare the Eastern Line for the opening of the City Rail Link.

== Services ==
Auckland One Rail, on behalf of Auckland Transport, operates East West Line suburban services between Swanson and Manukau via Meadowbank.

Bus route 782 serves Meadowbank station.

Meadowbank station is served by Rail Bus Meadowbank (RBM) rather than Rail Bus East (RBE) during rail closures due to its location.

== See also ==
- List of Auckland railway stations
