= Manukau Station =

Manukau Station may refer to:

- Manukau bus station
- Manukau railway station
