= Middlemore railway station =

Train station in Auckland, New Zealand

Middlemore
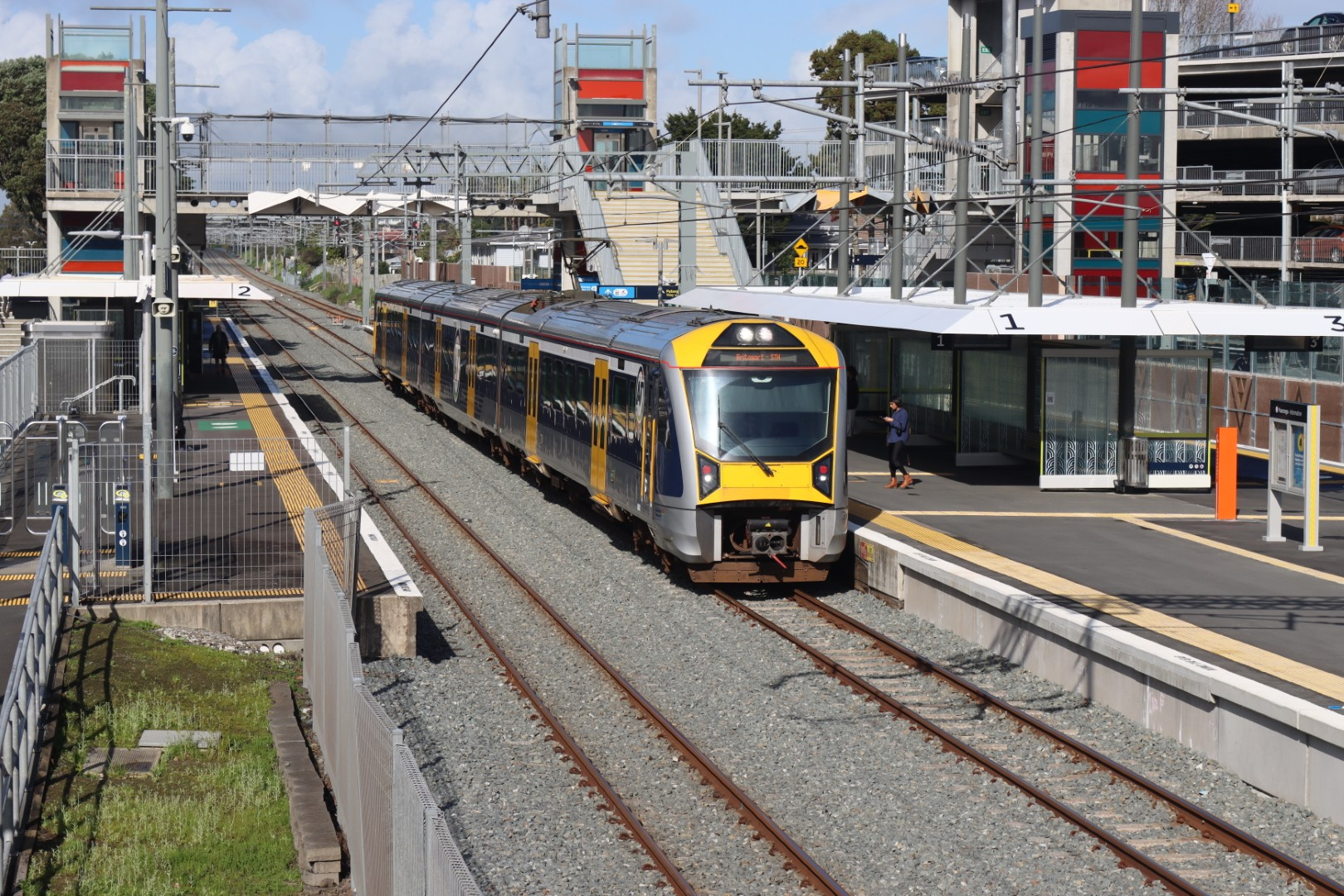
- Middlemore railway station looking from the bridge at the northern end

General information
- Location: Middlemore, Auckland; New Zealand
- Coordinates: 36°57.8′S 174°50.3′E
- System: Auckland Transport Urban rail
- Owner: KiwiRail (track and platforms); Auckland Transport (buildings)
- Operator: Auckland One Rail
- Line: North Island Main Trunk
- Distance: 662.28 km (411.52 mi) from Wellington
- Platforms: Island platform (P1 & P3); Side platform (P2)
- Tracks: Mainline (3)

Construction
- Parking: No
- Cycle facilities: Yes
- Accessible: Yes (Lifts)

Other information
- Fare zone: Northern Manukau

History
- Opened: 20 July 1947
- Electrified: April 2014

Passengers
- 2011: 3,055 passengers/weekday

Services
Preceding station	Auckland Transport (Auckland One Rail)	Following station
Ōtāhuhu towards Swanson	East West Line	Papatoetoe towards Manukau
Papatoetoe towards Pukekohe	South City Line	Ōtāhuhu towards Newmarket

Adjacent stations
Preceding station	KiwiRail	Following station
Mangere; Closed 2011	North Island Main Trunk	Papatoetoe
Location

Middlemore railway station is on the South City line and East West line of the Auckland railway network in New Zealand. The station consists of an island platform and a side platform connected by two pedestrian overbridges. Access to the station is via Hospital Road: it is next to Middlemore Hospital.

== History ==
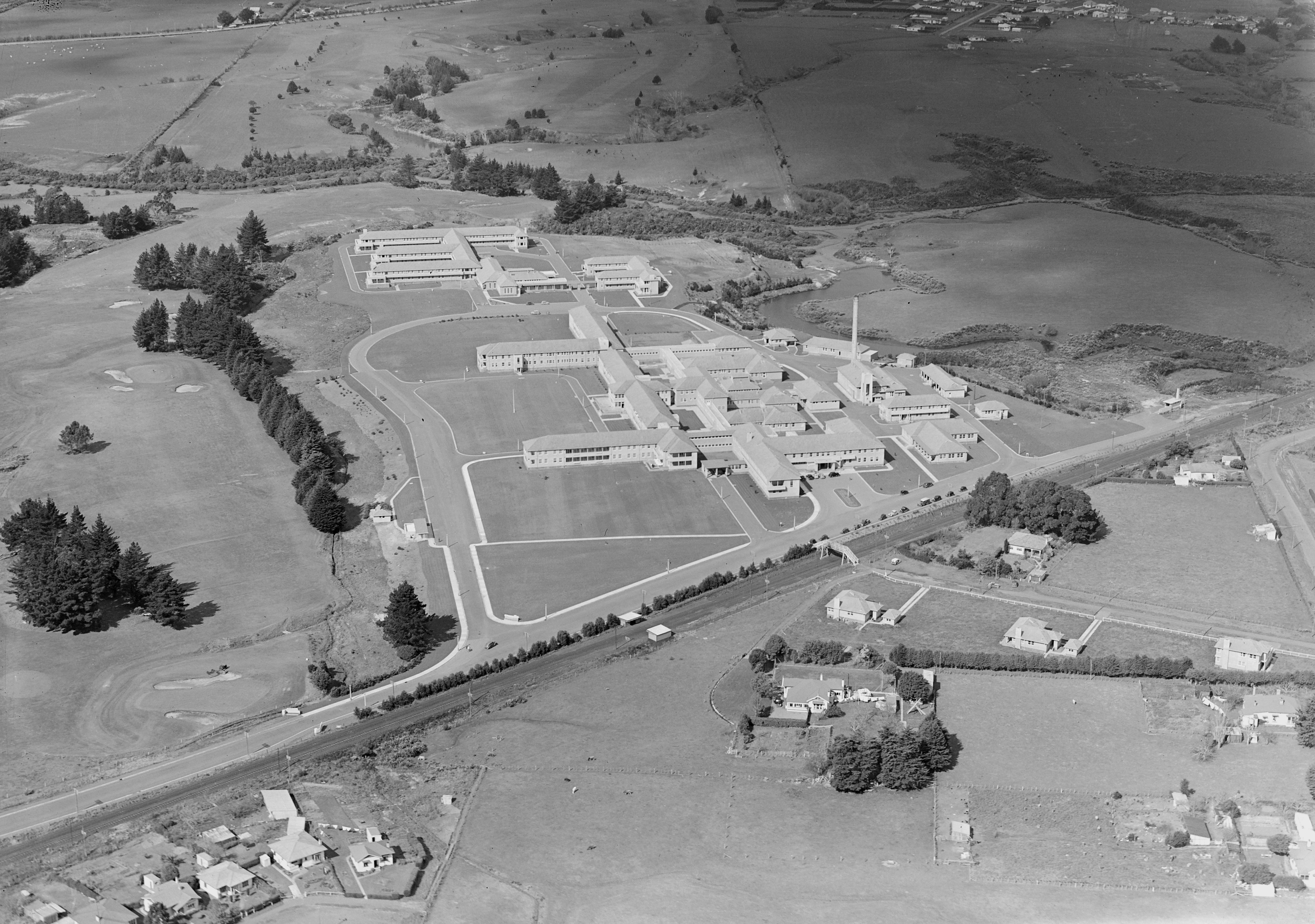
Middlemore hospital and railway station, 16 September 1947

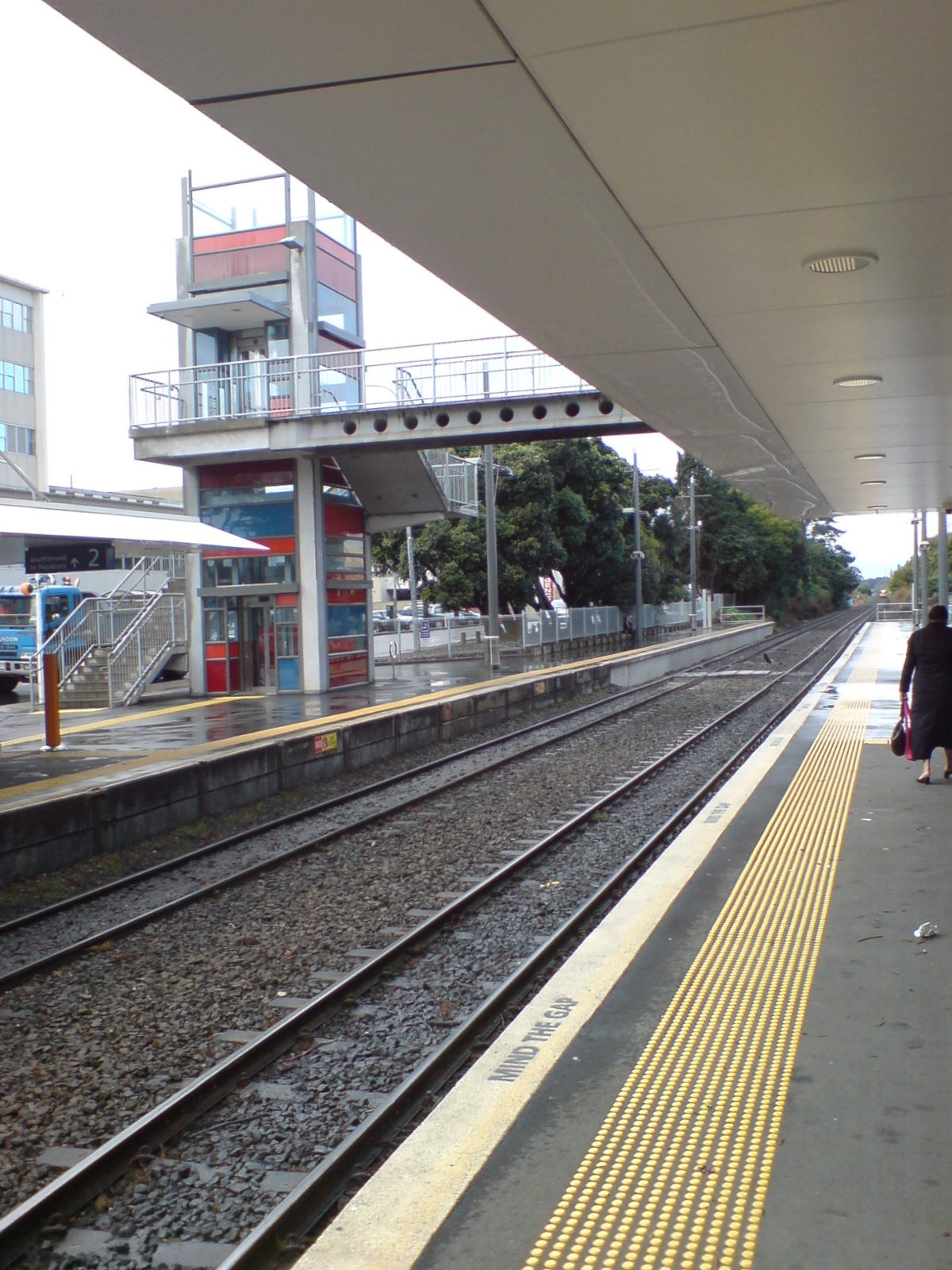
Middlemore Station in 2010 from platform level.

The North Island Main Trunk line through South Auckland was opened on 20 May 1875, as part of the Auckland and Mercer Railway, built by Brogden & Co, who extended it from Penrose. Duplication of the tracks was completed in December 1927.

In 1943, during World War II, construction commenced on a 300-bed hospital in Ōtāhuhu. It was built to accommodate sick and injured servicemen from the war in the Pacific and known as the Ōtāhuhu Military Hospital. After the war in the Pacific ended it became a civilian hospital, administered by the Auckland Hospital Board. The board decided in 1944 that the hospital would be known as Middlemore Hospital, the name of the Thompson family farm close to where the hospital was built, referencing a family member from the 18th Century.

Initially known as Middlemore Hospital Stop, Middlemore Station opened in July 1947, shortly after the hospital opened.

In September 2007, Counties Manukau District Health Board, ARTNL and ARTA opened a new railway footbridge and staff walkway at the station. The footbridge provides safer access to Middlemore Hospital from the staff carpark.

As part of the 2007 New Zealand budget it was announced that the station would be electrified. By January 2014 wires had been installed. In July 2015 electric trains began operating all passenger services.

In 2023, KiwiRail commenced an upgrade at Middlemore station. The station upgrade included building a new third platform to service the third main line. As part of the third platform construction, Platform 1 was converted from a side platform into an island platform. The upgrade was completed in 2025.

== Services ==
Auckland One Rail, on behalf of Auckland Transport, operates East West line and South City line services.

== See also ==
- List of Auckland railway stations
