= List of Auckland railway stations =

Comprehensive list of railway stations operated by Auckland Transport

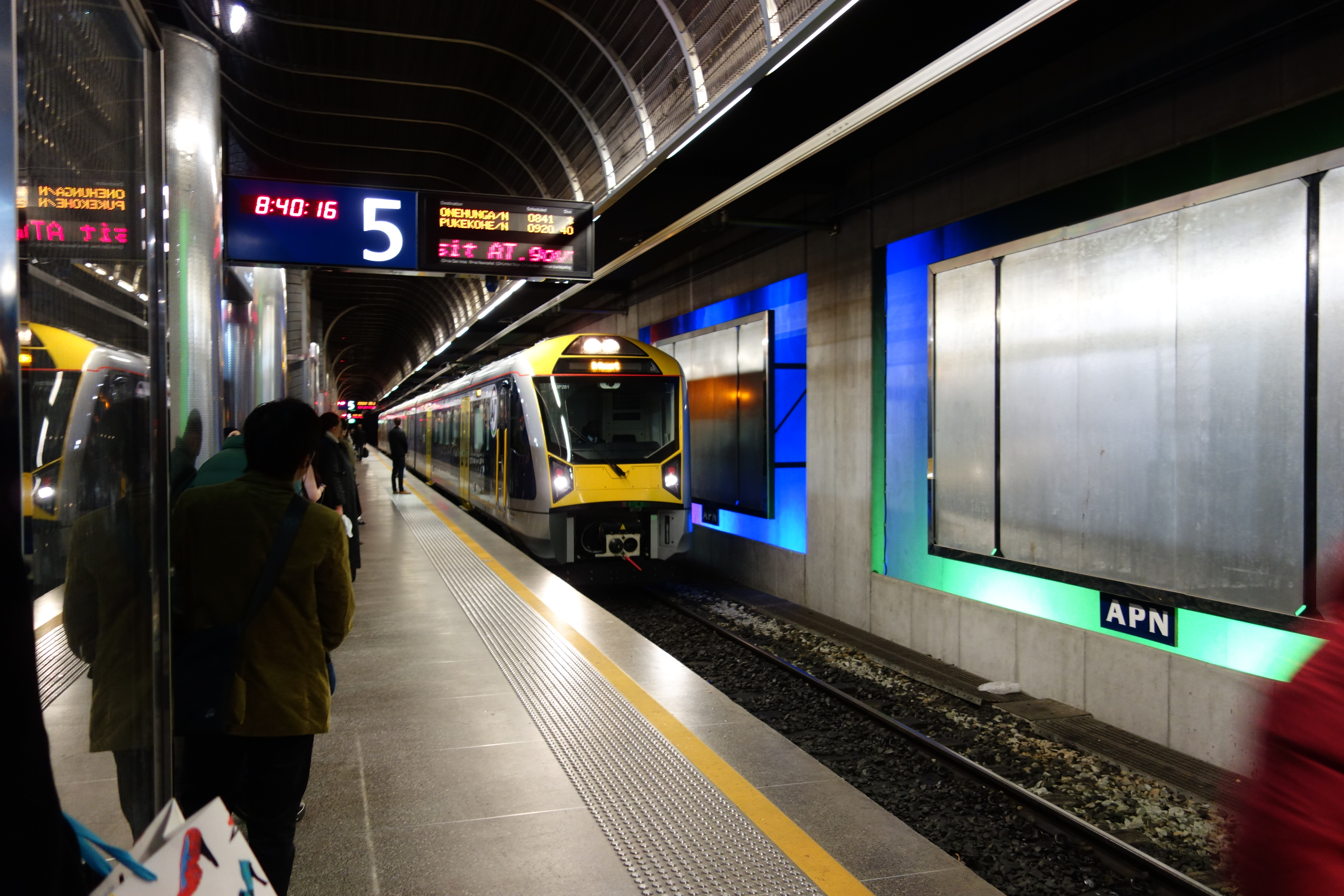
Platform at Waitematā, Auckland's largest railway station

This is a list of the railway stations in the public transport network of Auckland. It includes closed and planned stations. Auckland has nine fare zones, with some zone overlap areas. The routes shown pass into and out of central, western, eastern, and southern zones.

== Ownership and operation ==
Station platforms on the Auckland suburban network are owned by KiwiRail, who are responsible for building stations. Structures on the platforms (station buildings, shelters, lights, signage etc.) are owned by Auckland Transport, who are responsible for the operation and maintenance of stations.

Waitematā Station, Newmarket Railway Station and New Lynn Transport Centre are owned and managed by Auckland Transport.

Ticket office and platform staff, as well as train operating staff, are employed by Auckland One Rail.

Train services using stations in Auckland include suburban trains, which are owned by Auckland Transport and operated by Auckland One Rail, as well as the Northern Explorer long-distance train to Wellington and Te Huia train to Hamilton, both operated by KiwiRail.

== Network ==
=== South City line ===
Name	Served by	Opened	Closed	Notes
Newmarket^{H}	Auckland Transport	20 December 1873	–	
Parnell	Auckland Transport	12 March 2017	–	
Waitematā^{H}	Auckland Transport	7 July 2003	–	
Te Waihorotiu^{H}	Auckland Transport	13 September 2026	–	
Karanga-a-Hape^{H}	Auckland Transport	13 September 2026	–	
Grafton	Auckland Transport	9 April 2010	–	Replaced the nearby Boston Rd Station.
Newmarket^{H}	Auckland Transport	20 December 1873	–	
Remuera	Auckland Transport	20 December 1873	–	
Greenlane	Auckland Transport	20 December 1873	–	
Ellerslie	Auckland Transport	20 December 1873	–	
Penrose	Auckland Transport	24 December 1873	–	
Southdown	—N/a	8 August 1905	30 May 2004	
Westfield	—N/a	29 August 1887	12 March 2017	
Ōtāhuhu^{H}	Auckland Transport	20 May 1875	–	New station and bus-train interchange opened October 2016.
Māngere	—N/a	18 September 1908	9 December 2011	Services reduced to set-down of school students at the southbound platform only from 25 October 2005. Southbound platform closed on 9 December 2011. Both northbound and southbound platforms demolished 2012.
Middlemore	Auckland Transport	20 July 1947	–	
Papatoetoe	Auckland Transport	20 May 1875	–	
Puhinui^{H}	Auckland Transport, Te Huia	29 June 1925	–	New station and bus-train interchange opened on 26 July 2021.
Wiri	Auckland Transport	9 December 1913	14 February 2005	Rebuilt in 2013 as a staff-only station.
Homai	Auckland Transport	15 August 1924	–	
Manurewa^{H}	Auckland Transport	20 May 1875	–	Opened at a new site on 19 July 1993.
Te Mahia	Auckland Transport	16 August 1926	–	
Takaanini	Auckland Transport	9 December 1913	–	
Tironui	—N/a	10 May 1926	13 August 1983	New station currently (2012) proposed just north of former Tironui station at Walters Road by Papakura Local Board.
Papakura^{H}	Auckland Transport, Northern Explorer	20 May 1875	–	Current station rebuilt and reopened in 2013.
Ōpaheke	—N/a	c. April 1884	13 November 1955	
Drury	—N/a	20 May 1875	21 May 1972	Opened at a new site on 8 December 1918 replacing the original station and another station at Runciman. New station at Drury Central to be built by 2026.
Runciman	—N/a	7 October 1874	8 December 1918	Replaced by the Drury station in 1918.
Ngākōroa	—N/a	Under construction		New station at Ngakoroa (Drury West) to be built by 2027.
Paerātā	—N/a	20 May 1875	24 July 1972	New station at Paerata Rise to be built by 2026.
Pukekohe^{H}	Auckland Transport, Te Huia	20 May 1875	–	Between 20 July 2015 and 13 August 2022, a diesel train shuttle service operated between Papakura and Pukekohe, necessitating a transfer by passengers at Papakura, as that section of line had not been electrified at the time. In 2016, construction began on a new station and bus-train interchange. This opened on 6 June 2018. The station closed for redevelopment and electrification works on 13 August 2022 and reopened and became the new terminus for electric services on 3 February 2025.
^{H} Major transport hub station.				

=== Onehunga West line ===
Name	Served by	Opened	Closed	Notes
Henderson^{H}	Auckland Transport	21 December 1880	–	Rebuilt on 24 October 2006. Reopened on 2 November 2006.
Sunnyvale	Auckland Transport	28 February 1924	–	
Waikomiti	—N/a	c. 1880	?	Only used for cemetery services.
Westbrook	—N/a	6 September 1957	18 August 1980	Closed on a six-month trial basis that was made permanent on 16 August 1981.
Glen Eden	Auckland Transport	29 March 1880	–	
Croydon Road	—N/a	c. December 1911	18 August 1980	Closed on a six-month trial basis that was made permanent on 16 August 1981.
Fruitvale Road	Auckland Transport	28 September 1953	–	
New Lynn^{H}	Auckland Transport	29 March 1880	–	Original station closed on 28 June 1986. New station opened in 1984 and replaced with temporary facility on 4 May 2009 pending completion of trench. Current station opened on 24 Sep 2010.
St George's Street	—N/a	November 1907	18 August 1980	Closed on a six-month trial basis that was made permanent on 16 August 1981.
Avondale	Auckland Transport	29 March 1880	–	Original station replaced with a temporary facility on 19 January 2009 pending completion of new station. Reopened on 8 June 2010.
Mount Albert	Auckland Transport	29 March 1880	–	Platform rebuilt and upgraded and pedestrian walkways opened in 2-stage programme 2012–2016.
Baldwin Avenue	Auckland Transport	28 September 1953	–	
Morningside	Auckland Transport	April 1882	–	
Kingsland	Auckland Transport	29 March 1880	–	
Maungawhau^{H}	Auckland Transport	29 March 1880	–	Closed until 2026 for redevelopment of the City Rail Link construction.
Grafton	Auckland Transport	9 April 2010	–	Replaced the nearby Boston Rd Station.
Newmarket^{H}	Auckland Transport	20 December 1873	–	Terminus from 24 June 2022.
Remuera	Auckland Transport	20 December 1873	–	
Greenlane	Auckland Transport	20 December 1873	–	
Ellerslie Racecourse	—N/a	c. April 1884	1973	
Ellerslie	Auckland Transport	20 December 1873	–	
Penrose	Auckland Transport	24 December 1873	–	
Te Papapa	Auckland Transport	8 April 1877	–	Closed on 19 February 1973 and reopened on 18 September 2010. Services recommenced on 19 September 2010.
Onehunga	Auckland Transport	20 December 1873	–	Closed on 19 February 1973 and reopened on 18 September 2010. Services recommenced on 19 September 2010.
Onehunga Wharf	—N/a	c. April 1892	1927	
^{H} Major transport hub station.				

=== East West line ===
Name	Served by	Opened	Closed	Notes
Manukau^{H}	Auckland Transport	15 April 2012	–	A bus interchange (Manukau bus station) adjacent to the station was opened in April 2018.
Puhinui^{H}	Auckland Transport, Te Huia	29 June 1925	–	New station and bus-train interchange opened on 26 July 2021.
Papatoetoe	Auckland Transport	20 May 1875	–	
Middlemore	Auckland Transport	20 July 1947	–	
Māngere	—N/a	c. July 1908	9 December 2011	Services reduced to set-down of school students at the southbound platform only from 25 October 2005. Southbound platform closed on 9 December 2011. Both northbound and southbound platforms demolished 2012.
Ōtāhuhu^{H}	Auckland Transport	20 May 1875	–	New station and bus-train interchange opened October 2016.
Westfield	—N/a	29 August 1887	12 March 2017	
Sylvia Park	Auckland Transport	1 September 1929	–	Original station closed on 6 March 1983. A new station opened on 2 July 2007 adjacent to the Sylvia Park mall.
Panmure^{H}	Auckland Transport	16 November 1930	–	An upgraded station was opened in the first half of 2007.
Tamaki	—N/a	16 November 1930	13 October 2003	
Glen Innes	Auckland Transport	6 May 1930	–	
Purewa	—N/a	1930	16 April 1947	
Meadowbank	Auckland Transport	21 July 1947	–	Replaced the original Purewa station but was also known as Purewa until 22 February 1954.
Ōrākei	Auckland Transport	16 November 1930	–	
Waitematā^{H}	Auckland Transport	7 July 2003	–	
Te Waihorotiu^{H}	Auckland Transport	13 September 2026	–	
Karanga-a-Hape^{H}	Auckland Transport	13 September 2026	–	
Maungawhau^{H}	Auckland Transport	29 March 1880	–	Closed until 2026 for redevelopment of the City Rail Link construction.
Kingsland	Auckland Transport	29 March 1880	–	
Morningside	Auckland Transport	April 1882	–	
Baldwin Avenue	Auckland Transport	28 September 1953	–	
Mount Albert	Auckland Transport	29 March 1880	–	Platform rebuilt and upgraded and pedestrian walkways opened in 2-stage programme 2012–2016.
Avondale	Auckland Transport	29 March 1880	–	Original station replaced with a temporary facility on 19 January 2009 pending completion of new station. Reopened on 8 June 2010.
St George's Street	—N/a	November 1907	18 August 1980	Closed on a six-month trial basis that was made permanent on 16 August 1981.
New Lynn^{H}	Auckland Transport	29 March 1880	–	Original station closed on 28 June 1986. New station opened in 1984 and replaced with temporary facility on 4 May 2009 pending completion of trench. Current station opened on 24 Sep 2010.
Fruitvale Road	Auckland Transport	28 September 1953	–	
Croydon Road	—N/a	c. December 1911	18 August 1980	Closed on a six-month trial basis that was made permanent on 16 August 1981.
Glen Eden	Auckland Transport	29 March 1880	–	
Westbrook	—N/a	6 September 1957	18 August 1980	Closed on a six-month trial basis that was made permanent on 16 August 1981.
Waikomiti	—N/a	c. 1880	?	Only used for cemetery services.
Sunnyvale	Auckland Transport	28 February 1924	–	
Henderson^{H}	Auckland Transport	21 December 1880	–	Rebuilt on 24 October 2006. Reopened on 2 November 2006.
Sturges Road	Auckland Transport	1934	–	
Rānui	Auckland Transport	16 November 1925	–	
Swanson	Auckland Transport	18 July 1881	–	Terminus for electric unit services. Platform replaced in 2000.
Waitākere	—N/a	18 July 1881	20 July 2015	Hourly bus shuttles operate between Swanson station and Waitakere station as that section of line has not been electrified.
Taupaki	—N/a	18 July 1881	31 July 1967	Services were extended to Helensville Station for a trial period from 14 July 2008 to 24 December 2009, passing through Taupaki (Taupaki was not a station, however)
Kumeū	—N/a	April 1884	31 July 1967	
Huapai	—N/a	29 October 1875	31 July 1967	Originally opened as a station on the Kumeu–Riverhead Section, becoming a Western Line station in July 1881. Services were extended to Helensville Station for a trial period from 14 July 2008 to 24 December 2009
Waimauku	—N/a	29 October 1875	31 July 1967	Originally opened as a station on the Kumeu–Riverhead Section, becoming a Western Line station in July 1881. Services were extended to Helensville station for a trial period from 14 July 2008 to 24 December 2009.
Helensville	—N/a	18 July 1881	31 July 1967	Services were extended to Helensville station for a trial period from 14 July 2008 to 24 December 2009.
^{H} Major transport hub station.				

== New stations ==
Ngākōroa station is being built and is expected to open in 2027. A new station at Tironui has been proposed, to serve new urban areas developing in the south of the city.

== See also ==
- List of suburban and commuter rail systems
- List of railway stations in the Wellington Region
