= Panmure railway station, Auckland =

Train station in New Zealand

Panmure
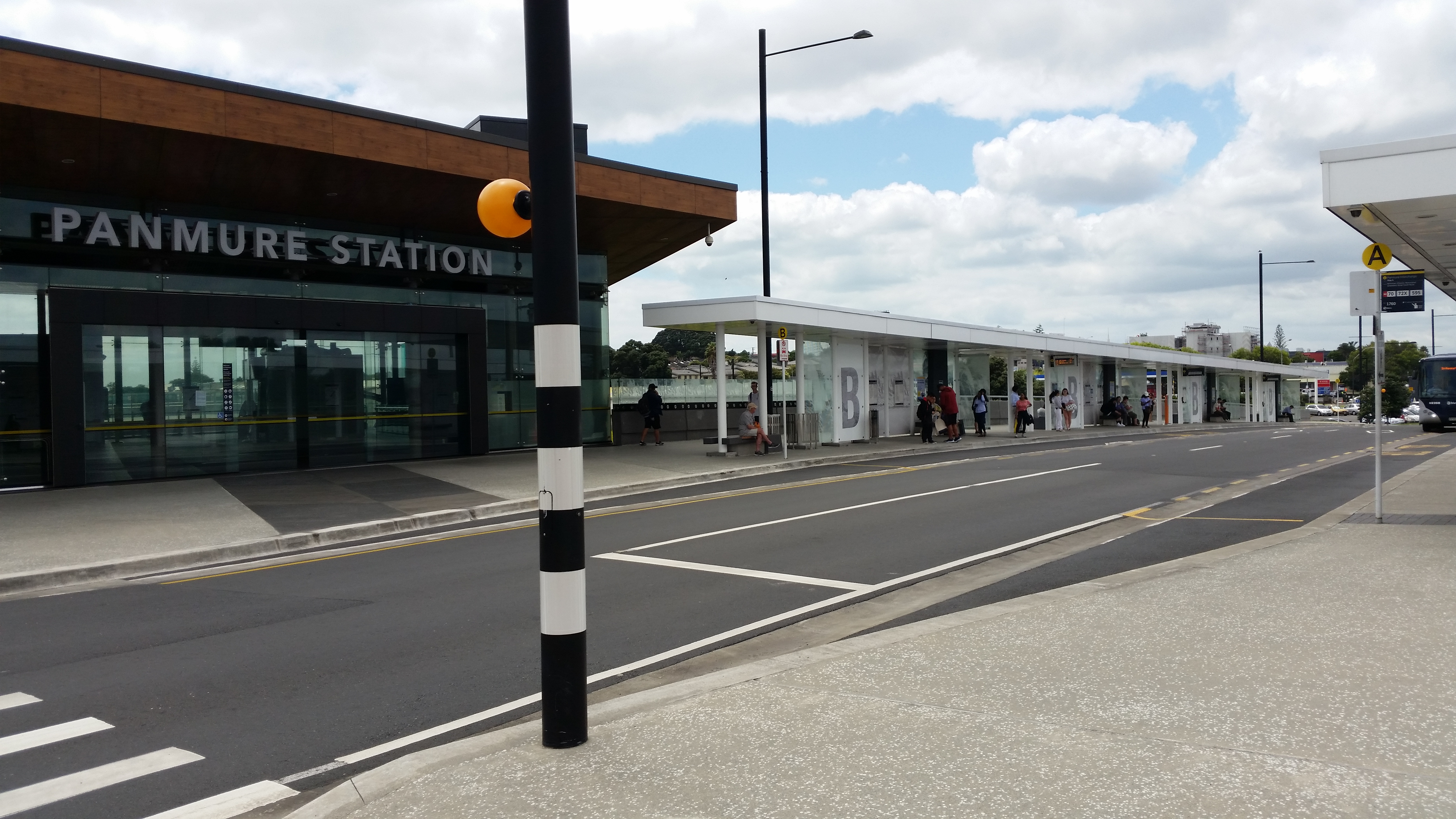
- The station's main entrance and the adjacent bus interchange, January 2018

General information
- Location: Panmure, Auckland; New Zealand
- Coordinates: 36.8977°S 174.8497°E
- System: Auckland Transport Urban rail
- Owner: KiwiRail (track and platforms); Auckland Transport (buildings)
- Operator: Auckland One Rail
- Line: North Island Main Trunk
- Distance: 670.41 km (416.57 mi) from Wellington
- Platforms: Side platforms (P1 & P2)
- Tracks: Mainline (2)

Construction
- Parking: Yes
- Cycle facilities: Yes; racks inside the building
- Accessible: Yes (Lifts)

Other information
- Fare zone: Isthmus

History
- Opened: 16 November 1930
- Rebuilt: 2012–2014
- Electrified: 15 September 2014

Passengers
- 2018: 3,700 boardings daily

Services
Preceding station	Auckland Transport (Auckland One Rail)	Following station
Glen Innes towards Swanson	East West Line	Sylvia Park towards Manukau
Location
- 1: Original site, 2: Current site 2007–

Panmure railway station is located on the North Island Main Trunk line in New Zealand. East West line services of the Auckland railway network are the only regular services that stop at the station. The original Panmure Station opened on 16 November 1930, on a site to the south of the current station. The station was relocated to its current site in 2007. Panmure Station received a major upgrade and became a significant bus-rail interchange, as part of the AMETI project, during the 2012–2014 period.

== History ==
The original station was constructed, along with five others, in 1929 on the route of the Westfield Deviation, which was being built to divert the Auckland–Westfield section of the North Island Main Trunk line (NIMT) via a flatter, faster eastern route to link up with the original NIMT tracks at Westfield Junction.

The deviation was opened for traffic on 11 May 1930. Panmure Station opened on 16 November 1930, and was situated about 100m west of Ireland Road. A small station building was located in the middle of the station's island platform. At the time of opening, the area surrounding the station was predominantly rural. Access to the station was originally provided by two pedestrian bridges. A ramp from the northern end of the platform led to a bridge between Ireland Road and the western side of the station, from where a path provided access to the Ellerslie-Panmure Highway. From the southern end of the platform, a bridge provided access from the platform to a path which led to the Mount Wellington Highway.

By the end of the 1950s the area surrounding the station had become substantially more developed. Ireland Place had become a residential street, and there was a mix of residential and light industrial development on Mount Wellington Highway. Several side-streets had been built between Mount Wellington Highway and the railway. Access from the northern bridge to Ireland Road had been removed, and ramps were added from the southern bridge to William Harvey Place (off Mount Wellington Highway) and Ireland Road.

=== Relocation ===
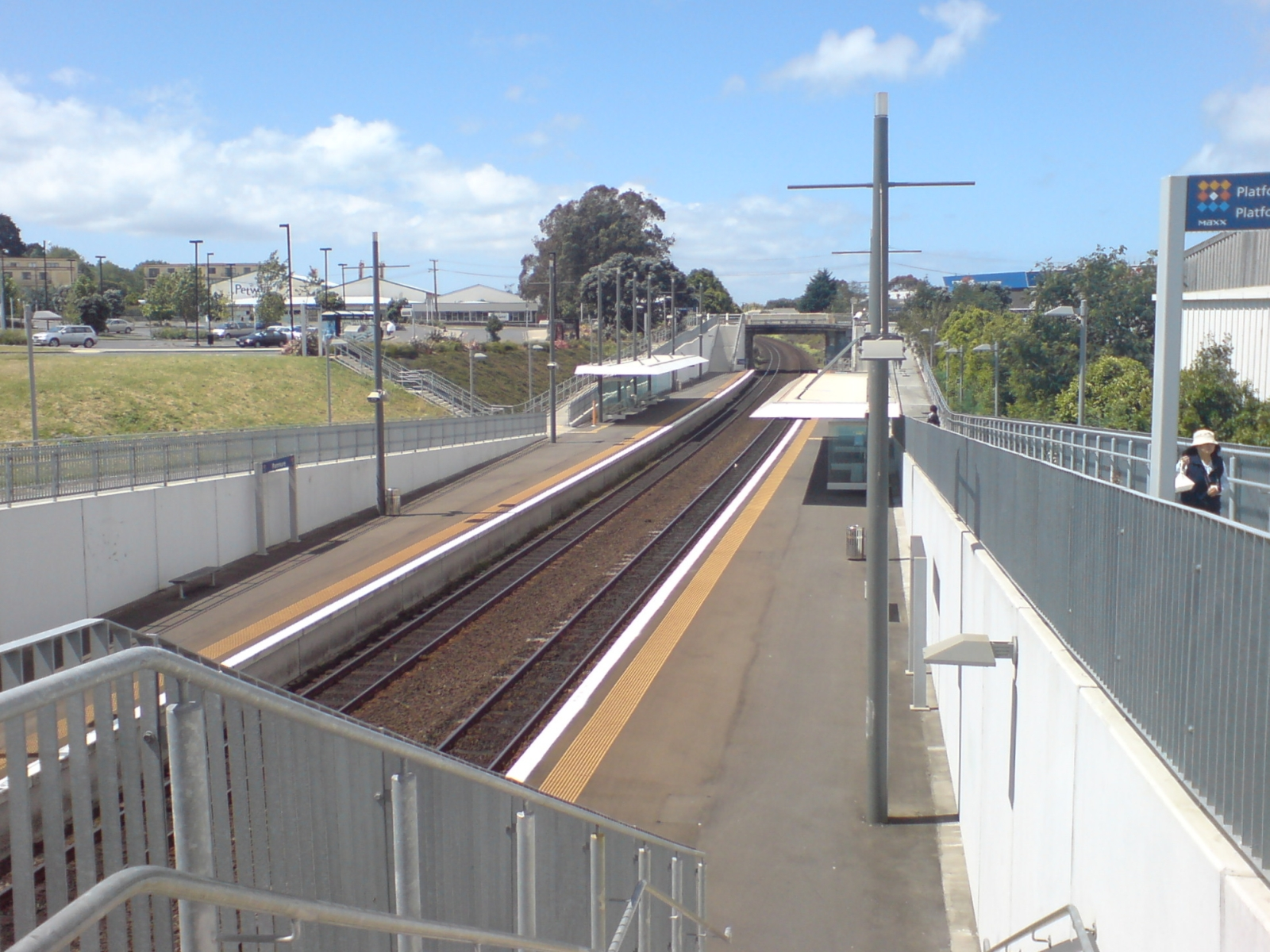
Looking north into the trench, 2010

By the turn of the century, Panmure had grown substantially. The condition of the station, however, had deteriorated. The original station building had been replaced by a much smaller one, the northern footbridge had been removed, and the platform itself had begun to deteriorate. In addition, patronage was low (recorded as 83 boardings per day in 2003) and the station was not located close to the town centre. It was therefore decided to close the original Panmure Station and open a new station between Ellerslie-Panmure Highway and Mountain Road. The new station would be more modern, be closer to the town centre, and provide better connections with bus services. The station was opened in the first half of 2007. It has two side platforms, located below road level. Access is from Ellerslie-Panmure Highway, Mountain Road, and the carpark. A park and ride facility is located adjacent to the eastbound platform. The station's relocation had a significant effect on patronage with recorded daily boardings climbing from 268 in 2006 to 446 in 2007.

=== Bus-train interchange ===
In October 2011, work began on the AMETI project, with the replacement of the Mountain Road bridge, immediately north of the station. AMETI is a $1.5-billion initiative designed to reduce congestion and improve public transport in Auckland's eastern suburbs. In May 2012, construction of a pedestrian plaza over part of the platforms and an adjacent bus station with dedicated bus lanes began. The plaza and bus station were opened in January 2014. The new plaza provides access from the carpark and bus stop to both platforms via escalators and stairs.

In 2018, the station was the fifth busiest in Auckland, with 3,700 passenger boardings daily.

The station was temporarily closed between March 2023 and January 2024 due to Stage 2 of the Rail Network Rebuild. During this time, AT HOP faregates and a bus driver rest area were installed in the primary station building.

== Services ==
Auckland One Rail, on behalf of Auckland Transport, operates East West line suburban services between Swanson and Manukau via Panmure.

=== Buses ===
Panmure station is served by routes 70, 70H, 72C, 72M, 72X, 74, 323, 352, 711, 712, 744, 747 and 751.

== See also ==
- List of Auckland railway stations
- Public transport in Auckland
