= Ōrākei railway station =

Train station in Auckland, New Zealand

Ōrākei
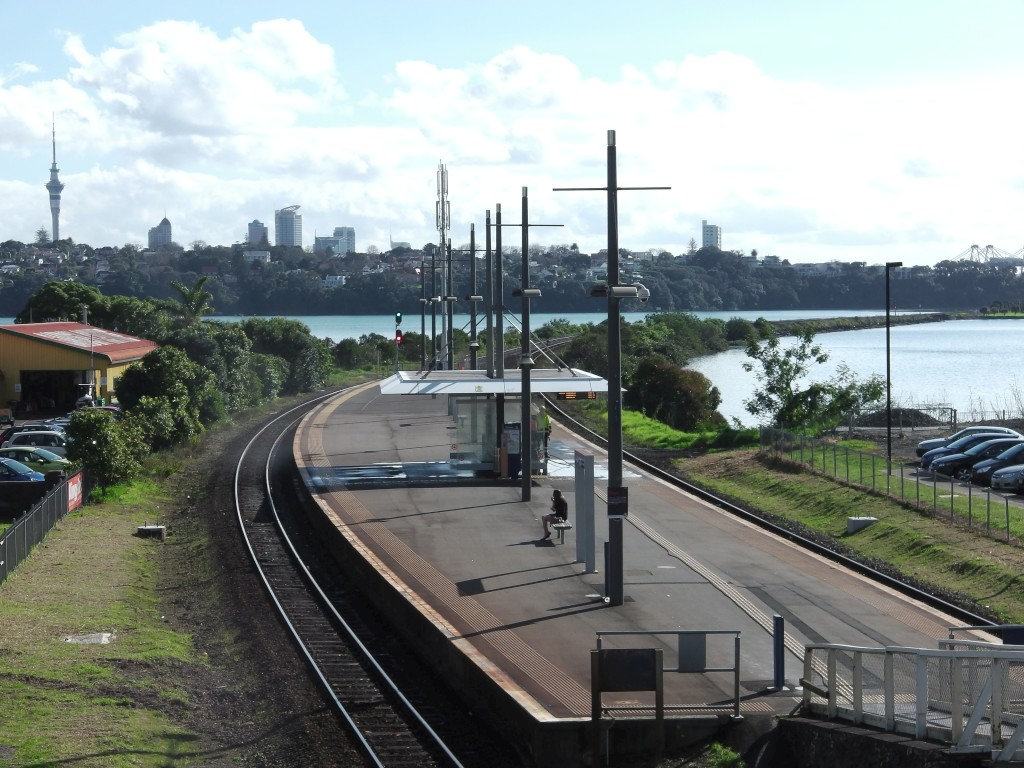
- The station in 2013, looking westwards

General information
- Location: 240 Orakei Road, Auckland; New Zealand
- Coordinates: 36.862426°S 174.809553°E
- System: Auckland Transport Urban rail
- Owner: KiwiRail (track and platforms); Auckland Transport (buildings)
- Operator: Auckland One Rail
- Line: North Island Main Trunk
- Distance: 677.44 km (420.94 mi) from Wellington
- Platforms: Island platform (P1 & P2)
- Tracks: Mainline (2)

Construction
- Parking: Yes
- Cycle facilities: Yes
- Accessible: Yes

Other information
- Fare zone: Isthmus

History
- Opened: 16 November 1930

Passengers
- 2011: 983 passengers/weekday

Services
Preceding station	Auckland Transport (Auckland One Rail)	Following station
Waitematā towards Swanson	East West Line	Meadowbank towards Manukau
Location

Ōrākei railway station serves the Auckland suburbs of Orakei, located on the North Island Main Trunk line in New Zealand. East West line services of the Auckland railway network are the only services that regularly stop at the station. It has an island platform layout and can be reached by an overbridge from Ōrākei Road. It is backed by a car-park and a shopping complex.

== History ==
The station was originally constructed, along with five others, in 1929 on the route of the Westfield Deviation, which was being built to divert the Auckland–Westfield section of the North Island Main Trunk line (NIMT) via a flatter, faster eastern route to link up with the original NIMT tracks at Westfield Junction.

The site, 2 mi 5 ch (3.3 km) from the new Auckland station and 7 mi 55 ch (12.4 km) from Westfield, was levelled in 1925, requiring 300,000 cart loads to be removed. J W Bambury Ltd built the flag station of wood, with a tiled roof. In 1953 2 railway houses were built. The station burnt down on 27 May 1972, leaving only parts of the walls and verandah. It was replaced by a temporary shed. By 1989 it had a concrete block shelter shed and a platform 164 m (538 ft) long and 250 mm (9.8 in) high 250 mm.

The station was temporarily closed between March 2023 and January 2024 due to Stage 2 of the Rail Network Rebuild. The Eastern Line was temporarily closed between Ōtāhuhu and Britomart for major track renewal work and prepared the Eastern Line for the opening of the City Rail Link. During this time, a rail bus replacement was used instead of running trains.

== Services ==
Auckland One Rail, on behalf of Auckland Transport, operates East West line suburban services between Swanson and Manukau via this station.

Bus route 781 serves Ōrākei station.

== See also ==
- List of Auckland railway stations
