= Papatoetoe railway station =

Train station in Auckland, New Zealand

Papatoetoe
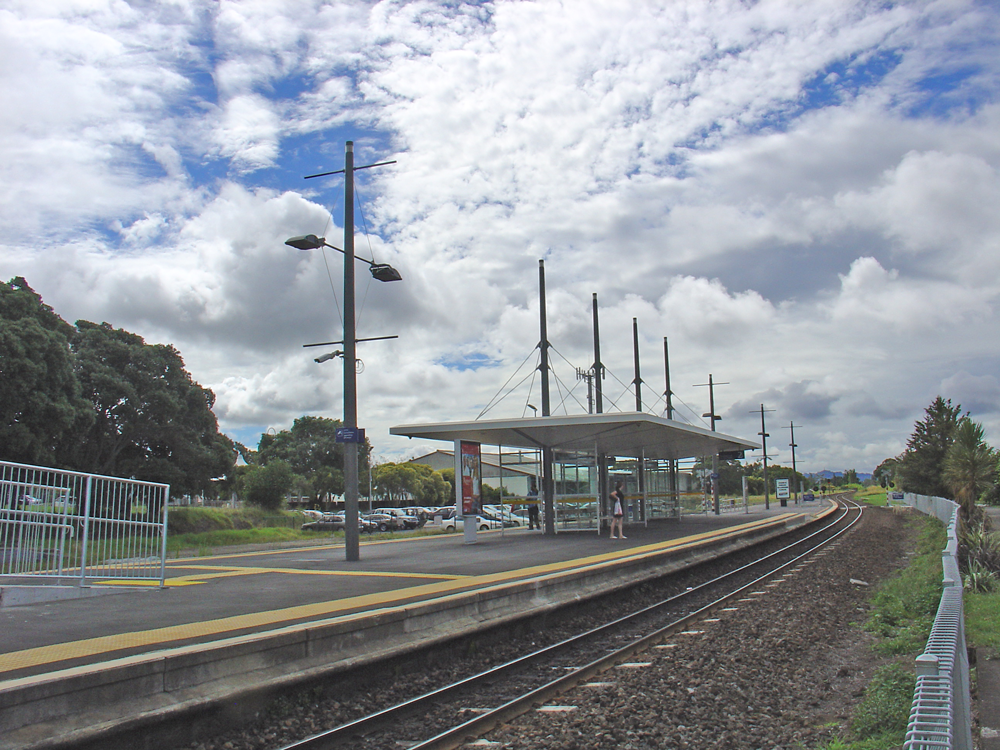
- Papatoetoe Train Station

General information
- Location: Papatoetoe, Auckland; New Zealand
- Coordinates: 36°58′42″S 174°50′59″E
- System: Auckland Transport Urban rail
- Owner: KiwiRail (track and platforms); Auckland Transport (buildings)
- Operator: Auckland One Rail
- Line: North Island Main Trunk
- Distance: 660.42 km (410.37 mi) from Wellington
- Platforms: Island platform (P1 & P2)
- Tracks: Mainline (3)

Construction
- Parking: Yes
- Cycle facilities: Yes
- Accessible: Yes

Other information
- Fare zone: Northern Manukau

History
- Opened: 20 May 1875
- Rebuilt: 2006
- Electrified: April 2014

Passengers
- 2011: 3,074 passengers/weekday

Services
Preceding station	Auckland Transport (Auckland One Rail)	Following station
Middlemore towards Swanson	East West Line	Puhinui towards Manukau
Puhinui towards Pukekohe	South City Line	Middlemore towards Newmarket
Location

Papatoetoe railway station is on the South City line and East West line of the Auckland railway network in New Zealand. It is between Station Road and Shirley Road, across the street from Papatoetoe West School, and has an island platform layout.

== History ==
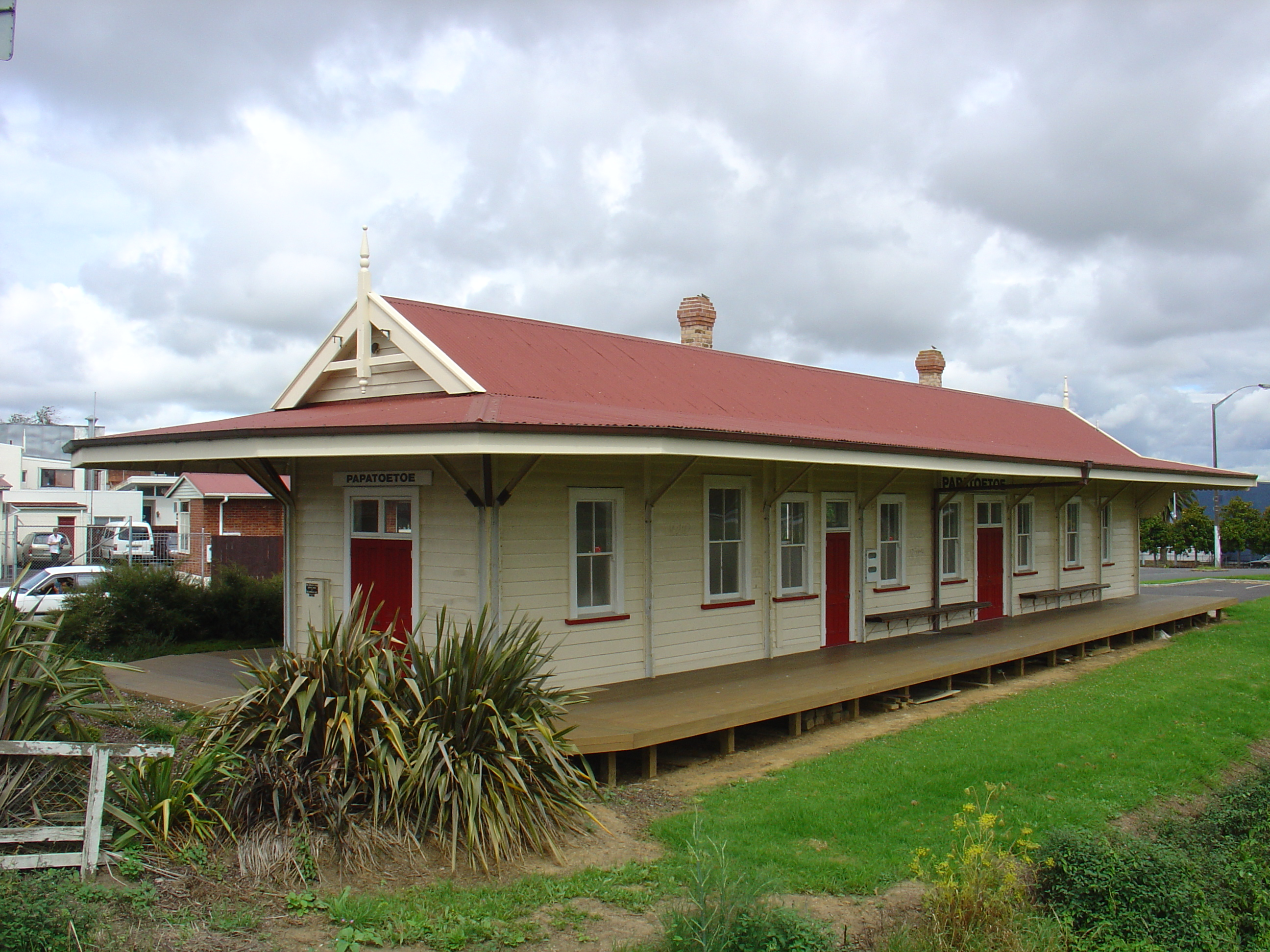
Papatoetoe's old railway station – a local landmark

Papatoetoe was originally called Papatoitoi, a corruption of its true name. The name was corrected in 1907, by the New Zealand Railways Department, because of the obvious discrepancy with the town it served, which has always been spelt as "Papatoetoe".

The station was first opened in 1875, at a site near the modern-day Station Road bridge. In 1919, the station building was substantially extended. The station building was closed in 1987, and removed from the site in 1999.

In 2005, the 1920 railway pedestrian bridge was moved from the site, becoming the Aerovista Footbridge along the Puhinui Creek in Wiri.

=== Old station building ===
The old station building, restored by the Papatoetoe Railway Station Preservation Trust, was moved to the corner of Station Road, Shirley Road, Tavern Lane & St George Street and repurposed into a café, opening on 31 October 2004. Parts of this building dated back to 1875.

The old station is an integral part of the area's history, with Old Papatoetoe developing as a commercial centre.

=== Timeline ===
Year	Notes
1875	The railway line from Auckland reached Papatoetoe. The first railway station was built between May and August and named Papatoitoi Station (note spelling). The building was on the western side of the present road bridge.
1887	The stationmaster was removed from the station due to the financial depression. The station became an unofficered flag station until 1914.
1907	The station name was changed to Papatoetoe.
1914	The station had two rooms added to it, and was open for all business, with a new stationmaster being appointed. Reports list the station as being moved to the western side of the track.
1918	The station was moved and resited.
1919	The station reopened, with a 14-ft diameter railway windmill and a 6000-gallon water vat. These provided water for the station and for locomotives that shunted or turned at Papatoetoe. A peaked roof and verandahs were added during this time.
1926	The reinforced concrete road bridge south of the station was built by the Public Works Department, replacing a temporary wooden structure.
1928	A row of railway houses was built in Station Road, on the west side of the station. Fabricated sections were supplied by the New Zealand Railways House Factory, Frankton.
1942	The windmill and water tower were removed after the station was connected to the town water supply.
1976	After a burglary, the goods shed was set alight and burnt down.
1987	Staff were withdrawn after a centralisation of booking offices.

== Services ==
Auckland One Rail, on behalf of Auckland Transport, operates East West line and South City line services.

== See also ==
- List of Auckland railway stations
- Public transport in Auckland
