= Ellerslie Racecourse railway station =

Defunct train station in Auckland, New Zealand

Coordinates: 36.8916°S 174.8011°E

Ellerslie Racecourse
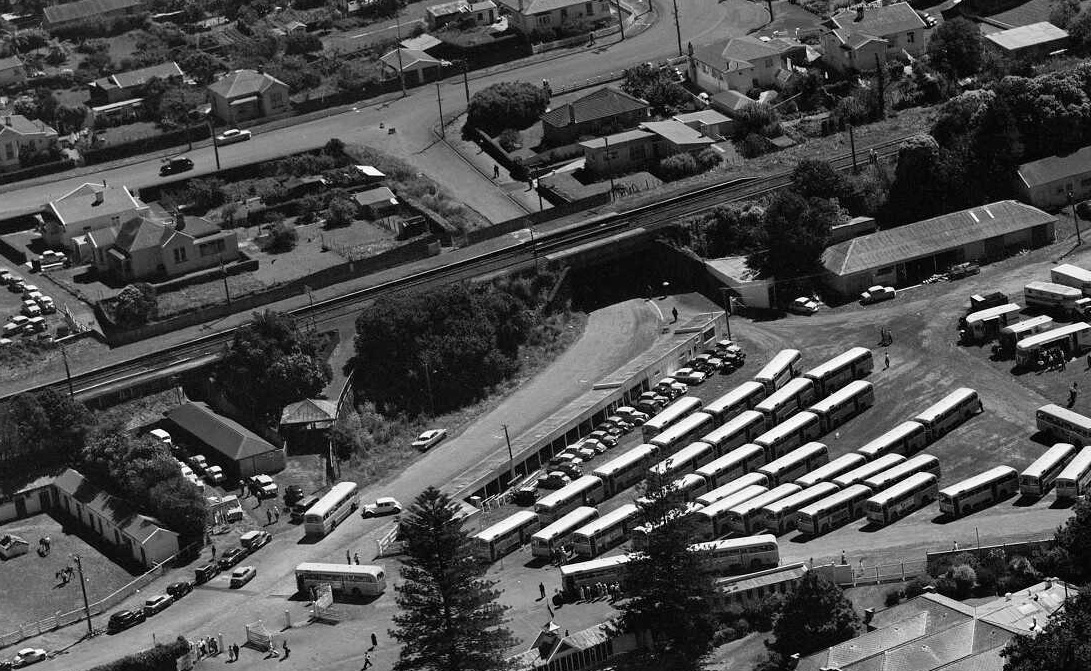
- The Ellerslie Racecourse railway station in 1960

General information
- Location: New Zealand
- Line: North Auckland Line

History
- Opened: April 1884
- Closed: September 1971
Location

Ellerslie Racecourse railway station was a station on the first railway line in Auckland, New Zealand. The line ran between central Auckland and the suburb (and port) of Onehunga. It is called the Onehunga Line today, and is one of the four lines of the Auckland railway network.

The platform provided access to the Ellerslie Racecourse. The racecourse was 4 miles (6.4 km) from the central station, and many race goers travelled by train, though as late as 1910 the journey was sometimes in open coal trucks and goods wagons because not enough passenger carriages were available.

The station or platform opened in January 1874. There was a suggestion in January 1878 that it should move to Greenlane, but the Jockey Club did not agree. It was closed in September 1971. The surfaces of the two side platforms were removed long ago and they are now grassed over, but the concrete abutments facing the tracks are still extant.

== See also ==
- Greenlane railway station
