= Mangere railway station =

Train station in Auckland, New Zealand

Coordinates: 36.9556°S 174.8347°E

Mangere
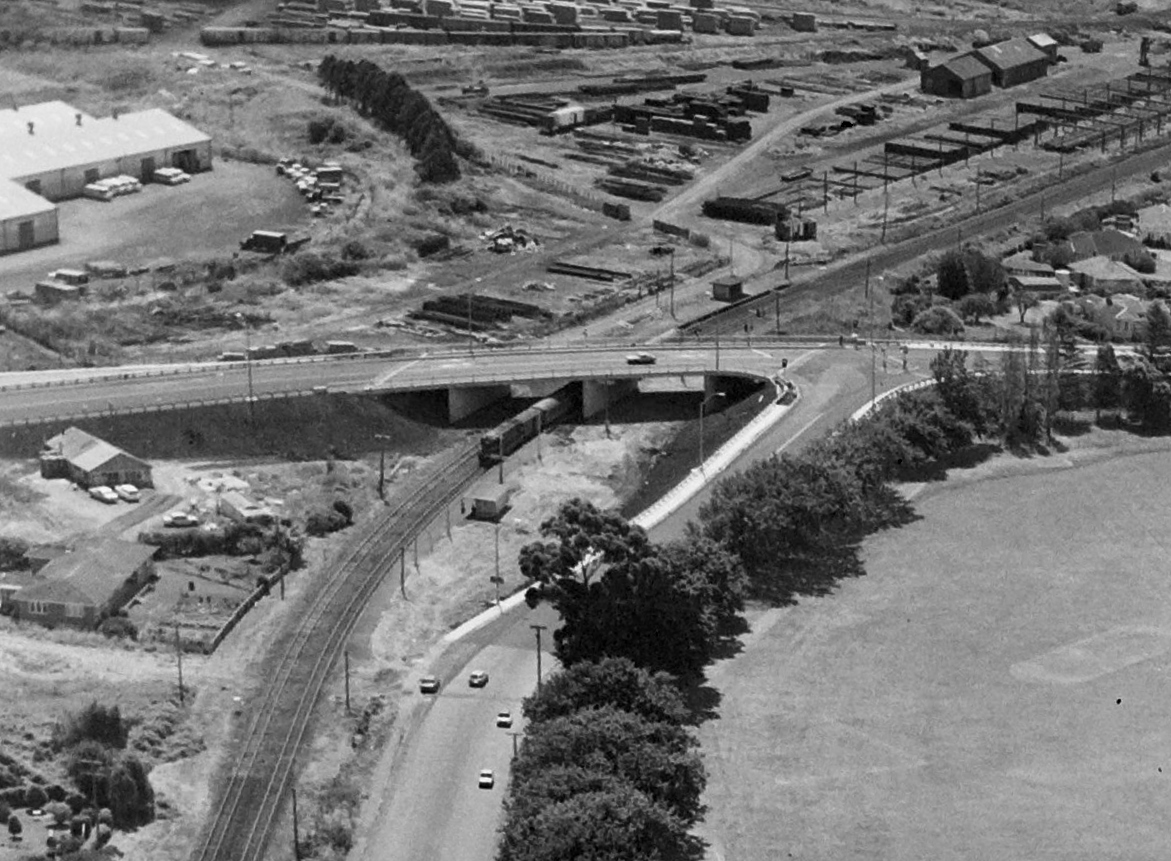
- Mangere railway station in 1977.

General information
- Location: Māngere, Auckland; New Zealand
- Line: North Island Main Trunk
- Distance: 663.02 km (411.98 mi) from Wellington
- Tracks: Mainline (2)

Construction
- Parking: No
- Cycle facilities: No

History
- Opened: 18 September 1908
- Closed: 9 December 2011
- Rebuilt: 1972

Passengers
- Passengers per weekday
- 2003: 398
- 2004: 481 ▲20.85%
- 2005: 374 ▼22.25%
- 2006: 231 ▼38.24%
- 2007: 231 0%
- 2008: 185 ▼19.91%
- 2009: 264 ▲42.7%
- 2010: 208 ▼21.21%
- 2011: 245 ▲17.79%

Adjacent stations
Preceding station	KiwiRail	Following station
Ōtāhuhu	North Island Main Trunk	Middlemore
Location

Mangere railway station was a station in Māngere, on the Eastern and Southern Lines of the Auckland railway network. It had an offset side platform layout with no connection between the two platforms. Both the northbound and southbound platforms have since been demolished.

== History ==
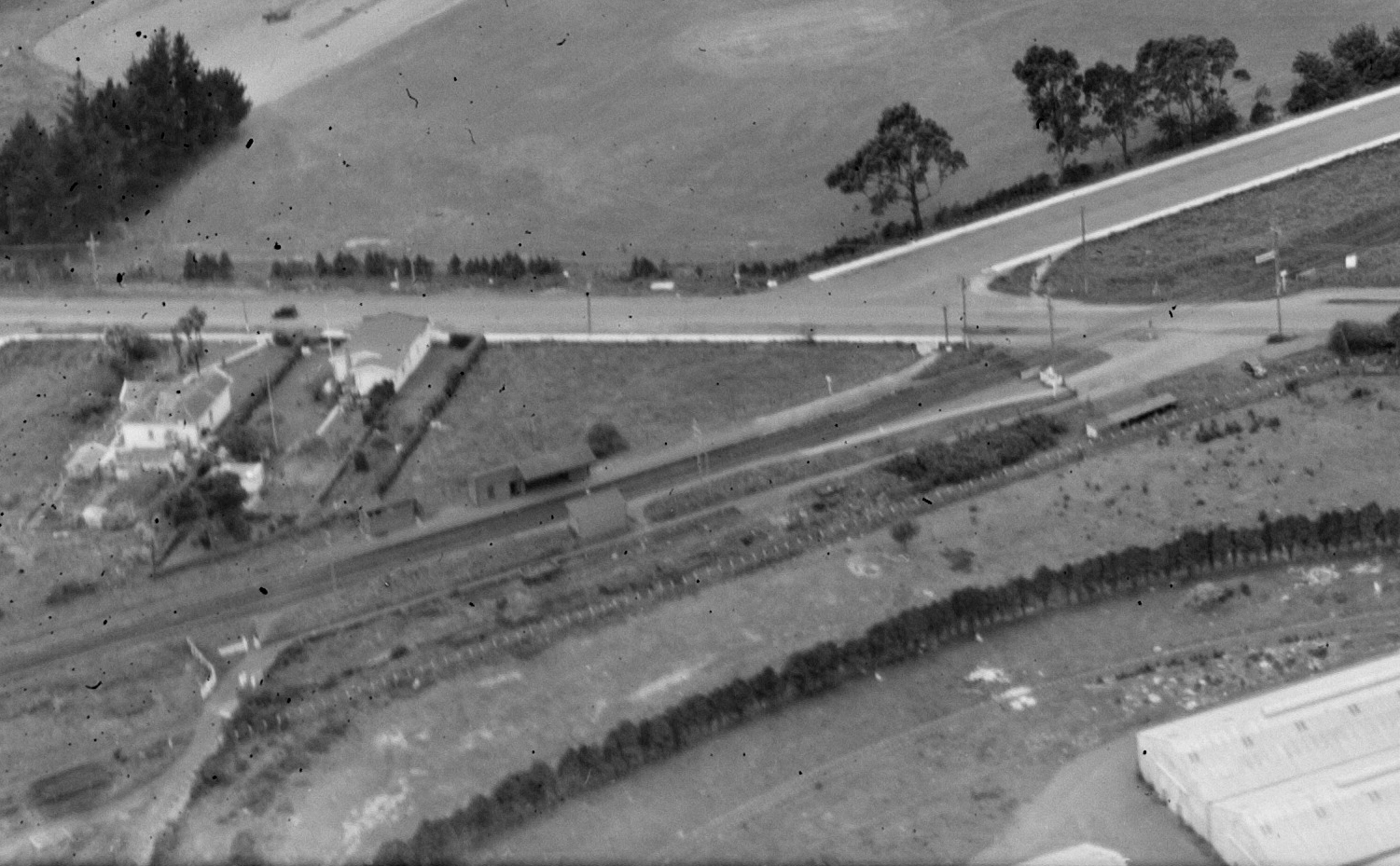
The station in November 1946. The level crossing is on the right, and the pedestrian path to the workshops is bottom left.

The railway through the area was opened on 20 May 1875, as part of the Auckland and Mercer Railway, built by Brogden & Co, who extended it from Penrose. On 6 November 1908 the line became part of the North Island Main Trunk, with services reaching Wellington.

The level crossing where the railway intersected with Mangere Road was known as Mangere Crossing. There was no station initially, but as early as 1909 passenger trains were stopping at the crossing. From c. 1908 the larger part of the road became known as Massey Road.

On 27 October 1910 a railway request stop was established to the north of the crossing, initially known as the Mangere Road station, or Mangere Crossing. The shelter shed, latrines, circular box gate, and platform asphalting were completed by 8 November 1910. On 5 February 1911 the official name became Mangere.

In 1916 a ticket office was built. In 1923 a ladies waiting room was added. In 1924 the platform was extended by 70 feet.

In 1927 the main line through the station was duplicated. The second line between Ōtāhuhu and Papatoetoe opened on 4 December 1927. A second platform was built on the western side of the tracks, with a small shelter.

The extensive Otahuhu Workshops opened to the north of the station in 1926, as a car and wagon workshop to complement the steam locomotive facilities at Wellington's Hutt Workshops. They quickly became one of the largest employers in the area, with approximately 1,000 employees, increasing to 2,300 at the height of World War II. A pedestrian path connected the workshops to the station.

In October 1942 Camp Euart, a World War II United States military camp, was established on 84 acres of farmland near the station. At its peak it housed 5000 American troops.

Middlemore railway station opened in July 1947, roughly 800 metres (2,600 ft) to the south.

From at least the 1930s, the crossing was notorious for traffic safety issues. Planning to replace it with a bridge began in 1963. The Massey Road bridge opened on 26 February 1977. To enable construction of the new bridge a bypass road was established to the north of the crossing. In 1972 the south-bound platform (which was in the path of the bypass road) was demolished, along with the old station building. A new south-bound platform and shelter was built on the other side of the bridge, giving the station an offset side platform layout.

The Railways Department was replaced by the New Zealand Railways Corporation in 1982. In an effort to alleviate its financial problems the corporation underwent a major restructuring program. As a result of this, the Otahuhu Workshops were progressively closed, with the final closure in 1992.

=== Closure ===
On 25 October 2005 the northbound platform was closed. From 25 October 2005 the only services stopping at the station were four south-bound morning peak services to set down passengers on school days only, for pupils of nearby King's College and Otahuhu College.

The station closed permanently on 9 December 2011. The closure was proposed due to the limited patronage, short distance to Middlemore Station, and the cost to upgrade the station to meet current standards (including extending the platform to accommodate 6-car trains.)

== See also ==
- List of Auckland railway stations
