= Westfield Junction =

Railway switching junction on the Auckland railway network in New Zealand

Coordinates: 36.9329°S 174.8304°E

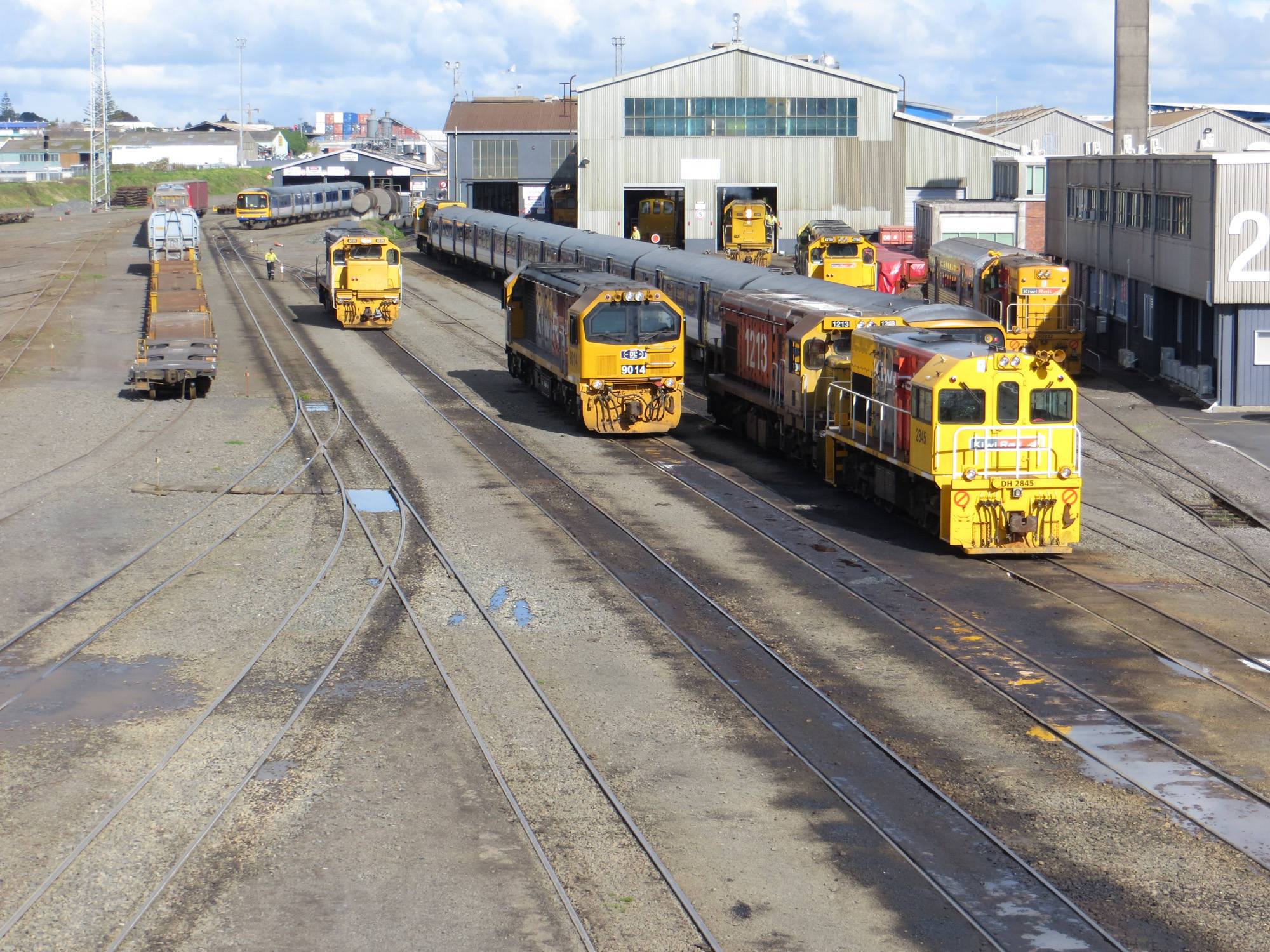
Diesel locomotives and trains at Westfield Railway Junction in 2012

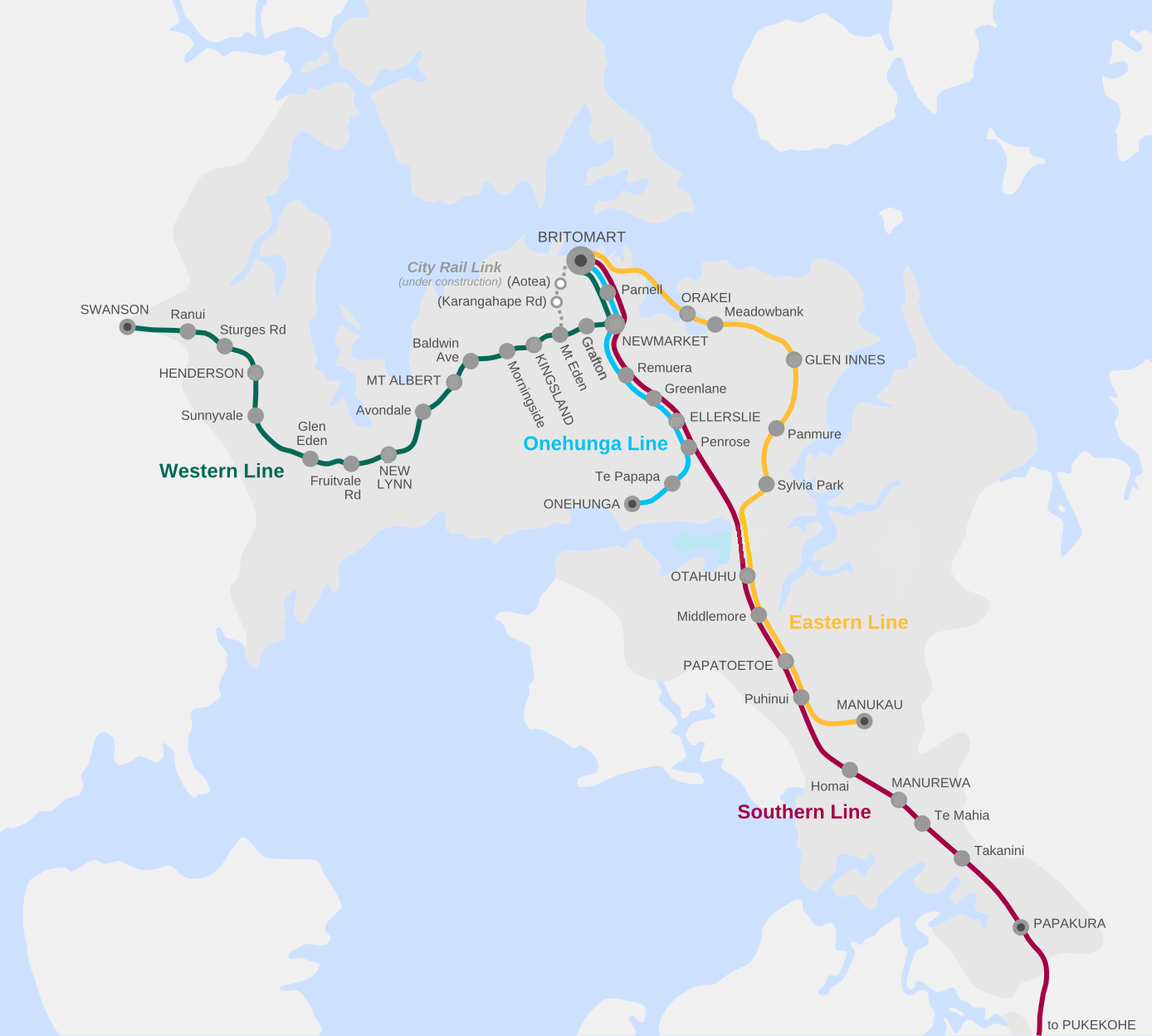
Current and proposed lines of the Auckland rail network as of 12 March 2017. Westfield Junction appears at the point where the Southern and Eastern Lines meet, north of Otahuhu Station.

Westfield Junction is a railway switching junction on the Auckland railway network in New Zealand. It is 1.9 kilometres (1.2 miles) north of Ōtāhuhu station and is surrounded by the industrial area of Westfield.

Westfield Junction defines the southernmost extremity of the North Auckland Line (NAL) via Penrose and the point where the North Island Main Trunk (NIMT) line via Glen Innes intersects with the NAL. The NIMT continues south from Westfield Junction toward Otahuhu and Papakura.

Two passenger train services pass through Westfield Junction: South City Line services between Pukekohe and Newmarket and East West Line services between Manukau and Swanson. The junction is also used by Northern Explorer services between Wellington and Auckland, excursion passenger trains, and freight trains.

Westfield station, a few hundred metres south of Westfield Junction, was closed in March 2017.

The Third Main Line begins at Westfield Junction and ends at Wiri Junction. The project began in 2020 and was completed in 2025. It is expected to ease congestion on Auckland rail lines, improve rail freight access from the Port of Auckland to the Westfield yards and allow more frequent passenger and freight services.

== See also ==
- List of Auckland railway stations
