= Glen Innes railway station =

Train station in Auckland, New Zealand

Glen Innes
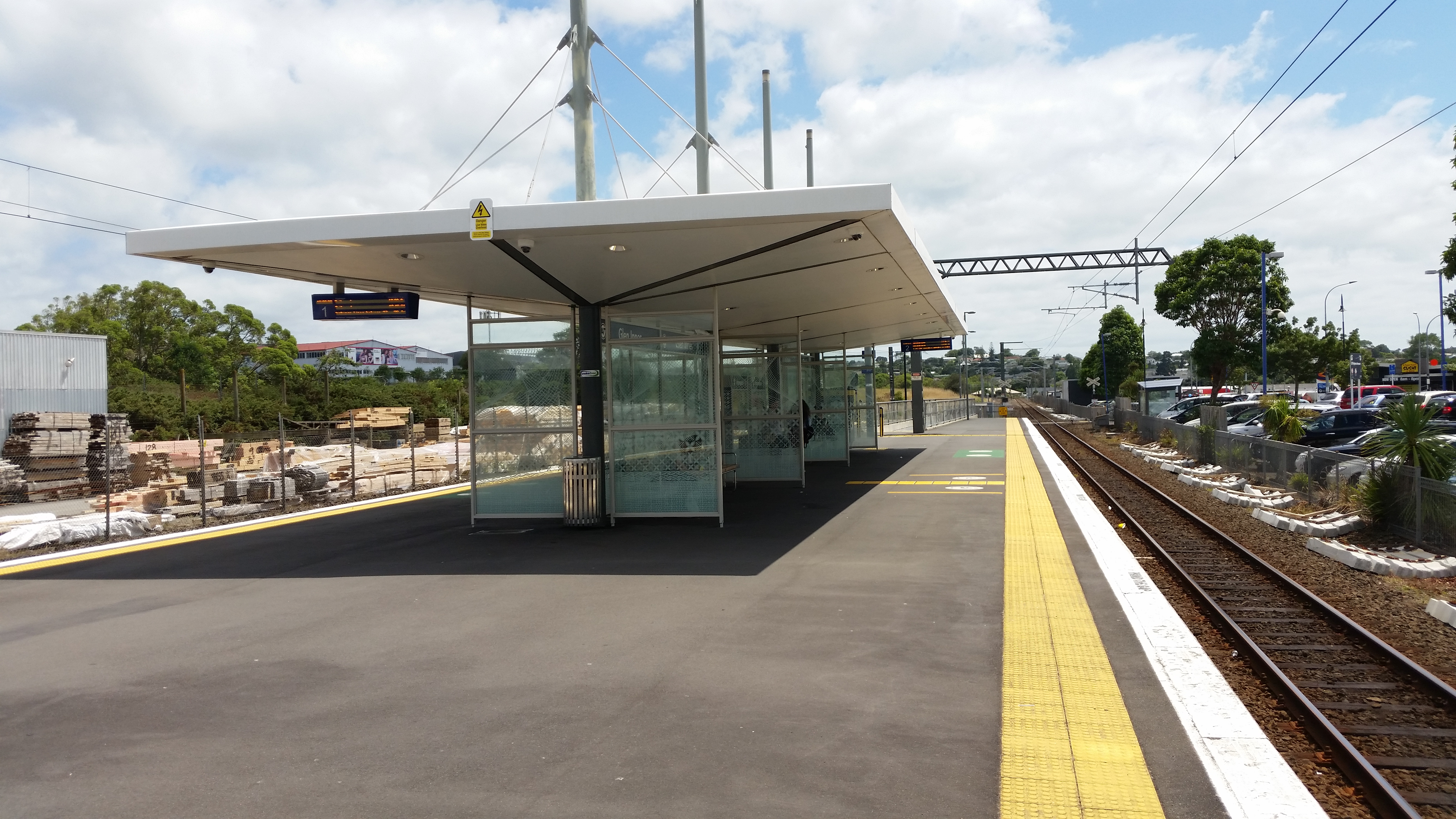
- The station in January 2018, looking northbound from the southbound side of the platform

General information
- Location: Glen Innes, Auckland; New Zealand
- Coordinates: 36.878859°S 174.854162°E
- System: Auckland Transport Urban rail
- Owner: KiwiRail (track and platforms); Auckland Transport (buildings)
- Operator: Auckland One Rail
- Line: North Island Main Trunk
- Distance: 672.64 km (417.96 mi) from Wellington
- Platforms: Island platform (P1 & P2)
- Tracks: Mainline (2)

Construction
- Parking: Yes
- Cycle facilities: Yes
- Accessible: Yes

Other information
- Fare zone: Isthmus

History
- Opened: 6 May 1930
- Electrified: 15 September 2014

Services
| Preceding station | Auckland Transport (Auckland One Rail) | Following station |
|---|---|---|
| Meadowbank towards Swanson | East West Line | Panmure towards Manukau |
Location

Glen Innes railway station is located on the North Island Main Trunk line in New Zealand. East West line services of the Auckland railway network are the only regular services that stop at the station. It has an island platform layout. In 2006 the station had a major upgrade and is one of the most used non-terminus stations by the public.

== History ==
The station was originally constructed, along with five others, in 1929 on the route of the Westfield Deviation, which was being built to divert the Auckland–Westfield section of the North Island Main Trunk line (NIMT) via a flatter, faster eastern route to link up with the original NIMT tracks at Westfield Junction.

The station was temporarily closed between March 2023 and January 2024 due to Stage 2 of the Rail Network Rebuild. The Eastern Line was temporarily closed between Ōtāhuhu and Britomart for major track renewal work and to prepare the Eastern Line for the opening of the City Rail Link.

As part of the Level Crossing Removal Programme, a pedestrian bridge and 2 lifts are being constructed at the station. Construction commenced in September 2025 and was completed in July 2026.

== Services ==
Auckland One Rail, on behalf of Auckland Transport, operates East West line services between Swanson and Manukau via Glen Innes.

Bus routes 74, 75, 76, 650, 744, 747 and the Tāmaki Link serve Glen Innes station.

== See also ==
- List of Auckland railway stations
