= Puhinui railway station =

Train station in Auckland, New Zealand

Puhinui
- Puhinui Interchange in 2026

General information
- Location: Papatoetoe, Auckland; New Zealand
- Coordinates: 36°59′23″S 174°51′22″E
- System: Auckland Transport Urban rail
- Owner: KiwiRail (track and platforms); Auckland Transport (buildings)
- Operator: Auckland One Rail
- Line: North Island Main Trunk
- Distance: 658.92 km (409.43 mi) from Wellington
- Platforms: Island platform (P1 & P2)
- Tracks: Mainline (3); Siding (1)

Construction
- Parking: No
- Cycle facilities: No
- Accessible: Yes (Lifts)

Other information
- Fare zone: Northern Manukau; Southern Manukau

History
- Opened: 29 June 1925
- Rebuilt: 26 July 2021
- Electrified: April 2014

Passengers
- 2011: 676 passengers/weekday

Services
Preceding station	Auckland Transport (Auckland One Rail)	Following station
Papatoetoe towards Swanson	East West Line	Manukau Terminus
Homai towards Pukekohe	South City Line	Papatoetoe towards Newmarket
Preceding station	KiwiRail	Following station
Auckland Strand Terminus	Te Huia	Pukekohe towards Hamilton (Frankton)

Adjacent stations
Preceding station	KiwiRail	Following station
Papatoetoe	North Island Main Trunk	Wiri
Location

Puhinui railway station is a station of the Auckland rail network and is located in Papatoetoe, New Zealand. Passenger services on the East West line and South City line, as well as Te Huia services to Hamilton, use the station. It is accessed from Puhinui Road from both sides of the tracks via a pedestrian bridge located at the site of a former level crossing. Puhinui Road itself now crosses on a bridge approximately 120 metres (390 ft) north of the pedestrian bridge.

South of this station, East West Line and South City Line services diverge, the East West onto the Manukau Branch, which terminates at Manukau. The South City continues south via Homai towards Pukekohe.

== History ==
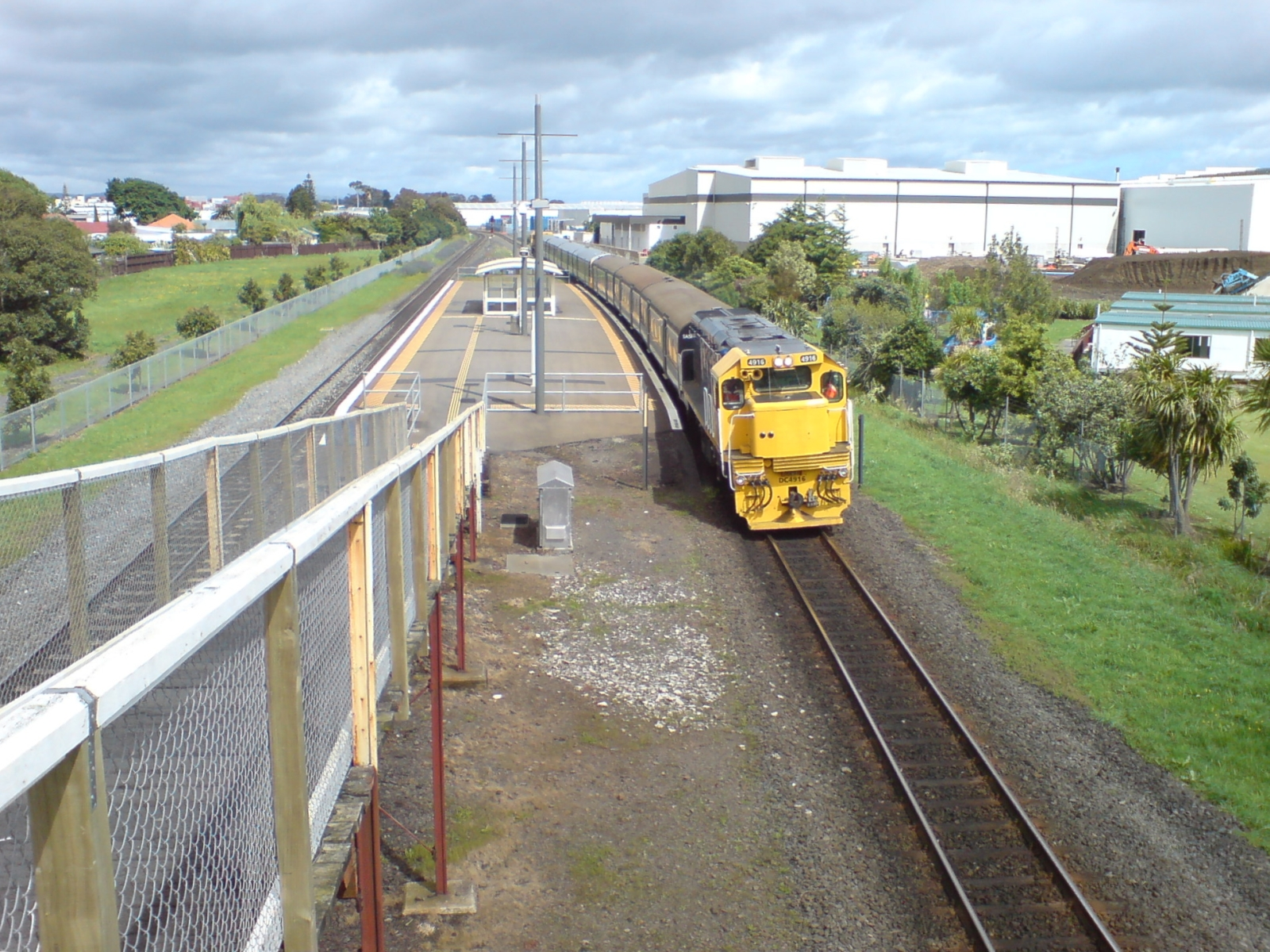
Puhinui Train Station in 2008

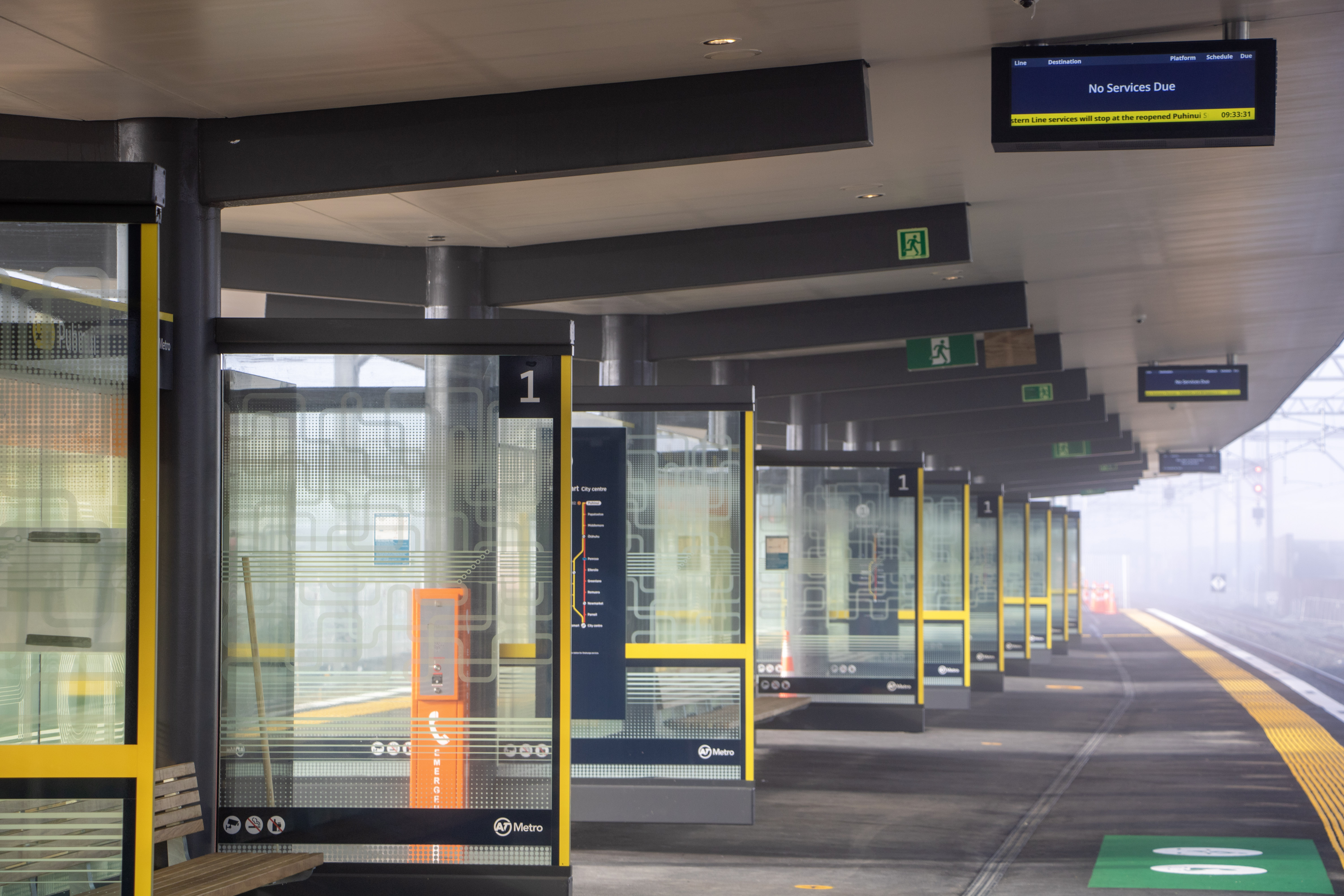
The upgraded station in 2021

The station was opened on 29 June 1925 for passengers. Goods services closed on 12 May 1958. Originally, the name Cambria was suggested for the railway station.

== Services ==
Auckland One Rail, on behalf of Auckland Transport, operates East West line and South City line services.

Te Huia passenger services between Auckland and Hamilton, operated by KiwiRail under contract from the Waikato Regional Council, stop at Puhinui.

Puhinui Station is served by bus routes AirportLink and 37.

== Bus–rail interchange ==
An eastward line from the airport to Botany Downs has also been proposed with a new interchange at Puhinui railway station, planned to be built in two stages, the first of which is said to be an early deliverable component of the Airport to Botany rapid transit line. The redeveloped $69 million Puhinui Station interchange had a public open day on 24 July 2021, with train services resuming on 26 July 2021. This encompasses a new at-grade bus–rail interchange and enhanced station. Buses will still use the existing local road (Bridge Street) to cross the railway line to/from Manukau, along with local traffic.

The second phase provides a rapid transit overbridge across the railway line to provide a more direct and bespoke rapid transit connection. The new rapid transit link will integrate with the new interchange station on the overbridge. The first stage is estimated to cost $59 million to construct. The line will also go through Manukau railway station before ending in Botany.

== See also ==
- List of Auckland railway stations
