= Ōtāhuhu railway station =

Train station in Auckland, New Zealand

Ōtāhuhu
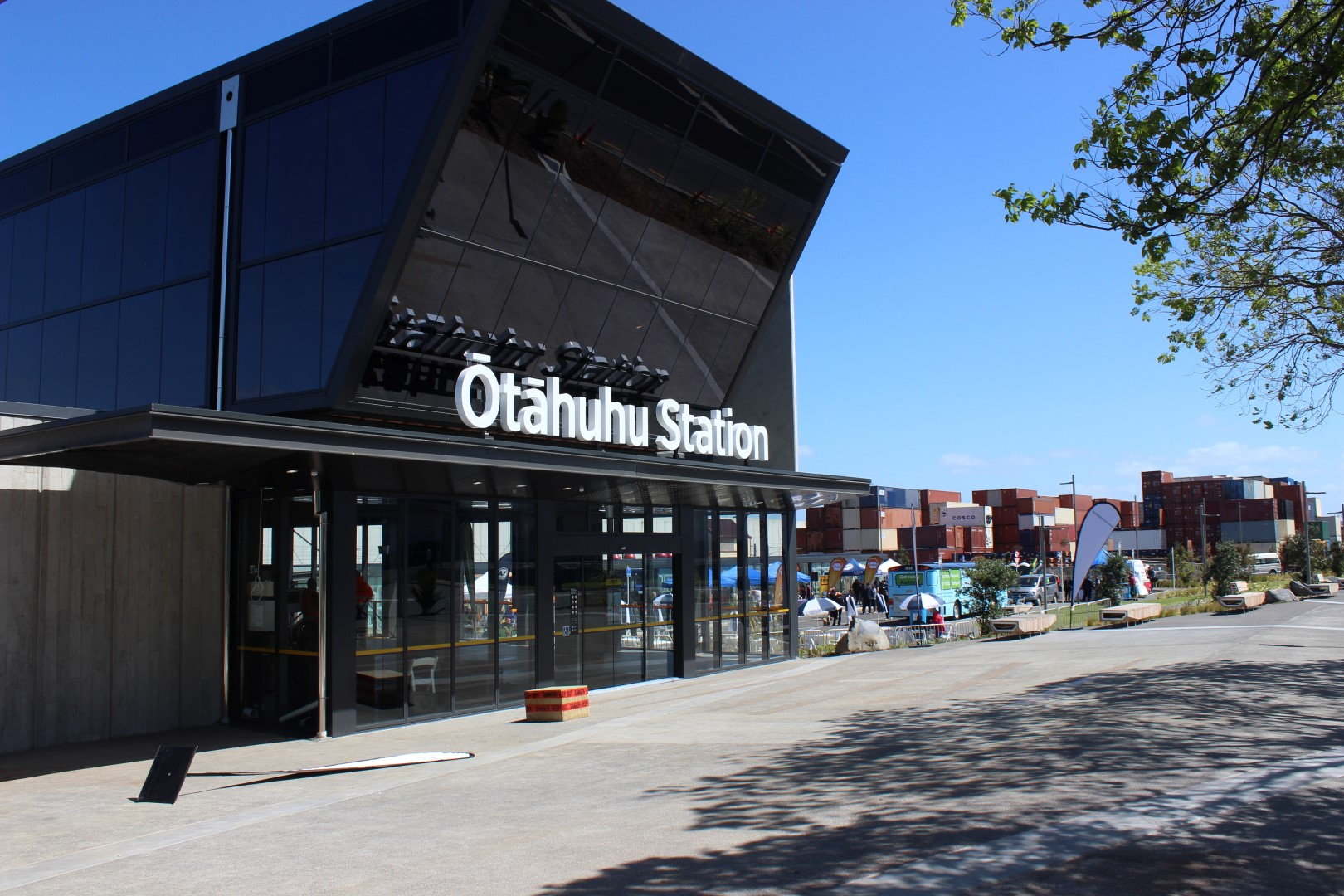
- The main entrance to Ōtāhuhu Station, serving the bus and railway platforms

General information
- Location: Ōtāhuhu, Auckland
- Coordinates: 36°56′50″S 174°50′0″E
- System: Auckland Transport Urban rail
- Owner: KiwiRail (track and platforms); Auckland Transport (buildings)
- Operator: Auckland One Rail
- Line: North Island Main Trunk
- Distance: 664.28 km (412.76 mi) from Wellington
- Platforms: Island platform (P1 & P2); Side platform (P3)
- Tracks: Mainline (3)

Construction
- Parking: Limited
- Cycle facilities: Yes
- Accessible: Yes (Lifts)

Other information
- Fare zone: Isthmus/Northern Manukau (overlap)

History
- Opened: 20 May 1875
- Rebuilt: 29 October 2016
- Electrified: April 2014

Passengers
- 2011: 954 passengers/weekday

Services
Preceding station	Auckland Transport (Auckland One Rail)	Following station
Sylvia Park towards Swanson	East West Line	Middlemore towards Manukau
Middlemore towards Pukekohe	South City Line	Penrose towards Newmarket

Adjacent stations
Preceding station	KiwiRail	Following station
Westfield; Closed 2017	North Island Main Trunk	Mangere; Closed 2011
Location

Ōtāhuhu railway station is located on the East West and South City lines of the Auckland rail network in New Zealand. The station consists of an island platform and side platform and is part of an integrated bus-train major transport hub. It can be reached by steps and lift from an overhead concourse that leads from the adjacent bus transfer station and Walmsley Road.

== History ==
Ōtāhuhu station features a historic, decommissioned signal box and is the point where both freight and passenger trains enter and exit the main line from the Westfield locomotive depot.

The station was opened on 20 May 1875, though the contractors, Brogdens, had marked their completion of the line over a year earlier, by running a special excursion on 27 March 1874. The station served the increasing settlement at Ōtāhuhu, with a road eventually constructed to the station. The station included a goods shed and a main building, which however burned down in 1909 after a fire in the oil room got out of hand with no water supply available to suppress the fires.

=== 2010s Upgrades ===
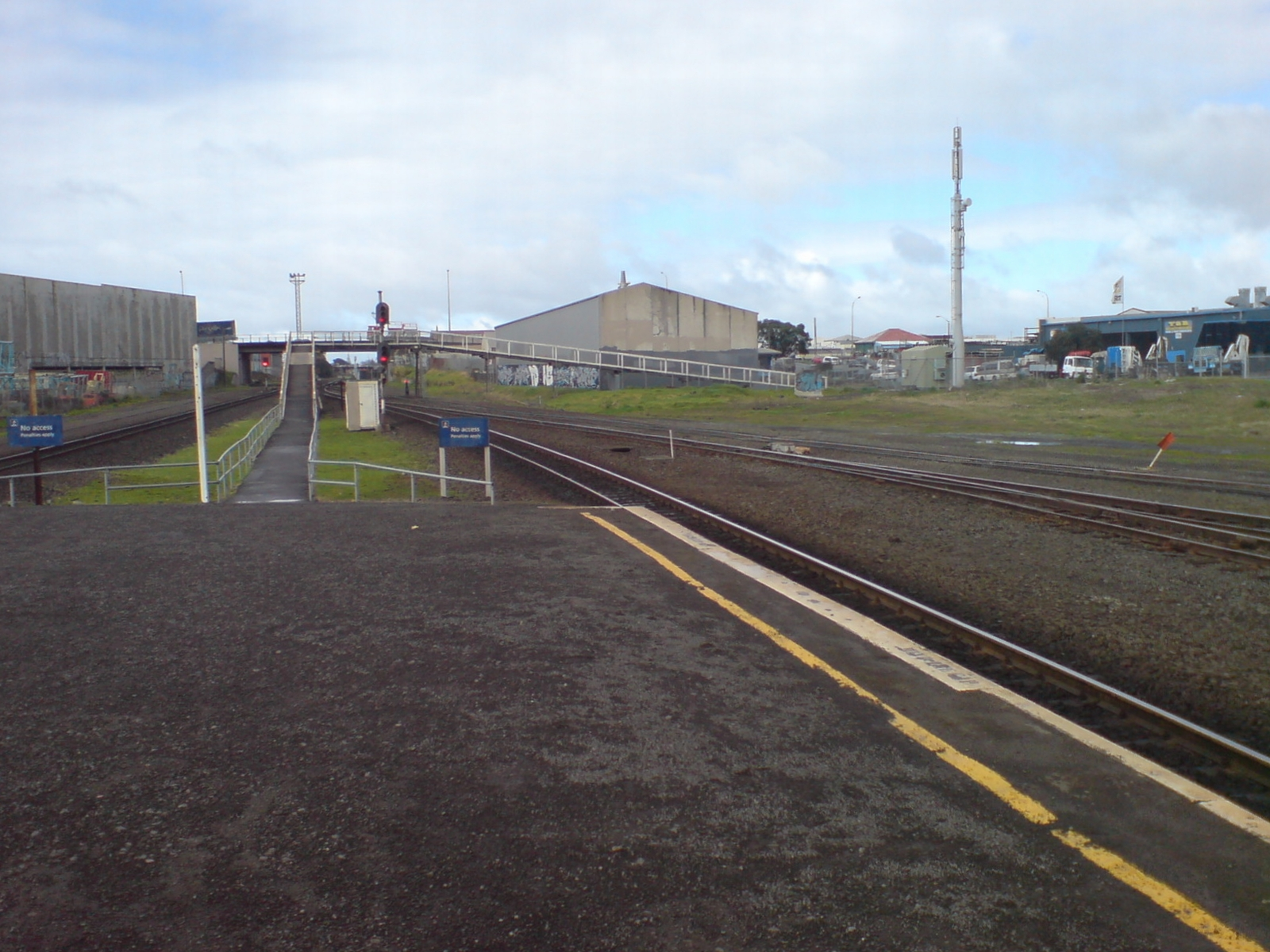
Otahuhu Station before the 2010s upgrades.

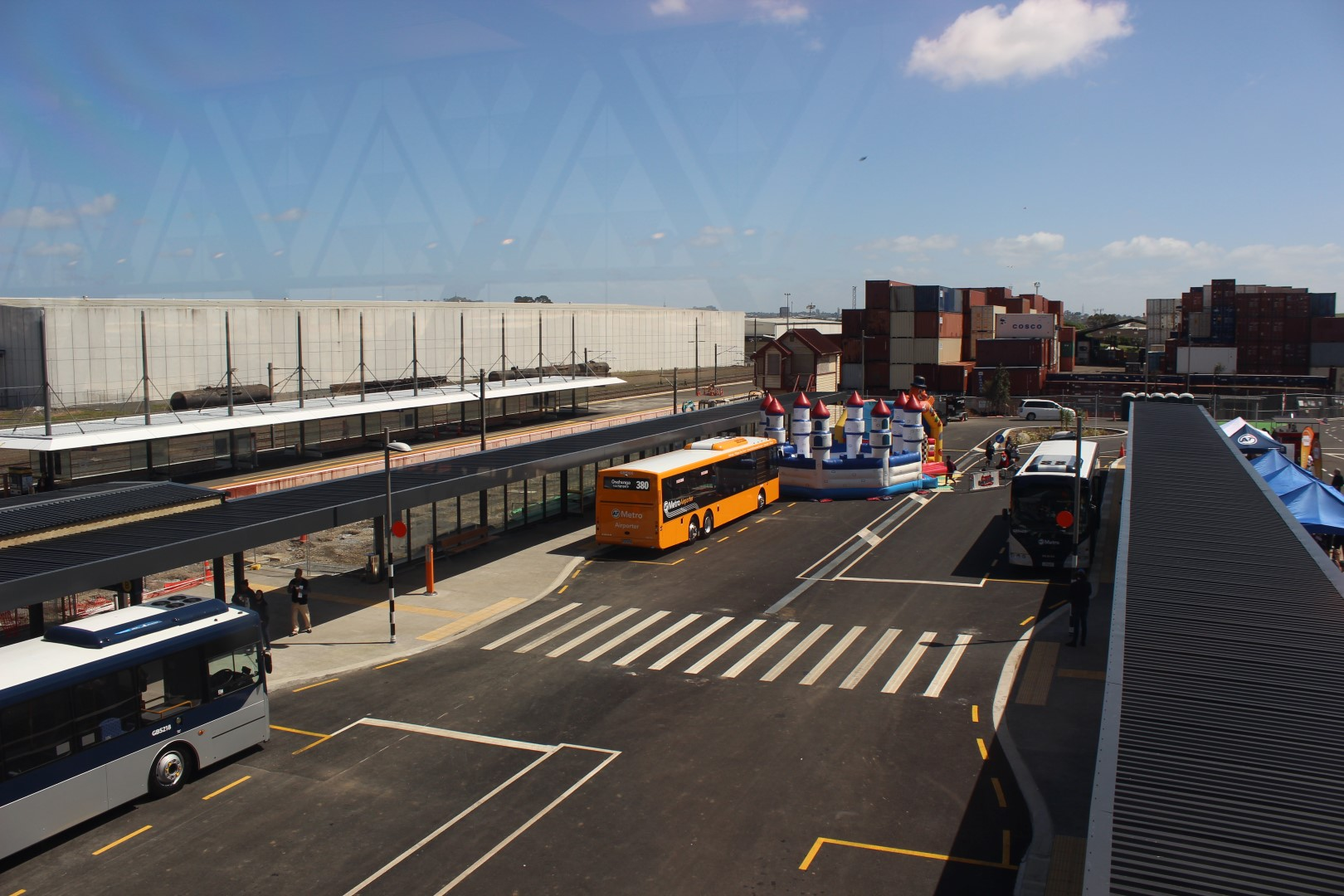
The bus platforms at Ōtāhuhu Station during an open day on 29 October 2016. The railway platforms are behind the left-hand platform in this view.

In May 2011, Auckland Transport and KiwiRail started work to lengthen the platform to accommodate longer passenger trains. The platform area around the signal box was raised and further platform installed around the base of the pedestrian over bridge to Walmsley Road.

In July 2011, the signal box at the station was one of the last to be decommissioned in Auckland, as part of a project to upgrade the signalling of the Auckland suburban network in preparation for electrification. Mainline signalling in the Ōtāhuhu station limits will be operated from the National Train Control Centre (NTCC) in Wellington, along with the rest of the Auckland network.

A new southbound platform, 1.3 km (0.81 mi) of track and four crossovers were opened in December 2020, as part of the City Rail Link works to enable trains to turn back and reduce the need for bus passengers to use the bridge.

=== Bus-train interchange ===
Concern was raised in 2007 about the 1.2 km walk between the station and the nearest bus services, with the station located in an out-of-the-way industrial area. These concerns were addressed by the construction of a bus-train interchange which opened on 29 October 2016.

A public open day was held with station designers in August 2014. Enabling works began in November 2014 after the temporary closure of Titi Street Bridge. The following year (November 2015) main construction works began (building the concourse area and landscaping).

The $28 million bus-train interchange and concourse was completed in October 2016 and was opened on 29 October 2016.

The decommissioned signal box has been retained as a historic feature of the new station.

=== Otahuhu Railway Workshops ===
The Otahuhu Railway Workshops were established in December 1928, replacing the older Newmarket Workshops. They quickly became one of the largest employers in the area, with approximately 1,000 people working there. The facility was primarily responsible for the construction and maintenance of wagons and carriages. Over time, due to restructuring within the New Zealand Railways Corporation, the workshops were progressively closed, with the final closure occurring on 30 June 1992.

== Services ==
Auckland One Rail, on behalf of Auckland Transport, operates South City line and East West line services.

== See also ==
- List of Auckland railway stations
- Public transport in Auckland
