= Helensville railway station =

Defunct railway station in New Zealand

Helensville
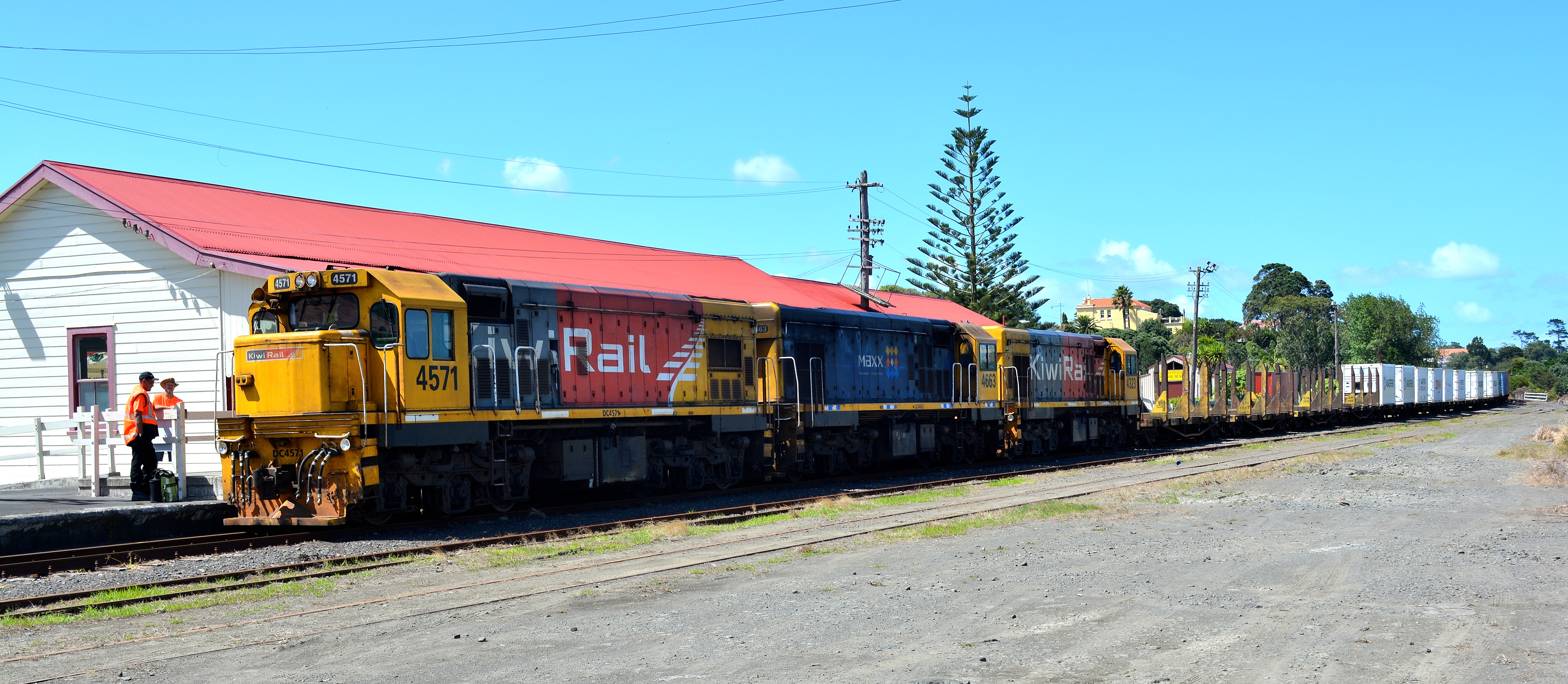

General information
- Location: Railway Street, Helensville, Auckland
- Coordinates: 36.671857°S 174.450484°E
- Elevation: 3 m (9.8 ft)
- Owner: Helensville Railway Station Trust
- Line: North Auckland Line
- Platforms: 1
- Tracks: 3

History
- Opened: 18 July 1881
- Closed: 12 June 1987

Services
Preceding station	Historical railways	Following station
Punganui; Line open, station closed 2.94 km (1.83 mi)	North Auckland Line; NZR	Ohirangi; Line open, station closed 2.68 km (1.67 mi)
Location

Helensville railway station formerly served the town of Helensville, 60.47 km (37.57 mi) northwest of Auckland Strand, in the North Island of New Zealand. It was a stop on the North Auckland Line, and was the next major station north of Waitākere. Occasionally it was called the Helensville North Railway Station.

Though closed in 1987 (reopened from Monday 14 July 2008 to Thursday 24 December 2009), the site still features the 1882 wooden building, which has been restored, and has a shunting yard and KiwiRail Network depot. The platform was modernised in 2007 as part of a trial to reintroduce a commuter train service to Auckland.

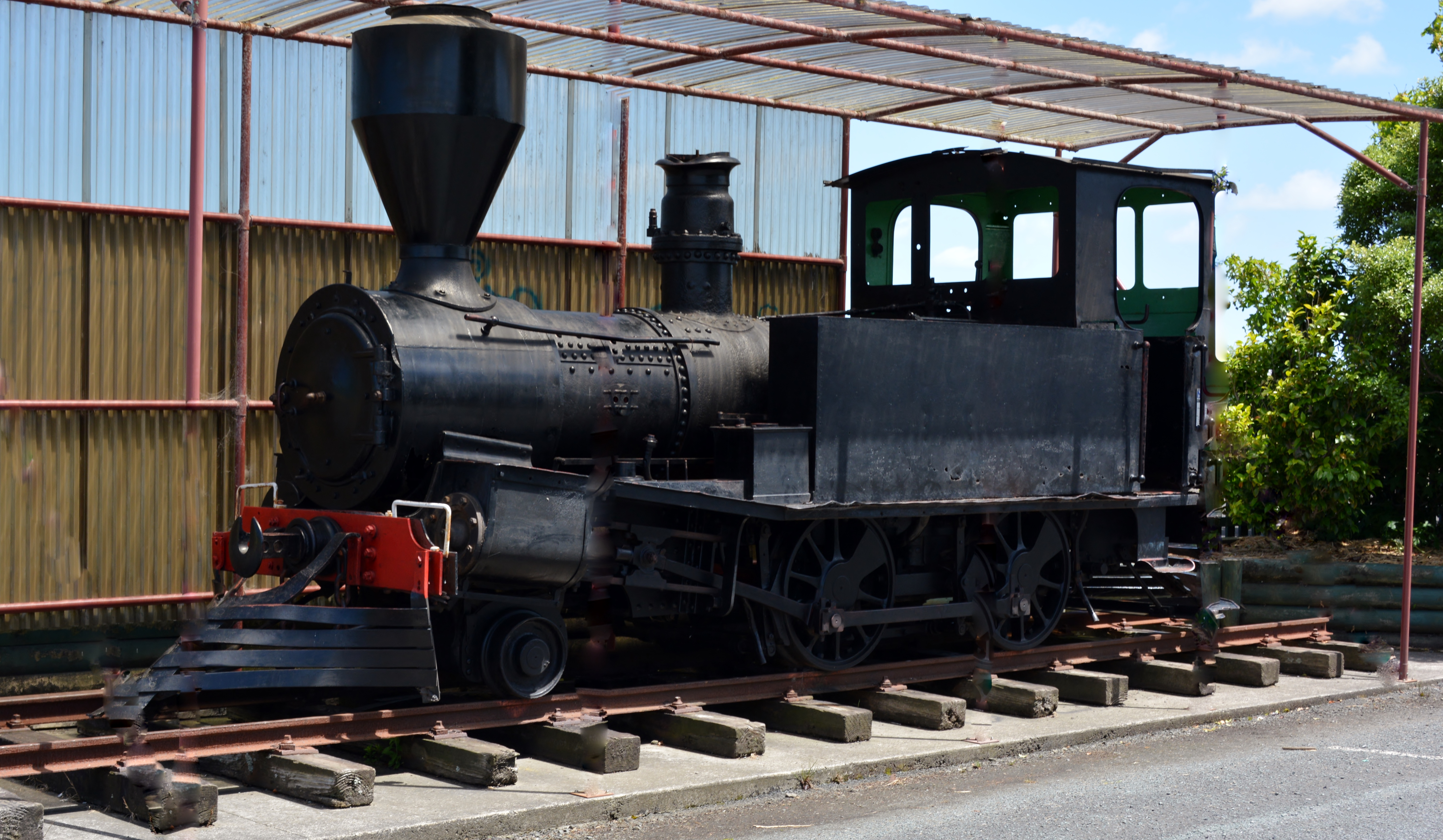
NZR D170 of 1880 on static display

There is an old steam locomotive (an NZR D class), on loan from MOTAT, at the entrance to the platform from the station car park. It worked on NZR until 1923, at Whakatu freezing works until 1960 and was moved to Helensville in 2000. There is also a model railway and museum at the station and a cafe and shop.

As well as the station, three tracks and the engine-turning triangle remain.

== Services ==
The station was closed on 31 July 1967 to passenger traffic to the north, and on 12 June 1987 to all traffic. Floods disrupted commuter services in 1979 and suburban passenger trains were truncated to Waitākere on 30 November 1980.

In June 2007, it was announced that suburban rail services would be extended to Helensville in 2008 for a trial period. Temporary stations opened at Huapai and Waimaukau and Helensville had a minor upgrade. Services to the town resumed on Monday 14 July 2008 after an absence of 28 years and ran until Christmas, on Thursday 24 December 2009. The trial services consisted of a Monday–Friday morning service from Helensville to Auckland's Britomart Transport Centre and evening service from Britomart to Helenville before returning to Britomart. The trains took 93 to 98 minutes, compared with 75 to 120 minutes of 2019 bus schedules.

For some years, special train services were put on between Helensville and Auckland for the Farmers Santa Parade every Christmas season.

== History ==
Helensville had two stations; Helensville South was open from 1875 to 1980 and Helensville from 1881 to 1980.

=== Helensville South ===
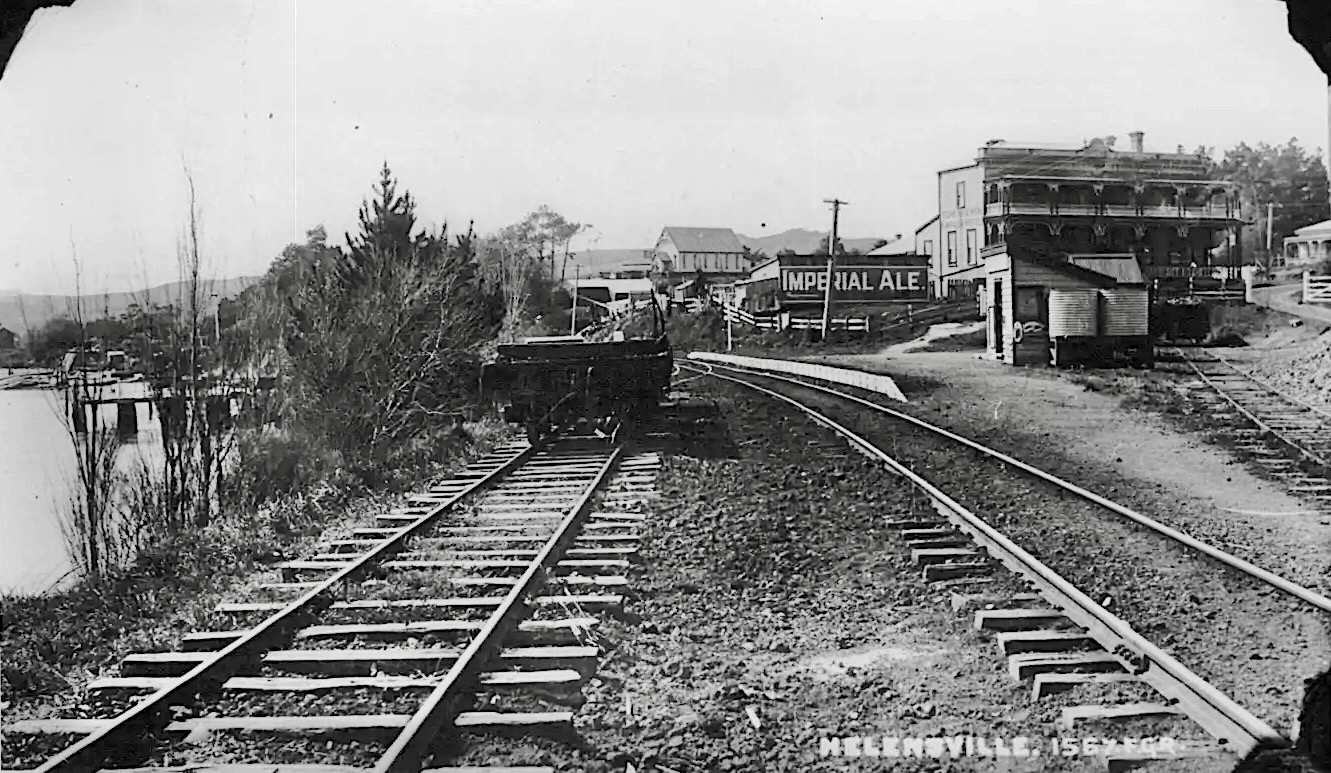
Helensville South in 1909

Helensville South was the original terminus from Thursday, 28 October 1875, when the 16.5 mi (26.6 km) Kaipara – Riverhead line opened, with a daily train each way from Friday, 29 October. It was near Rimu Street, 0.7 km (0.43 mi) south of the later Helensville station. A Kaipara River wharf, accessible only at high tide, was built in 1872 and a goods shed and station house in 1873. Initially journeys were slow, as there was no ballast, sleepers being held only by clay and fern. On 25 July 1876 Helensville South was described as a temporary station. The town grew up close to the old station, so that there was opposition to closing it. In October 1880 a petition asked for a small platform and in July 1881 another petition opposed closure. Therefore, on 9 February 1881, when the new terminus opened, the old Helensville station became Helensville South flag station. A platform was built later that year, a ticket office in 1884, by which time there was also a cart approach, and a shelter shed in 1887. By 1896 there were also urinals and private sidings for Helensville Timber Co and Waitemata County Council, with a siding for Kaipara Dairy added when their factory opened in 1911, on the site of a sawmill. In 1912 a 20-ton weighbridge was added. A light was added in 1921. The Mill Road level crossing was replaced by a bridge in 1938. By 1978 only a shelter shed remained. Both stations lost their passenger trains to the north from 31 July 1967, general goods traffic from 9 July 1978 and Auckland suburban trains from 30 November 1980.

=== Helensville ===
In 1877 a 5th class stationmaster's house and a gatekeeper's house were built and a manager's house added in 1878. By March 1878 the extension from Helensville (later called Helensville South) to Stewart's Flat (later called Helensville) was completed, about £15,000 being spent to extend the line north and build a less tide dependent wharf, which was finished on 20 February 1880, though it wasn't until 9 February 1881 that the extension opened. On Monday, 18 July 1881 the line through to Auckland opened. A Post Office was at the station from 1 August 1881 to 1887 and from 1 May 1895 to 1 March 1911. The station building was completed by January 1882 and cattle pens and sidings planned. By 1884 there was a special station, platform, cart approach, 60 ft (18 m) x 30 ft (9.1 m) goods shed, crane, coal bunker, engine shed, stationmaster's house, urinals and cattle yards. After 8 years as a terminus, the line was extended 9.36 km (5.82 mi) to Kaukapakapa on Friday, 3 May 1889. A verandah was added in 1893, a weighbridge in 1897 and a turntable in 1911, which was replaced by the triangle in 1942. From 1910 to the 1940s there was a refreshment room at the station. In 1927 the station, platform and dining room were increased in size and moved east, to ease a curve. In 1964 there was a fire in the locomotive shed. The station building had its chimney stacks removed after the 1970s.
