= Manukau railway station =

Railway station in New Zealand

Manukau
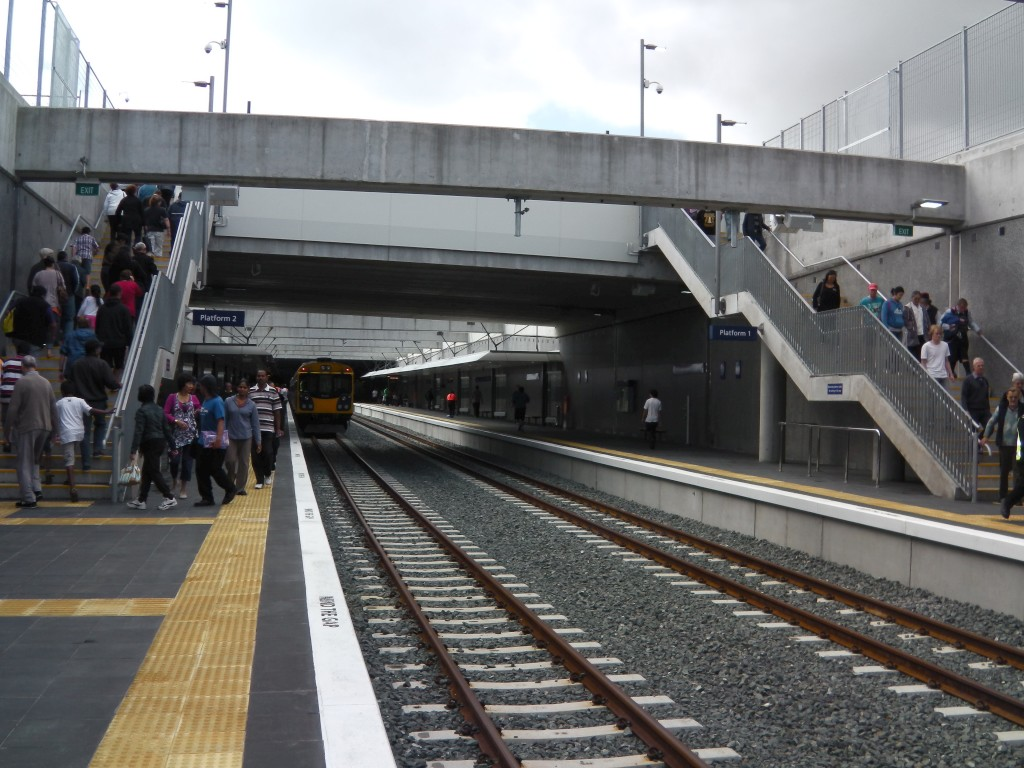
- The trenched approach to Manukau station, seen from the west.

General information
- Location: Manukau Station Road, Manukau; New Zealand
- Coordinates: 36°59′39″S 174°52′37″E
- System: Auckland Transport Urban rail
- Owner: KiwiRail (track and platforms); Auckland Transport (infrastructure)
- Operator: Auckland One Rail
- Line: Manukau Branch
- Platforms: Side platforms (P1 & P2)
- Tracks: 2

Construction
- Structure type: Trench
- Platform levels: 1
- Parking: No
- Cycle facilities: Yes
- Accessible: Yes (Lifts)

Other information
- Status: Open
- Station code: MNK
- Fare zone: Northern Manukau/Southern Manukau (overlap)

History
- Opened: 15 April 2012

Passengers
- 1,650 daily per weekday (April 2018)

Services
Preceding station	Auckland Transport (Auckland One Rail)	Following station
Puhinui towards Swanson	East West Line	Terminus
Location

Manukau railway station is a major railway station in Manukau, a suburb of Auckland, New Zealand, and located in the campus of the Manukau Institute of Technology.

It is the terminus station for East West Line services between Manukau and Swanson in west Auckland. Access from the station to ground level and to surrounding streets is by stairs, lift or escalator to the ground floor of the 7-level campus building.

== History ==
Station works were essentially finished by October 2011, and the Manukau Branch line, a 2.5 km spur line off the North Island Main Trunk railway, opened on 15 April 2012. Manukau station is the only station on the branch line.

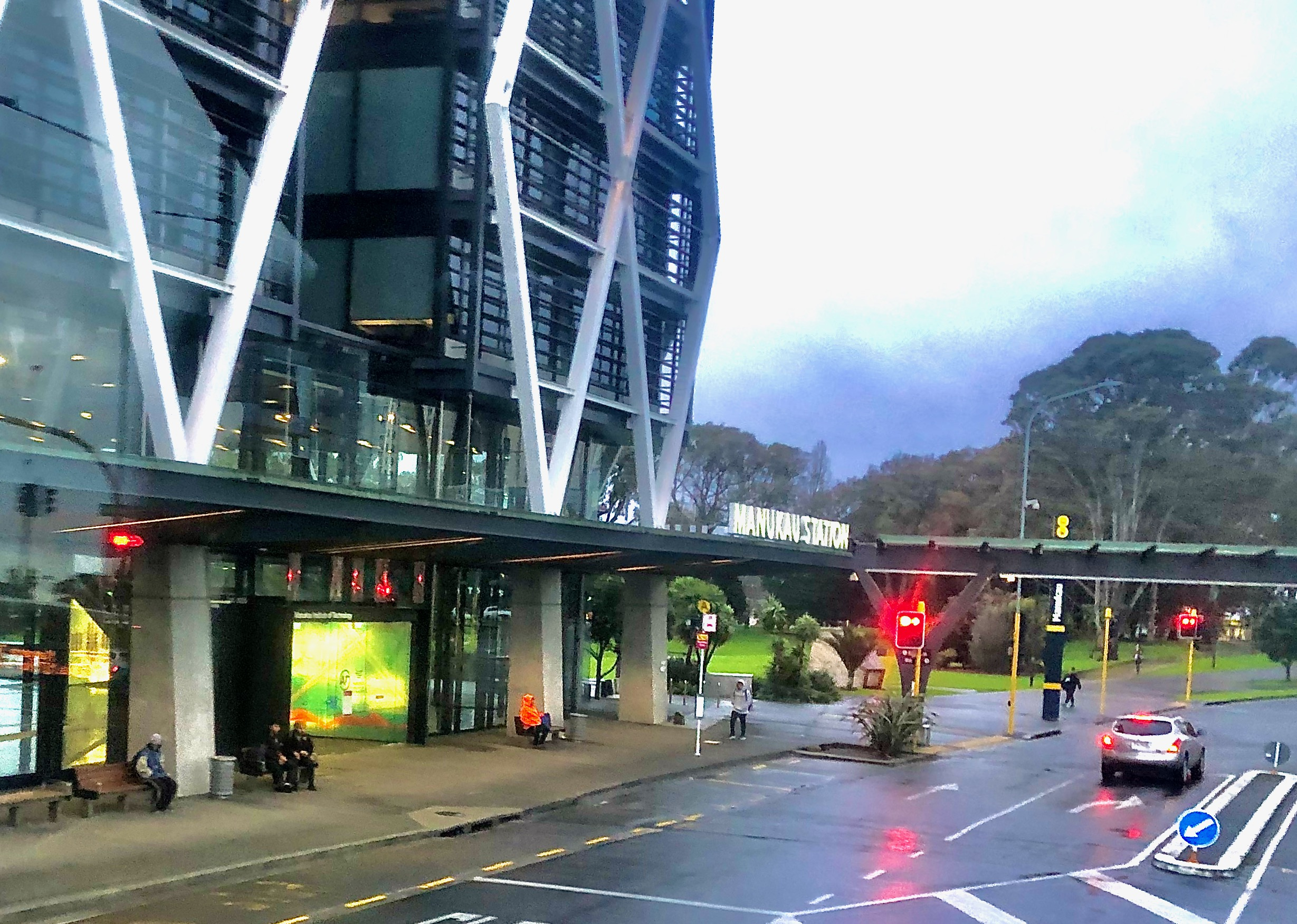
Manukau railway station in 2021

The Eastern Line was the second passenger rail line in Auckland to receive electric train services, following the Onehunga Line in April 2014. Electric trains began running on some Eastern Line off-peak services on 15 August 2014, and were gradually rolled out onto all services over the following month.

In December 2014, all trains using the Eastern Line began terminating at Manukau rather than alternating between Manukau and Papakura. Similarly, all Southern Line trains began terminating at Papakura or Pukekohe.

In April 2018, Manukau was the 11th busiest train station on the Auckland network with an average of 1,650 passengers on a typical weekday.

== Services ==
Auckland One Rail, on behalf of Auckland Transport, operates East West Line services to Swanson via City Centre.

== Bus station ==
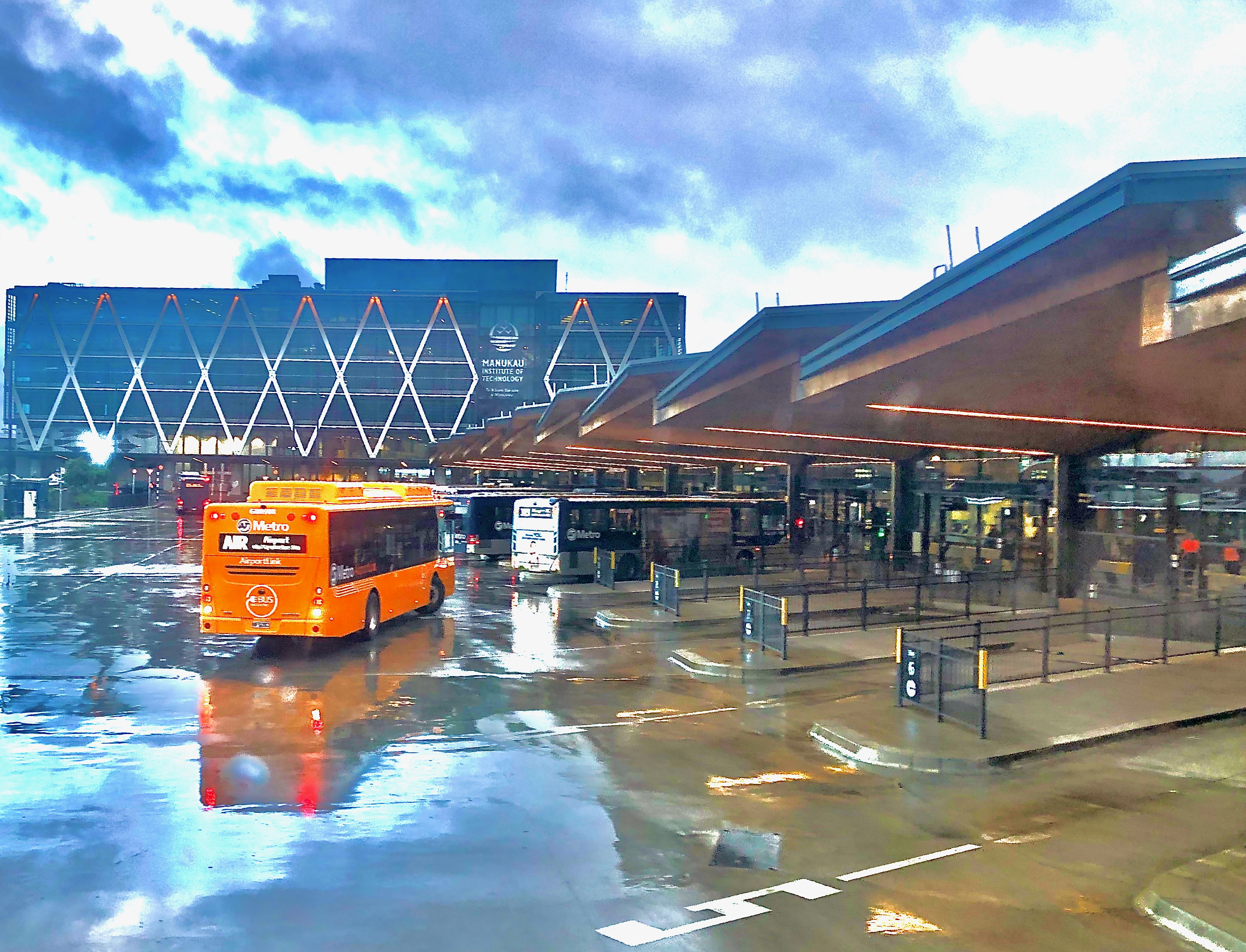
Manukau bus station, with the railway station in the background in 2021

In 2016, work began on the 23-bay Manukau bus station adjacent to the train station. It was officially opened on 7 April 2018, and bus services from the facility began the following day.

== See also ==
- List of Auckland railway stations
- Public transport in Auckland
