= Tironui railway station =

Defunct railway station in Auckland, New Zealand

Tironui
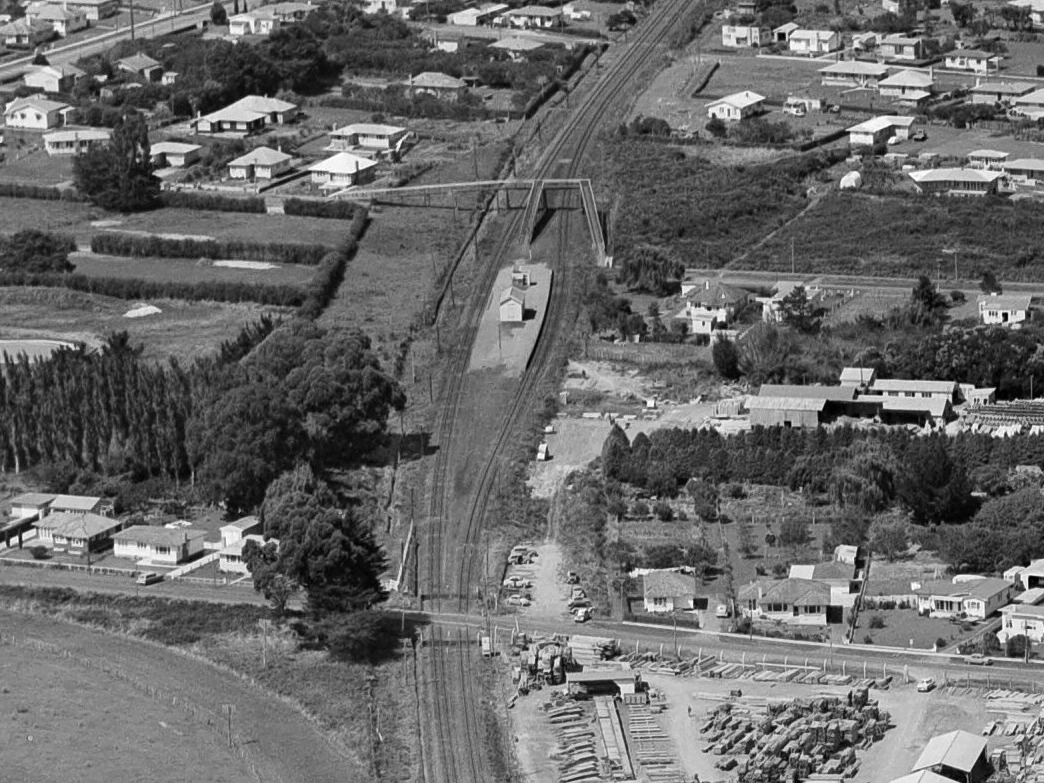
- Aerial photograph of Tironui Railway Station in 1963

General information
- Location: Takanini, Auckland; New Zealand
- Line: North Island Main Trunk
- Distance: 649 km (403 mi) from Wellington
- Platforms: Island platform (removed)
- Tracks: Mainline (2)

History
- Opened: 10 May 1926
- Closed: 13 August 1983

Adjacent stations
Preceding station	KiwiRail	Following station
Takanini	North Island Main Trunk	Papakura
Location

Tironui railway station was a station on the North Island Main Trunk in New Zealand, south of Auckland between Takanini railway station and Papakura railway station. It had a station building and a 92 m (302 ft) long, 42 cm (17 in) high platform. It was opened on 10 May 1926 and closed on 13 August 1983.

The New Zealand Ministry for Culture and Heritage gives a translation of "expansive view" for Tironui, (tiro=look or view, nui=suffix meaning large).

== History ==
The railway through the area was opened on 20 May 1875, as part of the Auckland and Mercer Railway. On 6 November 1908 the line became part of the North Island Main Trunk, with services reaching Wellington.

Following its proposal in 1923, the station at Tironui opened on 10 May 1926 as a request stop. Puhinui, Homai, and Te Mahia stations opened at about the same time to cater for the expansion of Auckland's southern suburbs.

Duplication of the tracks between Papatoetoe and Papakura started in 1929 as an employment relief scheme. On 29 March 1931 the second track between Papatoetoe and Papakura opened.

During World War II, the station was used for transport to and from the nearby Papakura Mobilisation Camp, with additional trains operating for men on weekend leave and special trains for troop movements. In November 1939, 700 soldiers of the 18th Battalion moved from Hopuhopu Camp. They travelled by train to Tironui before marching to the camp.

By 1940 electric light had been added to the station. As part of a scheme for lighting roads around the military camp an additional light was added to the station in 1941.

The platform had a general waiting room, ladies’ waiting room, and men’s convenience. The station building was removed on 10 August 1971.

The New Zealand Railways Corporation was established on 1 April 1982 with the major objective of running operations on a more commercial basis. Tironui station was closed to all traffic on 13 August 1983.

A bridge provided access to the station platform from Tironui Station Road East on one side and Tironui Station Road West on the other. Following the station's closure, the ramp connecting the bridge to the platform was removed, and the bridge was subsequently removed in October 1990.

To improve safety the level crossing was removed in February 2024.

== Proposed re-opening ==
There have been several proposals to create new stations at or near the old Tironui station site in order to provide public transport access to the new Addison residential development and Southgate shopping centre.

In 2007, a proposal was made by the former Papakura District Council to create a new station and park and ride facility (named Glenora) near the old Tironui station, on the other side of Walters road.

In 2012, the Papakura Local Board requested a new station and park and ride be built at Walters Road. This proposal was listed in Auckland Transport's draft land transport plan.

In 2015, Auckland Transport agreed to investigation of a potential station site at Tironui, which could be opened if growth requires it. Auckland Transport confirmed that it does not support the previously proposed Glenora station and recommended that, if an additional rail station is required in the area to meet transport demand and growth, that station should be located at Tironui. Other potential new rail stations looked at were Paerātā, Drury and Drury West.

== See also ==
- List of Auckland railway stations
