= Opaheke railway station =

Defunct railway station in Auckland, New Zealand

Opaheke
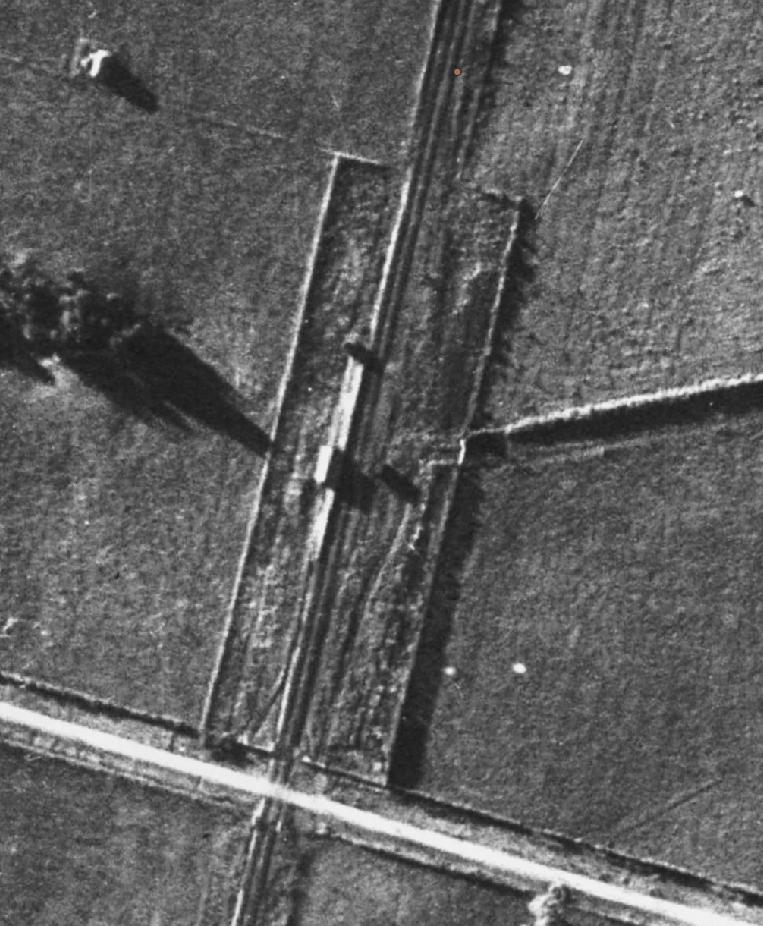
- Excerpt from orthophotomosaic captured 1942–1954

General information
- Location: New Zealand
- Line: North Island Main Trunk
- Tracks: 2

History
- Opened: 20 May 1875
- Closed: 13 November 1955
- Former names: Hunua until 7 January 1912

Services
Preceding station	Historical railways	Following station
Papakura; Line open, station open 4.12 km (2.56 mi)	North Island Main Trunk; KiwiRail	Drury; Line open, station closed 2.9 km (1.8 mi)
Location

Opaheke railway station was a flag station serving Ōpaheke on the North Island Main Trunk in New Zealand. It was opened in 1875 as the Hunua railway station, renamed in 1912, then closed in 1955.

On the opening day Hunua was described as a small wayside station. The station was first listed in the December 1875 timetable, being served by 2 trains a day, taking 92 minutes for the 21 mi (34 km) journey from the Auckland railway terminus.

== History ==
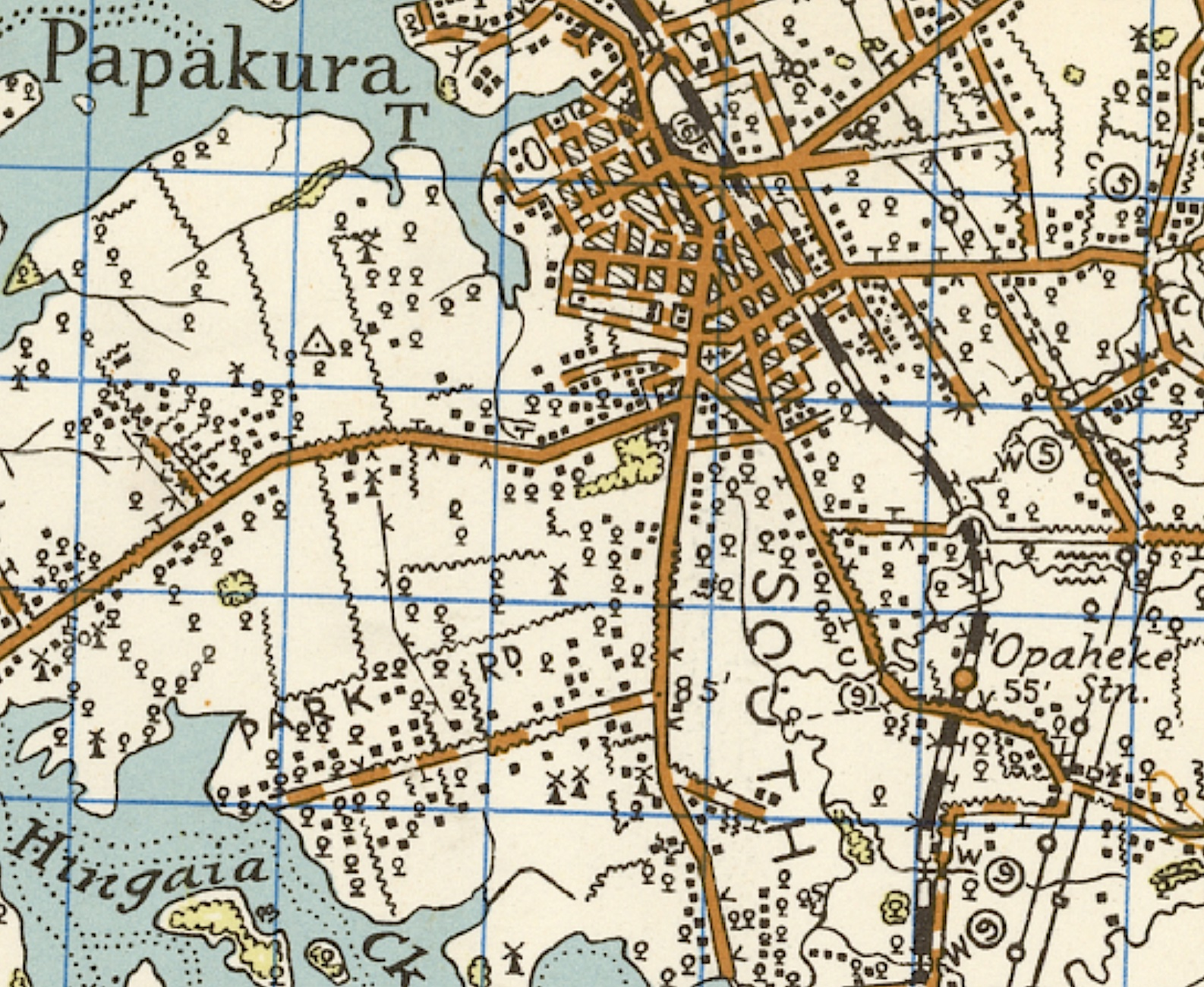
Excerpt from 1956 topographical map.

Hunua opened on 20 May 1875, as part of the Auckland and Mercer Railway, built by Brogden & Co, when it was extended from Penrose.

It was a very small sixth class station, with a shelter shed (20 ft (6.1 m) by 9 ft (2.7 m)). By 1884 there was a passenger platform with cart approach and a loading bank.

In 1894 there was a petition for a goods shed to be built. In 1891 the Coultland Brothers obtained permission to lay a tramway from the station. A suggestion was made in 1899 that a tramway could be laid between the station and the Hūnua coal seams. However, it seems that the Hunua Colliery only used road transport to get its coal to the railway at Papakura.

The station was renamed to Opaheke on 7 January 1912.

Duplication of the tracks between Papakura and Paerātā was completed on 3 December 1939.

Across the road from the station the Opaheke Saleyards were opened in 1955, with the first sales held on 15 February.

After closure on 13 November 1955, the station building was damaged by fire on 3 May 1956 and the rest offered for sale in May 1963.

== See also ==
List of Auckland railway stations
