= Sth =

Sth is an abbreviation of something. STH or sth may also refer to:

- STH (gene), a human gene
- S.T.H., or Straight To Hell, a gay pornography zine
- Saint Helena, IIGA country code
- Saint Helena, Ascension and Tristan da Cunha, UNDP country code
- Season ticket holder, someone who has purchased a season ticket
- Secretary for Transport and Housing, of the Government of Hong Kong
- Soil-transmitted helminth, a type of parasitic worm
- Soil-transmitted helminthiasis, caused by soil-transmitted helminths
- Somatotropin hormone, or growth hormone
- Sonic the Hedgehog
- Southern Line (Auckland) (timetable code: STH), New Zealand
- Super Treasure Hunt, a designation used on the highly collectible Hot Wheels models
