= Papakura railway station =

Train station in Auckland, New Zealand

Papakura
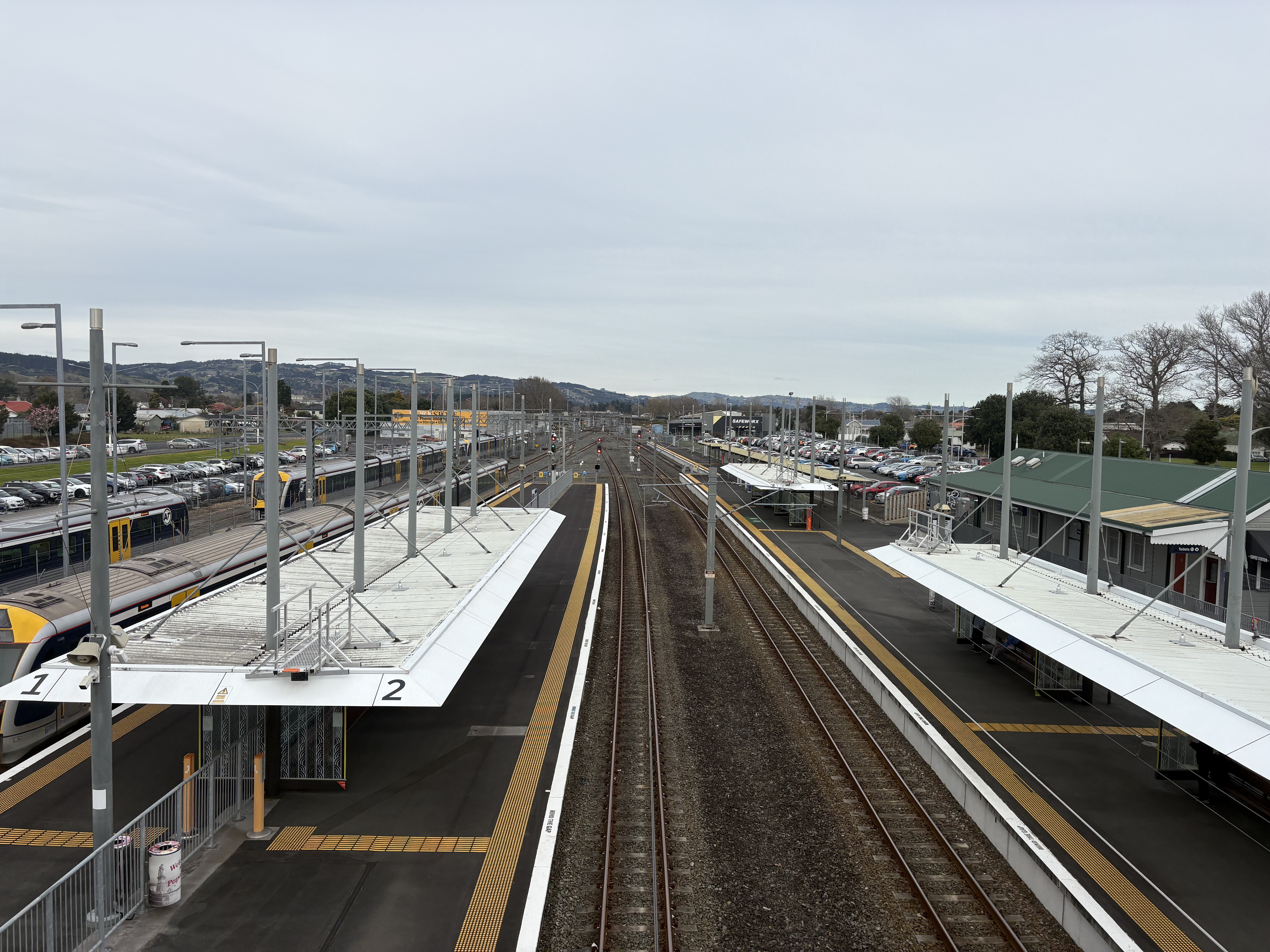
- Papakura railway station in 2025

General information
- Location: Papakura, Auckland; New Zealand
- Coordinates: 37.0642°S 174.9461°E
- Elevation: 19 m (62 ft)
- System: Auckland Transport Urban rail
- Owner: KiwiRail (track and platforms); Auckland Transport (buildings)
- Operator: Auckland One Rail
- Line: North Island Main Trunk
- Distance: 647.02 km (402.04 mi) from Wellington
- Platforms: Island platform (P1 & P2); Side platform (P3); Bay platform (P4)
- Tracks: Mainline (3); Passing loop (1); Backshunt (1, south-east); Bay platform (1)

Construction
- Parking: Yes
- Cycle facilities: Yes
- Accessible: Yes (Lifts)

Other information
- Fare zone: Southern Manukau

History
- Opened: 20 May 1875; 151 years ago
- Rebuilt: 2013
- Electrified: 2014

Passengers
- 2018: 1,196,814 passengers

Services
Preceding station	Auckland Transport (Auckland One Rail)	Following station
Drury towards Pukekohe	South City Line	Takaanini towards Newmarket
Preceding station	Great Journeys New Zealand	Following station
Auckland Strand towards Auckland Strand	Northern Explorer	Hamilton towards Wellington

Former services
Preceding station	KiwiRail	Following station
Tironui Line open, station closed 1.93 km (1.20 mi) towards Waitematā	North Island Main Trunk	Opaheke Line open, station closed 4.12 km (2.56 mi) towards Wellington
Track layout
Location

Papakura railway station is a station of the Auckland railway network located in Papakura, New Zealand. It is situated on the North Island Main Trunk and is served by the South City line. It is accessed from Railway Street West and Ron Keat Drive.

== History ==
The station, built by Brogden & Co, opened on 20 May 1875 as part of the Auckland and Mercer Railway which was extended from Penrose. On 2 October 1874, a deputation asked for the contractor to run trains from Penrose to Papakura. Some services were available from October 1874 such as excursion trains to Drury that month.

Initially, Papakura was served by 2 trains a day, increasing to 3 trains a day in 1878. The fastest journey to 1hr 9mins for the 19 mi (31 km) from Auckland. Papakura became the terminus of an improved suburban service in 1913. WAB Class locomotives were introduced to suburban services in 1922, but the coaching stock appears from photos to have been unchanged in 1966. With double tracking, suburban trains were sped up in 1931, the fastest taking 49 minutes. Suburban Sunday trains at low fares were introduced in 1933. From 1938 to 1950 many trains carried troops to and from the Military Camp. Trains calling at Papakura have included: The Overlander, Northerner (in 1975 the platform was extended to 200 m (660 ft) for the Northerner), Northern Explorer, Silver Fern (from 19 September 1977), Waikato Connection, Geyserland Express, Thames Express (from 1921), Taneatua Express and Kaimai Express.

Plantations were established near many railway stations for beautification and, possibly, to provide timber for railway construction. Papakura's railway reserve was planted in 1883, with oaks and blue gums, and was protected in 1935. It was renamed Massey Park in 1939. Some of the trees remain.

By 1884, Papakura had a 4th class station, platform, cart approach, 60 ft (18 m) by 30 ft (9.1 m) goods shed (extended by 80 ft (24 m) in 1921), loading bank, cattle yards, stationmaster's house, urinals and a passing loop for 37 wagons (extended to 70 in 1905). From 1882 to 1913 a Post Office was run by railway staff. In 1885 the station was moved 4 ch (80 m) to the other side of the line. A verandah was added in 1905, sheep yards in 1911 and an engine shed between 1913 and 1917.

In 1920, the first sod was turned for a new station. In 1921 a new yard came into use, with a siding capacity of 450 wagons, together with an island platform, station building, a 55 ft (17 m) turntable replaced by one of 18.9 m (62 ft) by 1988) and several railway houses. By 1922 only the overhead footbridges were unfinished and the old building was being removed. Electric replaced oil lamps in 1926. With increasing suburban traffic, work started in 1938 on a new ticket office, carpark, bridge and platform. On 9 September 1940 a new 400 ft (120 m) suburban platform on the west of the station was brought into use. The station building was again rebuilt in 1983.

Tablet instruments were installed in 1904, fixed signals in 1905, distant signals in 1916 and electric interlocked signalling in 1927.

Duplication of the tracks between Papatoetoe and Papakura started in 1929 as an employment relief scheme and was completed on 29 March 1931. Doubling between Papakura and Paerātā was completed on 3 December 1939.

On 3 November 1986, Papakura closed to goods traffic, but re-opened temporarily in 1987 to take glass for recycling.

Second-hand diesel multiple units were introduced in 1993, purchased for the Auckland rail system from Perth. Nearly all stations were modified to accommodate the lack of external steps. Papakura had timber platforms installed which sat over the original platform.

An official park and ride was built and opened in October 2004 by the Papakura District Council. In 2009, a $2 pay and display "security charge" was introduced for cars using the facility. This was later discontinued.

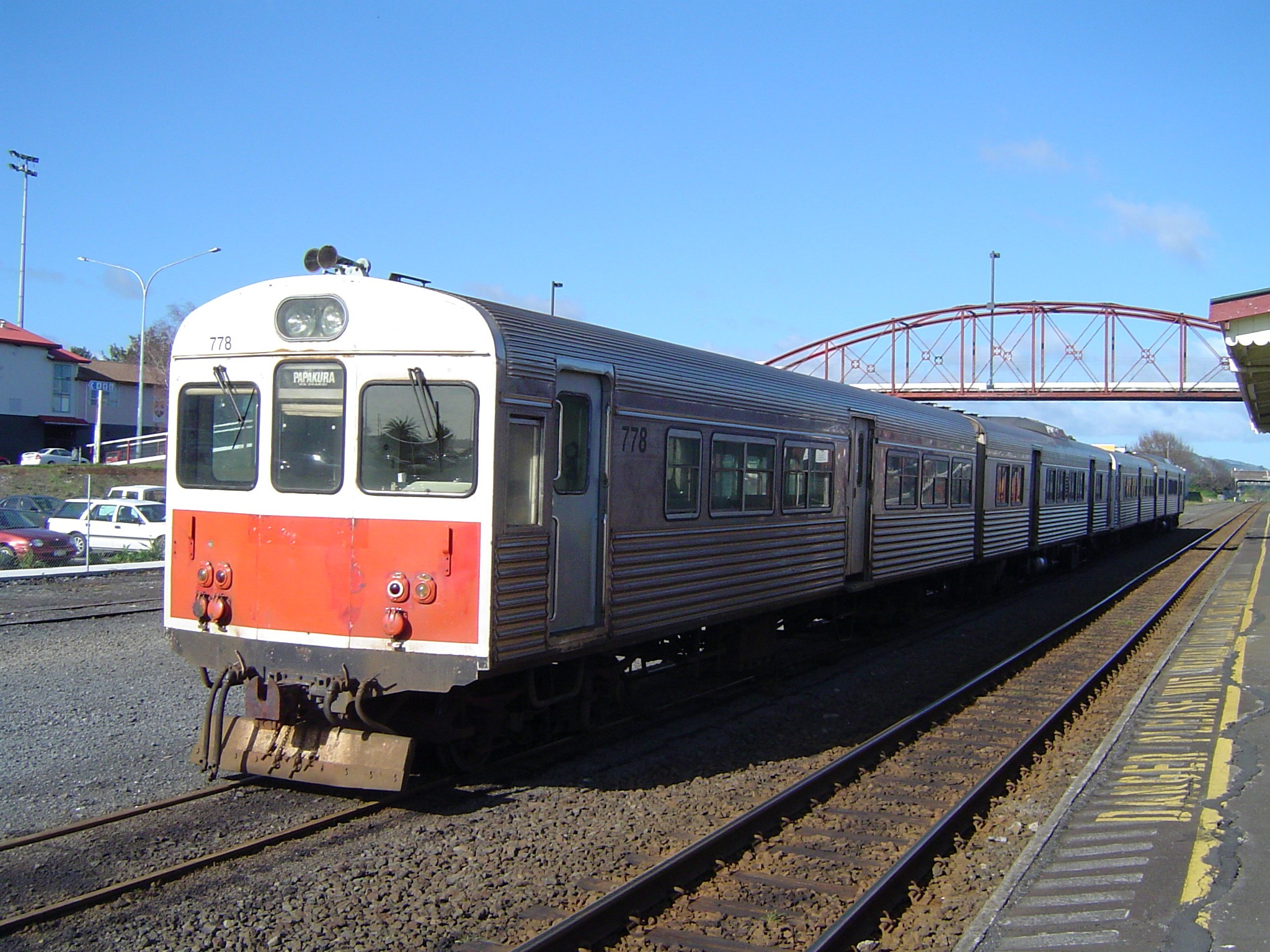
An ADK/ADB class diesel multiple unit at Papakura in 2005. The bowstring footbridge is in the background.

Prior to October 2012, the station had an island platform between the main lines, complete with original wooden station building and signal panel, and a suburban side platform to the west. It had a bowstring footbridge connecting the platforms, which dated from at least the 1930s, constructed of old railway iron and sleepers.

Prior to December 2014, Eastern Line trains terminated at Papakura. After the opening of Manukau railway station in 2012, Eastern Line trains alternated between terminating at Manukau and Papakura. This stopped in December 2014 when all Eastern Line trains began terminating at Manukau after the introduction of new timetables.

== Upgrades ==
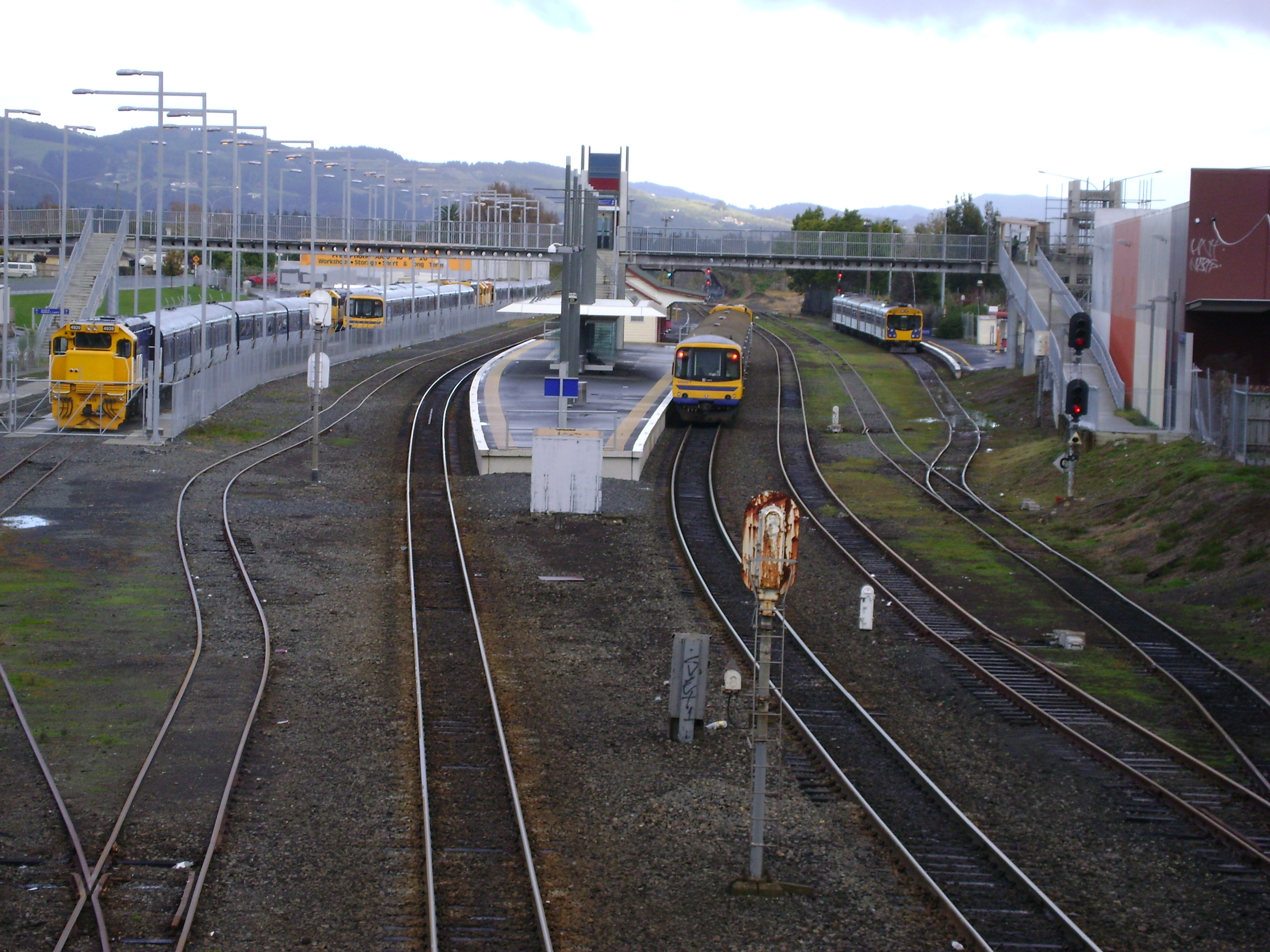
The station in 2009.

In 2007, the island platform was extended to the north, and new shelters were installed. Sidings were commissioned at the east of the station yard for stabling trains overnight. Platforms were lengthened to enable six-car trains because of anticipated growth in passenger numbers; in 2007, approximately 3,000 people passed through each day, and another thousand were anticipated to use the station within five years. The new station was the seventh station to be redeveloped by ARTA in 2007. In January 2009 the heritage footbridge was demolished and scrapped, despite some local opposition, and replaced with a concrete bridge with two passenger lifts. The upgrade cost NZ$4.9 million and was paid for as part of the Auckland Regional Transport Authority's (ARTA) system-wide upgrade of stations.

In 2012–2013, KiwiRail funded a significant upgrade as part of the Auckland railway electrification project to provide resiliency for suburban trains and freight trains heading south. The signalling was completely replaced; the signal panel had been commissioned over 80 years ago. The heritage station building was relocated to the western suburban platform, Platform 3, on 11 August 2012. The building was refurbished and restored, and contains the preserved signal panel on display, a ticket office, public toilets and space for a coffee kiosk. The North Island Main Trunk was slewed to the east, with the island Platforms 1 and 2 adjacent to the up main line to Auckland, typically serving suburban trains from Britomart to Pukekohe. The western suburban platform, Platform 3, was lengthened and a new bay platform, Platform 4, at its southern extremity was constructed to serve DMU shuttles to Pukekohe until 2022 when construction for electrification to Pukekohe began.

Bus stops are directly outside the ticket office, with the old bus stops on the station side of Railway Street West now only used for intercity services, and "rail buses" that operate when the railway network is shut down.

== Facilities ==
Papakura has two park & ride facilities located on Railway Street West and Ron Keat Drive. There are 230 car parks (including mobility parking).

A bike parking shed is also located in the Railway Street West car park.

Station lifts allow access to the footbridge and the platforms.

Public toilets are also located at the station. They can be found in the station building and near the park & ride facility on Ron Keat Drive.

An EMU depot is located on the eastern side of the station. An office for the station controller and Auckland One Rail staff is also located at the Papakura depot.

== Services ==
Papakura is located in the Southern Manukau fare zone.

Auckland One Rail, on behalf of Auckland Transport, operates South City line services to Newmarket and Pukekohe.

== See also ==
- List of Auckland railway stations
- Public transport in Auckland
