= Ngākōroa railway station =

Train station in Auckland, New Zealand

Ngākōroa

General information
- Other names: Drury West
- Location: Ngākōroa, Drury West, Auckland, New Zealand
- Coordinates: 37.1229°S 174.9357°E
- System: Auckland Transport Urban rail
- Owner: KiwiRail (track and platforms); Auckland Transport (buildings)
- Operator: Auckland One Rail
- Line: North Island Main Trunk
- Platforms: Side platforms (P1 & P2)
- Tracks: Mainline (2)

Other information
- Fare zone: Southern Manukau
- Website: KiwiRail

History
- Opened: 2027 (planned)

Services
Preceding station	Auckland Transport (Auckland One Rail)	Following station
Paerātā towards Pukekohe	South City Line	Drury towards Newmarket
Location

Ngākōroa railway station (formerly under the placeholder name Drury West railway station) is a railway station under construction in Auckland, New Zealand. It is due to open in 2027 as part of the Auckland railway electrification project. It will serve the Drury West and Runciman area, linking with new housing developments in the area. The station will be located on the existing rail line, about 450 m south of the existing intersection of State Highway 22/Karaka Road and Jesmond Road. In 2023 KiwiRail won a court case about objections from a developer to the location of the station.

== History ==
As part of the New Zealand Upgrade Programme, Jacinda Ardern's government announced $371 million in funding towards the electrification of track from Papakura to Pukekohe, and a separate $247 million towards the construction of two new stations in Drury Central and Drury West. This was later expanded to include a third station at Paerata.

Planning consent was granted for the Drury Central and Paerata stations in February 2022, with further work being undertaken to gain approval for the Drury West station.

The new stations have attracted criticism from public transport advocates, who say that they are too designed for auto-dependency.

In May 2022, KiwiRail and Auckland Transport announced proposed names for the three stations, replacing the placeholder names. These names were gifted by mana whenua, in order to restore the original Māori language names of the area. The placeholder name of Drury West was replaced by Ngaakooroa, after the station's proximity to the Ngākōroa stream.

In August 2022, the New Zealand Geographic Board returned its verdict on the name, rejecting the use of double vowels as preferred by the Mana Whenua Forum, and instead recommending the name 'Ngākōroa', in line with national and te reo Māori orthographic standards. The iwi involved expressed strong dislike of the decision, saying that standardisation of the written form is a loss of their identity and homogenisation of culture, and that they want their children to not be penalised in schools and to learn written te reo Māori in their regional form. The public consultations on the name change ran until early November that year. The Board's recommended name was approved by the Land Information Minister Damien O'Connor in March 2023.

== See also ==
- List of Auckland railway stations
- Public transport in Auckland
