= Runciman railway station =

Defunct railway station in Auckland, New Zealand

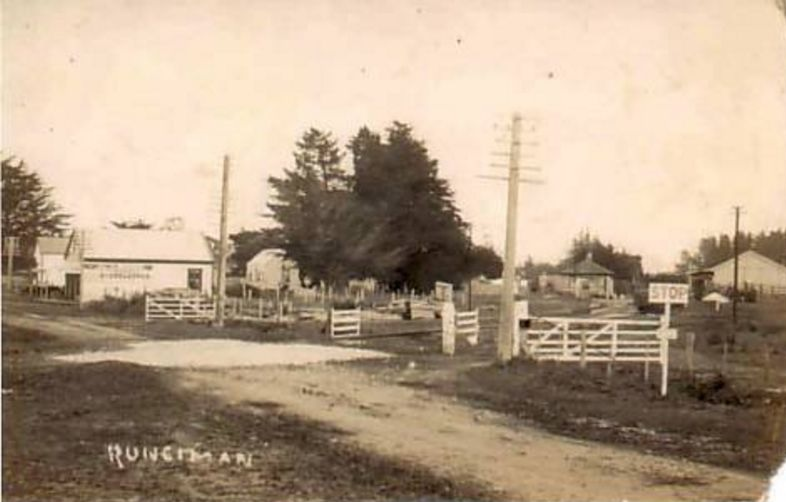

General information
- Location: Drury, New Zealand
- Coordinates: 37.115800°S 174.942600°E
- Elevation: 13 m (43 ft)
- Line: North Island Main Trunk
- Distance: Wellington 638.37 km (396.66 mi)

History
- Opened: 1879
- Closed: 8 December 1918
- Former names: briefly Oira in 1909

Adjacent stations
Preceding station	KiwiRail	Following station
Drury Line open, station reopening soon towards Waitematā	North Island Main Trunk	Ngākōroa Line open, station opening soon towards Wellington
Location
- 1: Runciman station 1882–1918, 2: Drury station 1874–1918, 3: Drury station 1918–1972

Runciman railway station was a station on the North Island Main Trunk line in New Zealand, serving an area which had been sold by James Runciman in 1864. The station opened to goods traffic in 1879, then to passengers in 1882.

The under-construction Ngakoroa train station, also in the wider Runciman area, is situated roughly 1km from the former station, and during planning was sometimes referred to as Runciman station.

== History ==
The Auckland and Drury Railway Act 1863 had been passed by Parliament "to enable the Superintendent of the Province of Auckland to construct a Railway between the Towns of Auckland and Drury with a Branch to Onehunga in the said Province." Later plans extended the terminus to Mercer.

Although the line was complete by late 1873, the first passenger train didn't run until 7 October 1874 and complaint continued about delays in opening the line. Possibly the delay was due to threats to blockade the line to force trains to stop at Runciman. There was debate about the location of the station as early as 1874.

The station opened to goods traffic on 28 July 1879, then to passengers circa April 1882.

The name was briefly changed to Oira on 3 January 1909, then back to Runciman on 9 August 1909.

Until 1917 Runciman station was next to a level crossing on the Great South Rd. Work then began to replace the crossing with a bridge, ease the gradient and build a new Drury central station, despite a protest petition about the move.

The station closed on 8 December 1918, replaced by Drury railway station which opened the next day.

== See also ==
- Drury Train Station replaced the former station in 1918.
- Ngakoroa Train Station under-construction in 2026, situated roughly 1km from the former station.
- Public transport in Auckland
- List of Auckland railway stations
