= Paerata =

- Interactive map of Paerata
- Coordinates: 37°10′15″S 174°54′0″E
- Country: New Zealand
- Region: Auckland Region
- Ward: Franklin ward
- Board: Franklin Local Board
- Electorates: Port Waikato; Hauraki-Waikato (Māori)

Government
  - Territorial Authority: Auckland Council
  - Mayor of Auckland: Wayne Brown
  - Port Waikato MP: Matthew Paul
  - Hauraki-Waikato MP: Hana-Rawhiti Maipi-Clarke

Area
  - Total: 2.56 km^{2} (0.99 sq mi)

Population (June 2025)
  - Total: 1,380
  - Density: 539/km^{2} (1,400/sq mi)
- Postcode: 2120
- Area code: 09

Paerata is a small settlement immediately to the north of Pukekohe, in the North Island of New Zealand. It is located on State Highway 22 some 10 kilometres (6.2 mi) south of the Manukau Harbour. Wesley College is located close to the northern edge of Paerata.

The name Paerata is a Māori term meaning a hill ridge (pae) bedecked with rata trees. Paerata was served by the Paerata railway station for more than a century, until the station was closed. However, in early 2021, KiwiRail confirmed a new railway station to be situated in Paerata Rise.

Infrastructure New Zealand suggested in October 2017 that the land around Paerata could be used for a new city with initially 30,000 homes, and a population of 500,000 people by 2050.

Paerata Rise, a 300-hectare development north of the settlement was opened in 2018 and is still being developed in stages. It is expected to be completed by 2040.

== Demographics ==
Statistics New Zealand describes Paerata as a rural settlement, which covers 2.56 km^{2} (0.99 sq mi). It had an estimated population of 1,380 as of June 2025, with a population density of 539 people per km^{2}. Paerata is part of the larger Ramarama statistical area.

Historical population
Year	Pop.	±% p.a.
2006	303	—
2013	156	−9.05%
2018	135	−2.85%
2023	1,008	+49.49%
The 2006 population is for a significantly larger area of 5.95 km^{2}. Source:

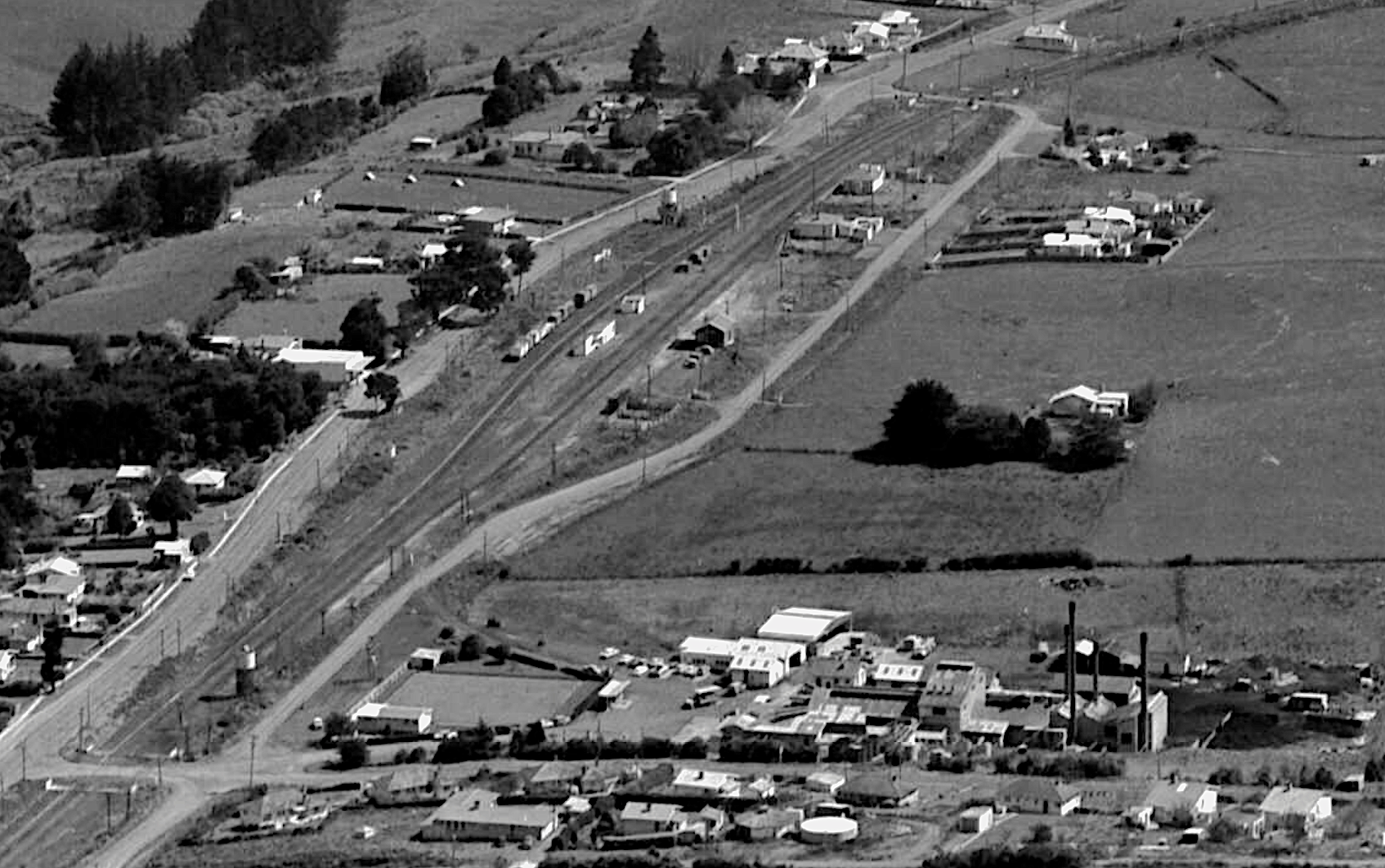
Paerata in 1962

Paerata had a population of 1,008 in the 2023 New Zealand census, an increase of 873 people (646.7%) since the 2018 census, and an increase of 852 people (546.2%) since the 2013 census. There were 516 males, 495 females and 3 people of other genders in 333 dwellings. 1.8% of people identified as LGBTIQ+. The median age was 32.2 years (compared with 38.1 years nationally). There were 240 people (23.8%) aged under 15 years, 213 (21.1%) aged 15 to 29, 489 (48.5%) aged 30 to 64, and 63 (6.2%) aged 65 or older.

People could identify as more than one ethnicity. The results were 59.5% European (Pākehā); 9.8% Māori; 19.0% Pasifika; 24.4% Asian; 1.8% Middle Eastern, Latin American and African New Zealanders (MELAA); and 1.2% other, which includes people giving their ethnicity as "New Zealander". English was spoken by 94.0%, Māori language by 1.2%, Samoan by 2.4%, and other languages by 25.6%. No language could be spoken by 3.6% (e.g. too young to talk). New Zealand Sign Language was known by 0.6%. The percentage of people born overseas was 39.6, compared with 28.8% nationally.

Religious affiliations were 42.6% Christian, 8.3% Hindu, 0.9% Islam, 0.6% Buddhist, 0.3% New Age, 0.3% Jewish, and 2.4% other religions. People who answered that they had no religion were 40.8%, and 4.2% of people did not answer the census question.

Of those at least 15 years old, 294 (38.3%) people had a bachelor's or higher degree, 348 (45.3%) had a post-high school certificate or diploma, and 123 (16.0%) people exclusively held high school qualifications. The median income was $67,100, compared with $41,500 nationally. 159 people (20.7%) earned over $100,000 compared to 12.1% nationally. The employment status of those at least 15 was that 534 (69.5%) people were employed full-time, 75 (9.8%) were part-time, and 12 (1.6%) were unemployed.

== Dairy factories ==
New Zealand Dairy Co opened a factory on 6 March 1924. A fire at its Pukekohe factory hastened construction. It was built of corrugated iron and used machinery previously intended for an upgrade to the Mount Eden factory. From 1950 to 1956 milk powder was produced. Casein production began in 1956. Butter production ended in 1970. In 1996 it employed 170 people, but closed in 1998. The factory then became a business park.

NIG Nutritional's milk powder plant in Paerata opened in 2012 and was extended in 2019. It processes goat milk.

== Education ==
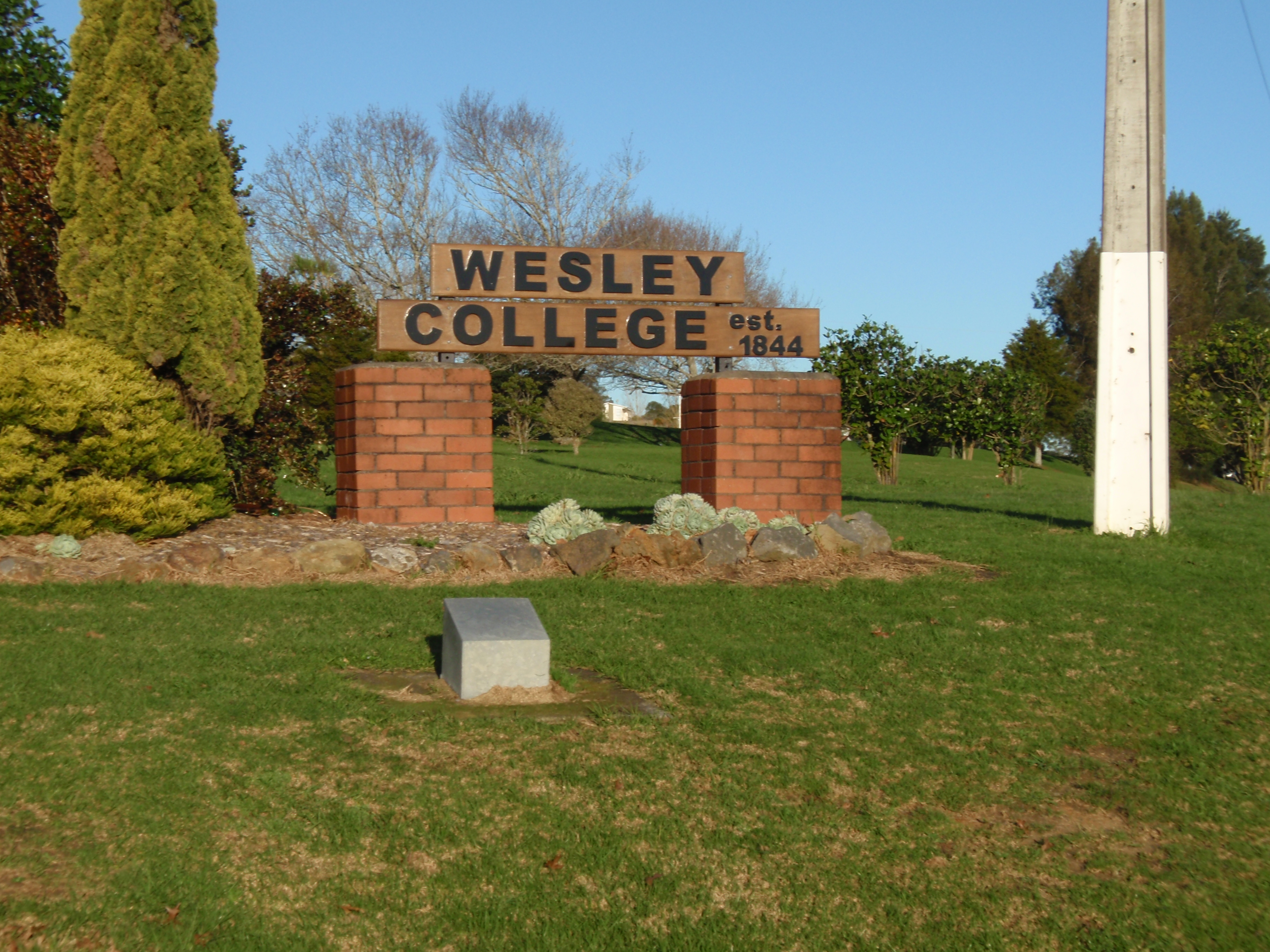
Wesley College entrance

Wesley College is a state-integrated secondary school (years 9–13) with a roll of 330. The college was founded in 1844, making it the oldest registered secondary school in New Zealand, and moved to its current site in 1924. It is associated with the Methodist Church of New Zealand. The junior classes (years 9–10) are for boys only, and the senior classes are coeducational.

Paerata School is a coeducational full primary school (years 1–8) with a roll of 177. The school opened in 1921. In 2021, the school moved its site to the Paerata Rise development

Rolls are as of July 2026.

== Climate ==
Climate data for Paerata (1951–1980)
Month	Jan	Feb	Mar	Apr	May	Jun	Jul	Aug	Sep	Oct	Nov	Dec	Year
Mean daily maximum °C (°F)	24.2 (75.6)	24.6 (76.3)	23.3 (73.9)	20.3 (68.5)	17.5 (63.5)	15.2 (59.4)	14.3 (57.7)	15.1 (59.2)	16.5 (61.7)	18.1 (64.6)	20.1 (68.2)	22.3 (72.1)	19.3 (66.7)
Daily mean °C (°F)	18.8 (65.8)	19.4 (66.9)	18.3 (64.9)	15.7 (60.3)	13.2 (55.8)	10.9 (51.6)	10.1 (50.2)	10.9 (51.6)	12.1 (53.8)	13.6 (56.5)	15.2 (59.4)	17.3 (63.1)	14.6 (58.3)
Mean daily minimum °C (°F)	13.4 (56.1)	14.1 (57.4)	13.2 (55.8)	11.0 (51.8)	8.8 (47.8)	6.6 (43.9)	5.8 (42.4)	6.7 (44.1)	7.6 (45.7)	9.1 (48.4)	10.3 (50.5)	12.3 (54.1)	9.9 (49.8)
Average rainfall mm (inches)	85 (3.3)	99 (3.9)	88 (3.5)	128 (5.0)	135 (5.3)	160 (6.3)	146 (5.7)	125 (4.9)	98 (3.9)	102 (4.0)	102 (4.0)	99 (3.9)	1,367 (53.7)
Source: NIWA
