= Homai railway station =

Train station in Auckland, New Zealand

Homai
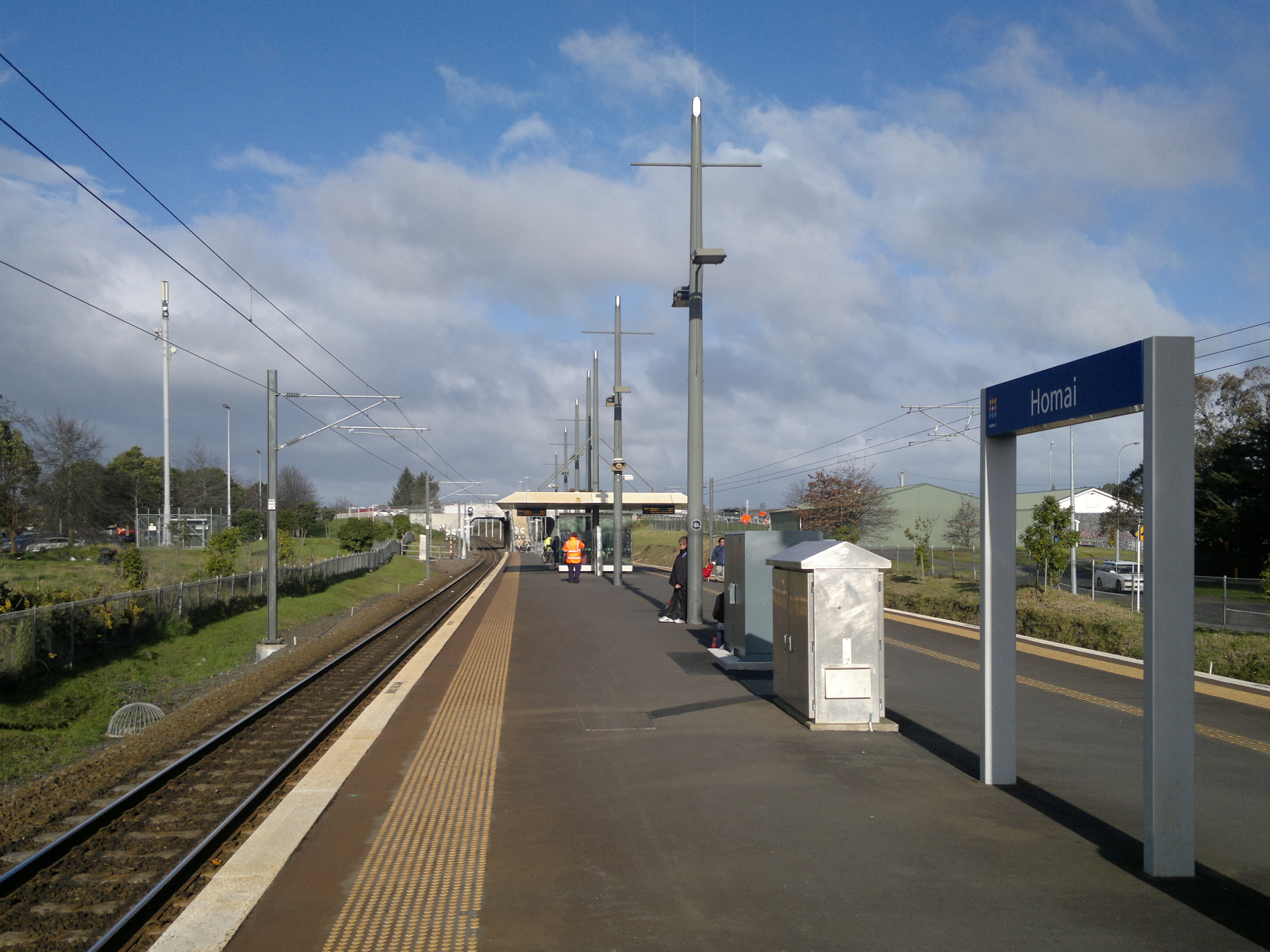
- Looking south at Homai station in 2014

General information
- Location: Homai, Auckland; New Zealand
- Coordinates: 37.0134°S 174.8748°E
- System: Auckland Transport Urban rail
- Owner: KiwiRail (track and platforms); Auckland Transport (buildings)
- Operator: Auckland One Rail
- Line: North Island Main Trunk
- Distance: 655.70 km (407.43 mi) from Wellington
- Platforms: Island platform (P1 & P2)
- Tracks: Mainline (2)

Construction
- Parking: Yes
- Accessible: Yes

Other information
- Fare zone: Southern Manukau

History
- Opened: 15 August 1924
- Rebuilt: 2006
- Electrified: April 2014

Passengers
- 2011: 1,707 passengers/weekday

Services
Preceding station	Auckland Transport (Auckland One Rail)	Following station
Manurewa towards Pukekohe	South City Line	Puhinui towards Newmarket

Adjacent stations
Preceding station	KiwiRail	Following station
Wiri; Staff only	North Island Main Trunk	Manurewa
Location

Homai railway station is on the South City line of the Auckland railway network in New Zealand. It has an island platform layout. A bus stop and a park and ride facility are located adjacent to the station.

== History ==
The North Island Main Trunk line through South Auckland was opened on 20 May 1875, as part of the Auckland and Mercer Railway, built by Brogden & Co, who extended it from Penrose.

However, Homai Station didn't open until 15 August 1924, after local farmers John Dreadon, Alexander and Masters lobbied Prime Minister William Massey. In line with other stations opened in Auckland suburbs at the time, it was partly financed by local developers. In the case of Homai, John Dreadon donated £500 and land for the station and the bridge, which replaced a level crossing. Three other landowners also contributed. As a result, it was decided to name the station using the Māori word for 'gift', homai, rather than Browns Rd, as it was initially referred to.

Duplication of the tracks between Papatoetoe and Papakura, through Homai, started in 1929 as an employment relief scheme and was completed on 29 March 1931.

Daily boardings were measured as 338 in 2003. This figure had jumped to 936 by 2010.

The station was upgraded in 2006 with a modern shelter, platform lighting and a much longer platform installed.

As part of the 2007 New Zealand budget it was announced that the station would be electrified. By January 2014 wires had been installed. In July 2015 electric trains began operating all passenger services.

As part of the Level Crossing Removal Programme, the level crossings that previously provided access to the station were removed. The level crossings were replaced with new pathways from the carpark and Mcvilly Road and an accessible ramp from Browns Road. The station was blessed by mana whenua, Ngāti Te Ata Waiohua and re-opened to passengers in January 2025.

== Services ==
Auckland One Rail, on behalf of Auckland Transport, operates South City line services to Newmarket and Pukekohe.

Homai station is served by bus route 365 while bus route 39 also passes close by.

== See also ==
- List of Auckland railway stations
