= South City line =

Railway service in Auckland, New Zealand

- S-C
- South City train at Te Waihorotiu

Overview
- Service type: Commuter rail
- System: Public transport in Auckland
- Locale: Auckland, New Zealand
- First service: 13 September 2026
- Current operator: Auckland One Rail

Route
- Termini: Pukekohe; Newmarket
- Stops: 23
- Service frequency: 10 minutes (peak); 15 minutes (off-peak)
- Lines used: North Island Main Trunk; North Auckland Line; Newmarket Line

Technical
- Rolling stock: AM class
- Track gauge: 1,067 mm (3 ft 6 in)
- Electrification: Overhead line, 25 kV 50 Hz AC
- Track owners: KiwiRail (tracks and platforms); Auckland Transport (trains and buildings)

The South City line (S-C) is a train service operating in Auckland, New Zealand. The line runs between Pukekohe and Newmarket via Grafton. It connects to other rapid transit lines: AirportLink Bus, NX1, NX2, East West line (E-W), Onehunga West line (O-W) and WX1. Prior to the opening of the City Rail Link on 13 September 2026, services ran direct to Waitematā from Newmarket via Parnell as the Southern Line. The South City line runs every 10 minutes during peak times and every 15 minutes during off-peak.

== Routing ==
From Pukekohe in the south of the Auckland Region, South City line services operate northward via the North Island Main Trunk. At Westfield Junction, trains pass onto the North Auckland Line to reach Grafton via Newmarket. After Grafton, trains enter the City Rail Link tunnels to rejoin the North Island Main Trunk, passing beneath the Auckland CBD through the underground stations Karanga-a-Hape, Te Waihorotiu and Waitematā. After re-surfacing on the eastern side of the CBD, trains turn back southward onto the short Newmarket Line to return to Newmarket, where services terminate.

Prior to the opening of the City Rail Link, Southern Line services used the Newmarket Line from Waitematā to Newmarket, then followed the North Auckland Line to Westfield Junction, and thence onto the North Island Main Trunk (NIMT) line as far as Pukekohe. In its entirety, this line followed the original 1875 North Island Main Trunk route between central Auckland and Pukekohe.

The line, originally single-tracked, was duplicated, piecemeal, between 1909 and 1939. In 1915, the original single-track Parnell tunnel was bypassed by a twin-track tunnel. The older tunnel can be seen alongside the current one, between Parnell station and Newmarket Junction.

== History ==
In 1930, the Westfield Deviation opened a new eastern route for the NIMT between Auckland and Westfield via Glen Innes. The route between Auckland and Westfield via Newmarket then ceased to be part of the NIMT. The portion between Newmarket and Westfield became part of the North Auckland Line (NAL), which runs between Westfield and Whangārei.

The Southern Line suburban services continued to run on the older route. A new line, called the Eastern Line, was introduced for services on the new route. While the Eastern and Southern lines have a different route between Auckland and Westfield, they share the same tracks between Westfield and Puhinui station.

=== Third Main Line ===
Construction for the third main line, as part of the Wiri to Quay Park began in 2020 and was completed by 2025. It is expected to ease congestion on Auckland rail lines by allowing "through" trains to pass stationary trains at stations, improve rail freight access from the Port of Auckland to the Westfield yards and allow more frequent passenger and freight services. The new line runs between Westfield Junction and just south of Wiri Depot.

The $315 million funding package for these works was announced as part of the Government's New Zealand Upgrade Programme.

=== Electrification ===
Along with the rest of Auckland's suburban railway network, the Southern Line was electrified from Waitematā to Papakura, with electric services beginning in 2014. Services between Pukekohe and Papakura were initially provided by diesel multiple units (DMUs). In 2020, as part of the New Zealand Upgrade Programme, the government announced $371 million in funding to extend electrification from Papakura to Pukekohe. The project was completed in early 2025, and electric train services from Pukekohe commenced on 3 February 2025.

== Replacement ==
After the opening of the City Rail Link on 13 September 2026, the Southern Line became the South City line; trains now run Pukekohe to Newmarket, then to Waitematā railway station via Grafton and the City Rail Link before returning to Newmarket via Parnell and terminating.

== Stations ==
| Name | Opened | Notes |
| Newmarket | 20 December 1873 | |
| Parnell | 12 March 2017 | |
| Waitematā | 7 July 2003 | |
| Te Waihorotiu | 13 September 2026 | |
| Karanga-a-Hape | 13 September 2026 | |
| Grafton | 11 April 2010 | |
| Newmarket | 20 December 1873 | |
| Remuera | 20 December 1873 | |
| Greenlane | 20 December 1873 | |
| Ellerslie | 20 December 1873 | |
| Penrose | 24 December 1873 | |
| Ōtāhuhu | 20 May 1875 | New station and bus–train interchange opened 29 October 2016. |
| Middlemore | 20 July 1947 | |
| Papatoetoe | 20 May 1875 | |
| Puhinui | 29 June 1925 | New station and bus–train interchange opened 26 July 2021. |
| Homai | 15 August 1924 | |
| Manurewa | 20 May 1875 | |
| Te Mahia | 16 August 1926 | |
| Takaanini | 9 December 1913 | |
| Papakura | 20 May 1875 | |
| Drury | 2 August 2026 | |
| Paerātā | 2 August 2026 | |
| Pukekohe | 20 May 1875 | |

== Future ==
Ngākōroa Station is under construction and due to open in 2027. The station will be located on the existing rail line between Paerātā and Drury, about 450 m south of the existing intersection of State Highway 22/Karaka Road and Jesmond Road.

== See also ==
- Public transport in Auckland
- List of Auckland railway stations
