= Paerātā railway station =

Train station in Auckland, New Zealand

Paerātā
- Platforms at Paerātā, 2026

General information
- Location: Paerata, Auckland; New Zealand
- Coordinates: 37.1564°S 174.8976°E
- System: Auckland Transport Urban rail
- Owner: KiwiRail
- Operator: Auckland One Rail
- Lines: North Island Main Trunk; Mission Bush Branch
- Distance: 632.65 km (393.11 mi) from Wellington
- Platforms: Side platforms (P1 & P2)
- Tracks: Mainline (2)
- Connections: 42

Other information
- Station code: PTA
- Fare zone: Southern Manukau

History
- Opened: 2 August 2026
- Electrified: 2024

Key dates
- 1875: Original station opened
- 1982: Original station closed

Services
Preceding station	Auckland Transport (Auckland One Rail)	Following station
Pukekohe Terminus	South City Line	Drury towards Newmarket
Preceding station	KiwiRail	Following station
Historical railways
Runciman (closed) towards Waitematā	North Island Main Trunk	Pukekohe towards Wellington
Location

Paerātā railway station is station serving the Paerata area in Auckland, New Zealand, notably the new Paerata Rise housing development. The station is served by the South City line and is located on the North Island Main Trunk railway line. The station has a large park-and-ride facility and interchange with local bus services.

Between 1875 and 1972, Paerata was a flag station, 28 mi (45 km) south of Auckland, on the North Island Main Trunk in New Zealand, serving the Paerata settlement. This station was located one kilometre to the south of the modern station.

== History ==
=== Proposal and planning ===
New train stations for Drury West and Paerata are included in a July 2017 proposal for Auckland infrastructure spending of $600 million to support new housing announced by the government. They will be built and owned by a new Crown Infrastructure Partners body, as the Auckland Council has reached its borrowing limit. The new station will be just east of Paerata Rise, about 1 km (0.62 mi) north of the original station.

As part of the New Zealand Upgrade Programme, the Sixth Labour Government announced $371 million in funding towards the electrification of track from Papakura to Pukekohe, and a separate $247 million towards the construction of two new stations in Drury Central and Drury West. This was later expanded to include a third station at Paerata.

Planning consent was granted for the Drury Central and Paerata stations in February 2022, with further work being undertaken to gain approval for the Drury West station.

=== Naming ===
In May 2022, KiwiRail and Auckland Transport proposed a name for the new station, gifted by mana whenua. The placeholder name of Paerata was replaced by Paeraataa, reflecting the preference of Waikato Tainui for using double vowels instead of macrons to indicate vowel length. The name derives from a conflation of pae, a Māori word meaning 'a ridge or resting place', and raataa, referring to a rātā tree.

In August 2022, the New Zealand Geographic Board, rejected the use of double vowels, and instead recommended the name Paerātā, in line with national standards. The iwi involved expressed strong dislike of the decision, but the board's recommended name was approved by the Land Information Minister Damien O'Connor in March 2023.

=== Opening ===
Minister for Rail Winston Peters and Simon Watts, representing the Minister of Transport, officially opened the Paerātā and Drury stations during a ceremony held at Drury on 1 August 2026. Passenger services began the following day.

== Original station ==
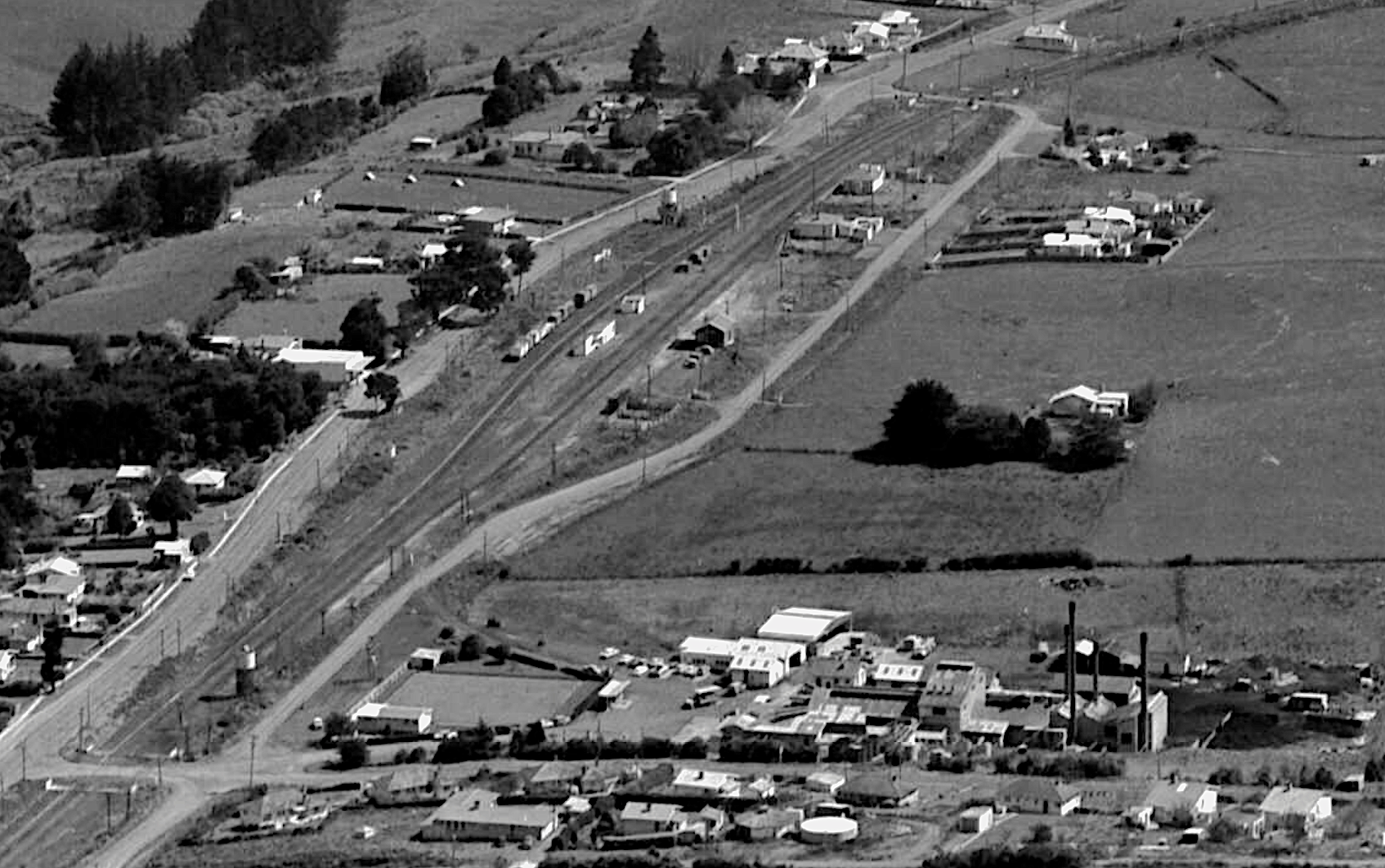
Paerata in 1962.

The original station was opened on 20 May 1875. It was closed to passengers on 24 July 1972, and to all traffic on 1 October 1982. A crossing loop was retained.

In 1981, Paerata junction to the Waiuku Branch was re-designed and resignalled, with a new connection towards Pukekohe.

=== Construction ===
The line from Ōtāhuhu reached Paerata in 1873. and opened to Mercer on 20 May 1875. A building was erected in 1874 for £30. By 1884, when Paerata first appeared in timetables, there was a shelter shed and a passing loop for 22 wagons. By 1896, there was also a passenger platform with a cart approach and a 28 wagon loop. Sheep yards and a loading bank followed and, from 1906, a Post Office was run by station staff, which moved to Messent's store in 1923.

=== Junction station ===
In preparation for the Waiuku Branch, the loop was extended in 1913 to 70 wagons, two cottages and a goods shed were built in 1914 and the station became an island platform in 1917.

The gradient on the Karaka bank, between Runciman and Paerata, was eased from 1 in 40 to 1 in 100 between 1914 and 1916. The work included large cuttings and embankments. A cutting about 1 mi (1.6 km) north of Paerata suffered from 5 slips in the next decade. One of the slips in 1916 was temporarily bypassed by relaying track on the old alignment. A new passing loop was also added at Karaka, 4.74 km (2.95 mi) north of Paerata.

Paerata became a junction station from 10 December 1917, when the first section of the Waiuku Branch opened as far as Patumahoe. The initial service on the branch in 1922 was only a train each way on Tuesdays and Fridays.

=== Upgrades ===
Automatic signalling replaced token blocks in 1926.

From 1923 until at least 1943, the dairy factory had a private siding.

In 1928, 35 wagons were derailed between Pukekohe and Paerata.

Duplication of line between Papakura and Paerata was completed by 3 December 1939 and to Pukekohe in 1941.

=== Closure ===
On 24 July 1972, Paerata closed to all traffic, except in wagon lots. The stockyards were removed and the goods shed moved to Ōtāhuhu Rail Weld Depot in 1973. The station closed to all traffic on 17 July 1977.

In 1978, the goods shed loop was sold to Glenbrook Vintage Railway. By 1982, the station building had been demolished.

== See also ==
- List of Auckland railway stations
- Public transport in Auckland
