= Drury railway station =

Train station in Auckland, New Zealand

Drury
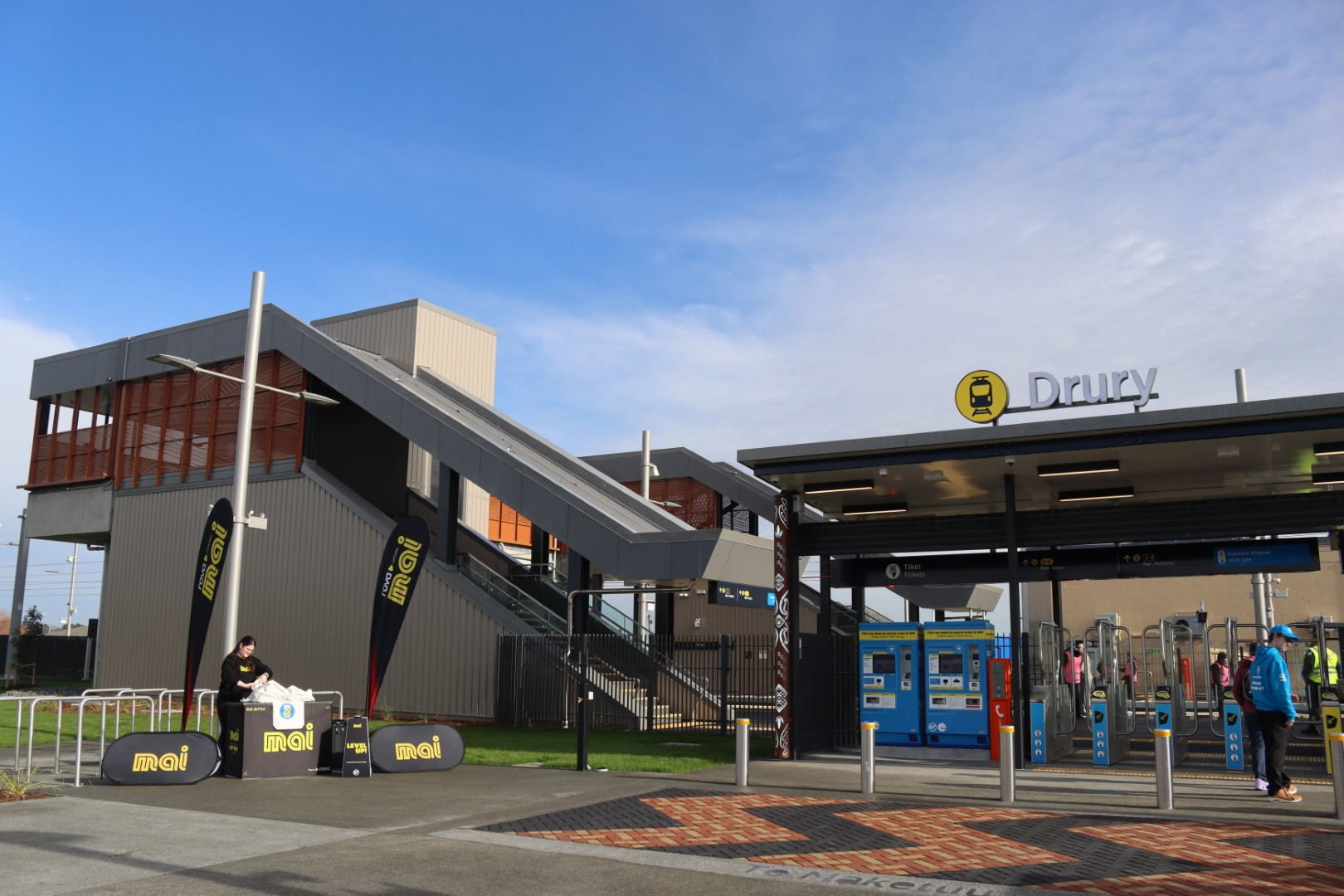
- Main entrance to Drury railway station

General information
- Location: Drury, Auckland; New Zealand
- Coordinates: 37.104°S 174.952°E
- System: Auckland Transport Urban rail
- Owner: KiwiRail
- Operator: Auckland One Rail
- Line: North Island Main Trunk
- Platforms: Side platforms (P1 & P2)
- Tracks: Mainline (2)

Construction
- Parking: Yes
- Cycle facilities: Yes
- Accessible: Yes (Lifts)

Other information
- Fare zone: Southern Manukau

History
- Opened: 2 August 2026
- Electrified: 2024

Key dates
- 1875: First station opened
- 1918: Moved
- 1972: First station closed

Services
Preceding station	Auckland Transport (Auckland One Rail)	Following station
Paerātā towards Pukekohe	South City Line	Papakura towards Newmarket

Former services
Preceding station	KiwiRail	Following station
Opaheke Line open, station closed towards Waitematā	North Island Main Trunk	Runciman Line open, station closed towards Wellington
Track layout
Location
- 1: First site 1874–1918, 2: Second site 1918–1972, 3: Current site 2026–

Drury railway station is a railway station in Auckland, New Zealand. It serves the Drury area in south Auckland. The station is located on the existing North Island Main Trunk railway line, south of Waihoehoe Road, between Flanagan Rd and Great South Rd.

Between 1874 and 1972, it was a station on the North Island Main Trunk line in New Zealand. It was a stop for southern services on the Auckland railway network.

== History ==
Early in 1862 the Provincial Council Superintendent brought to the consideration of members a project for a railway connecting Auckland with Drury. After much debate and discussion it was agreed that surveys should be completed for a proposed line of railway from Auckland to Drury. The first survey for the Auckland to Drury Railway was undertaken in 1862. The Auckland and Drury Railway Act 1863 was passed on 14 December 1863 "to enable the Superintendent of the Province of Auckland to construct a Railway between the Towns of Auckland and Drury with a Branch to Onehunga in the said Province."

Construction of the railway began in February 1865. By 1874 the main line had reached Drury. In October 1874 excursion trains ran between Penrose Junction and Drury.

=== First site ===
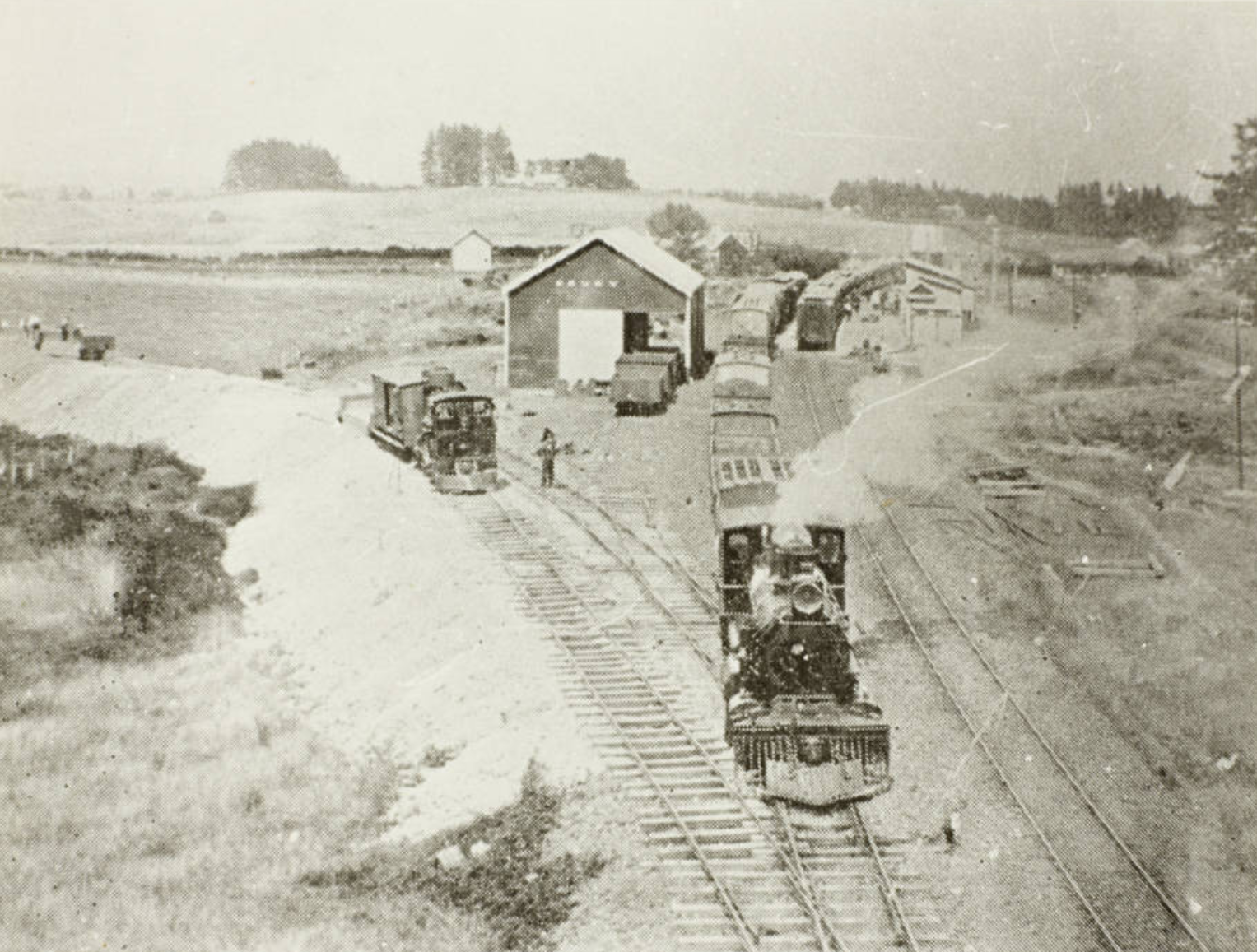
Drury railway station, 1905

Approximate route of The Drury Coal Company's railway.

The first Drury railway station was opened on 20 May 1875 as a 'fourth class' station. Regular passenger services began on 20 May 1875 with two trains per day each way; these left Auckland and Mercer respectively at 7.15am and 4.40pm and passed each other at Drury.

In 1905 the Drury Coal Company opened a coal mine in Drury. A narrow gauge steam powered railway was built from the mine, terminating at Drury station. This roughly followed the route of an older wooden horse-drawn tramway which was used to transport coal from the Waihoihoi Coal Mining Company's mine (ca 1859–1864) to a wharf near the mouth of Slippery Creek. Availability of fuel and clay led to the opening of a pottery and brickworks near the mine in 1906. The railway was upgraded to a wider gauge and connected to the main line in 1908. The venture was not a financial success, with the company being liquidated and reformed several times. Following the decline, this railway was closed in 1921.

=== Second site ===
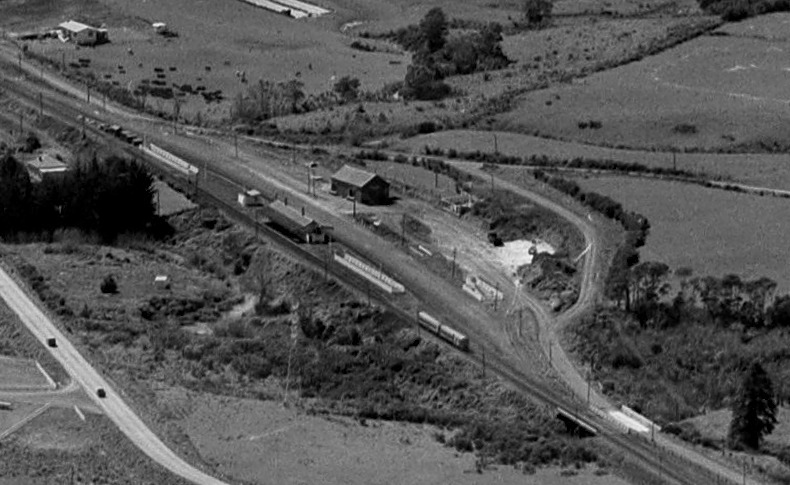
Drury railway station, 1962. Excerpt from oblique aerial photo.

On 8 December 1918, the existing station was replaced by a new Drury station building on a new site which also replaced the Runciman railway station.

The Main Trunk Express train from Auckland to Wellington was derailed at Drury station on 11 August 1922. The engine and two postal vans left the rails just as the train entered the station.

On 21 May 1972, the station was closed. The building is burned down the following year.

=== Current site ===
As part of the New Zealand Upgrade Programme, the Sixth Labour Government announced $371 million in funding towards the electrification of track from Papakura to Pukekohe, and a separate $247 million towards the construction of two new stations in Drury Central and Drury West. Planning consent was granted for the Drury Central station in February 2022.

In May 2022, KiwiRail and Auckland Transport announced a proposed name for the station, gifted by mana whenua. The placeholder name 'Drury Central' was replaced by 'Maketuu', paying tribute to the traditional name of the Maketuu stream, as well as the historic name of Te Maketuu Pā, which are both located nearby. In August 2022, the New Zealand Geographic Board recommended the name 'Drury', saying the name 'Maketuu' had little association with the local area and may be confusing. Public consultations on the name change ran until early November that year, with iwi expressing strong dislike of the decision. The Board's recommended name was approved by the Land Information Minister in March 2023.

Construction of the new station began in December 2024. In a ceremony held at the station on 1 August 2026, Minister for Rail Winston Peters and Simon Watts, representing the Minister of Transport, officially opened the Drury and Paerātā stations. Auckland Transport services commenced on Sunday 2 August.

== See also ==
- List of Auckland railway stations
- Public transport in Auckland
- Onehunga Branch
