= STH (gene) =

Protein-coding gene in the species Homo sapiens

Identifiers
- Aliases: STH, MAPTIT, saitohin
- External IDs: OMIM: 607067; HomoloGene: 88448; GeneCards: STH; OMA:STH - orthologs

Gene location (Human)
Chr.	Chromosome 17 (human)
Band	17q21.31	Start	45,999,250 bp
Band	17q21.31	End	45,999,694 bp
RNA expression pattern
Bgee	Human / Mouse (ortholog); Top expressed in: testicle; corpus callosum; cerebellar hemisphere; right hemisphere of cerebellum; skeletal muscle tissue; gastrocnemius muscle; caudate nucleus; right frontal lobe; hypothalamus; hippocampus proper / n/a; More reference expression data
BioGPS	n/a
Gene ontology
Molecular function	protein binding
Cellular component	nucleus; cytoplasm; perinuclear region of cytoplasm
Biological process	positive regulation of mRNA splicing, via spliceosome
Sources:Amigo / QuickGO
Orthologs
Species	Human	Mouse
Entrez	246744	n/a
Ensembl	ENSG00000256762; ENSG00000281139	n/a
UniProt	Q8IWL8	n/a
RefSeq (mRNA)	NM_001007532	n/a
RefSeq (protein)	NP_001007533	n/a
Location (UCSC)	Chr 17: 46 – 46 Mb	n/a
PubMed search		n/a
- Wikidata
View/Edit Human

Saitohin is a protein that in humans is encoded by the STH gene. This intronless gene encodes for 128 amino acids in an open reading frame. It is located in the human tau gene, in the intron between exons 9 and 10. Also, a single polymorphism of a nucleotide is seen through a change of glutamine residue 7(Q7R) to arginine. It is found to be susceptible to multiple degenerative diseases, however, the exact function of the gene is still unknown.
