= Pukekohe railway station =

Train station in Auckland, New Zealand

Pukekohe
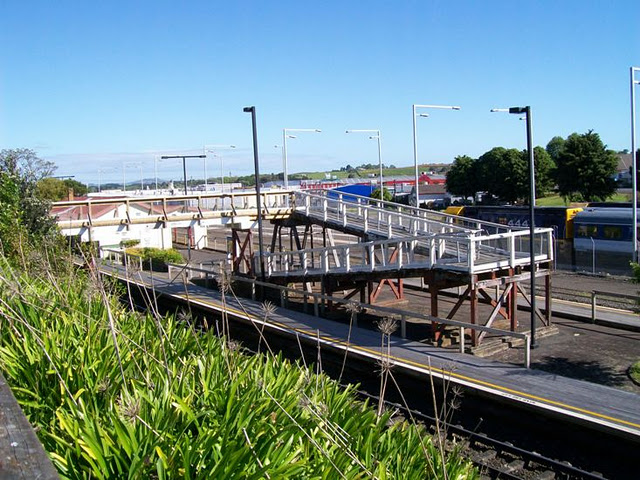
- Pukekohe station prior to its upgrade

General information
- Location: 40 Station Road, Pukekohe, New Zealand
- Coordinates: 37.2033°S 174.9100°E
- System: Auckland Transport Urban rail
- Owner: KiwiRail (track and platforms); Auckland Transport (buildings)
- Operator: Auckland One Rail
- Line: North Island Main Trunk
- Distance: 628.86 km (390.76 mi) from Wellington
- Platforms: First island platform (P1 & P2); Second island platform (P3 & P4)
- Tracks: Mainline (3); Passing loop (2); Backshunt (1)

Construction
- Parking: Yes
- Cycle facilities: Yes
- Accessible: Yes (Lifts)

Other information
- Fare zone: Southern Manukau

History
- Opened: 20 May 1875
- Rebuilt: 1913, 2022–2025
- Electrified: 2024

Passengers
- 2018-19: 269,000

Services
Preceding station	Auckland Transport (Auckland One Rail)	Following station
Terminus	South City Line	Paerātā towards Newmarket
Preceding station	KiwiRail	Following station
Puhinui towards Auckland Strand	Te Huia	Huntly towards Hamilton (Frankton)
Historical railways
Preceding station	KiwiRail	Following station
Paerata Line open, station closed 2.43 km (1.51 mi) towards Waitematā	North Island Main Trunk	Buckland Line open, station closed 3.06 km (1.90 mi) towards Wellington
Location

Pukekohe railway station is a railway station in Pukekohe, New Zealand. It is the southern terminus of the South City line of the Auckland railway network.

== History ==
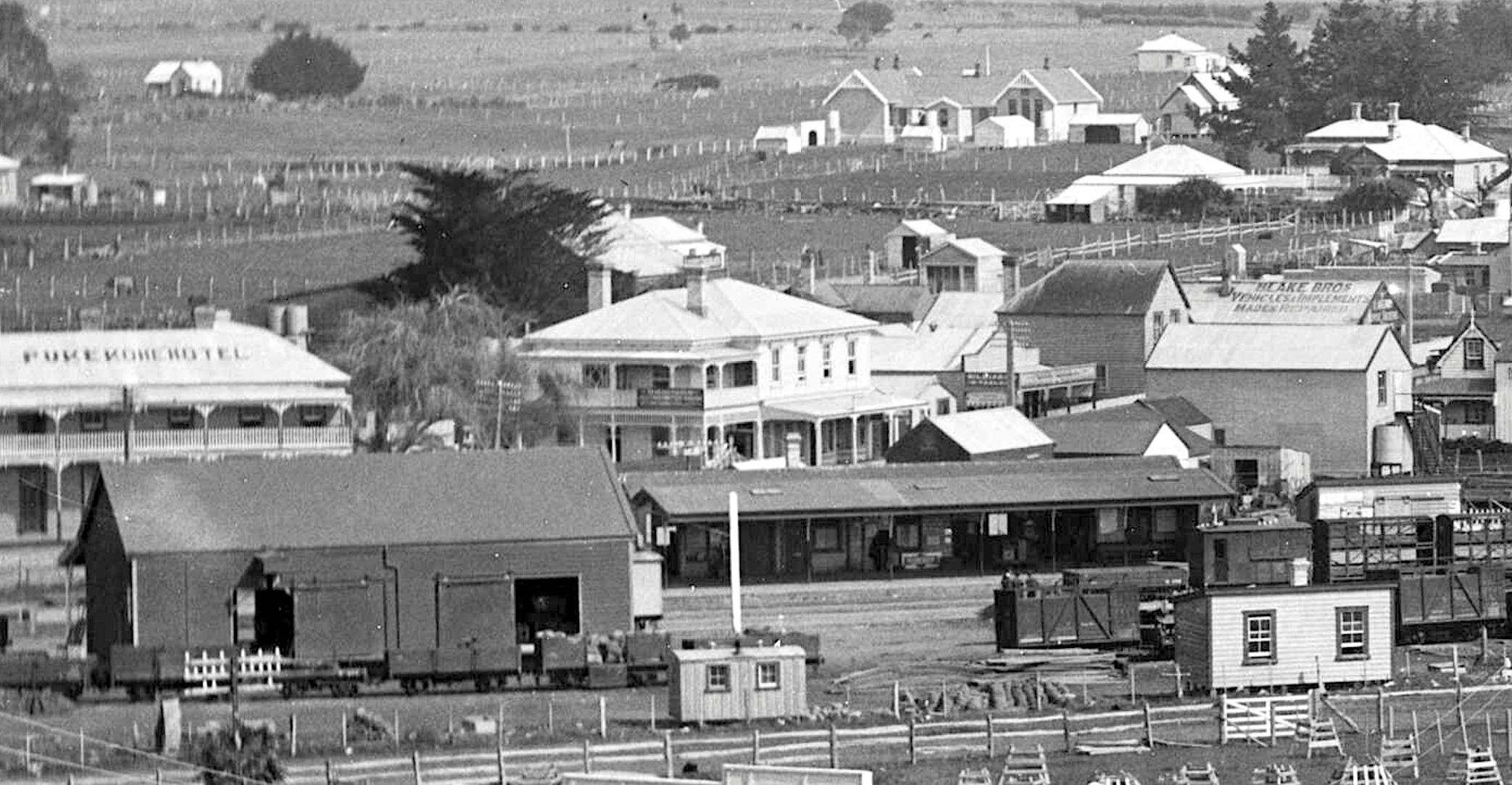
Pukekohe Hotel and railway station about 1910

Extension of the line to Mercer officially linked Pukekohe to Auckland by rail in May 1875, with the trip into Auckland taking two and a half hours. The station was close to the Pukekohe Hotel, on a site which now forms the intersection of King Street, Manukau Road and Massey Avenue. The new railway caused the town centre to be refocused, with commercial activities being concentrated around King Street.

In April 1877 a parcel delivery service began, delivering parcels from the railway station to storekeepers and residents. By 1893 the post office had been relocated to the railway station. Later it moved further up King Street and formally opened on 18 September 1909 as the Pukekohe Post Office.

=== Current site ===
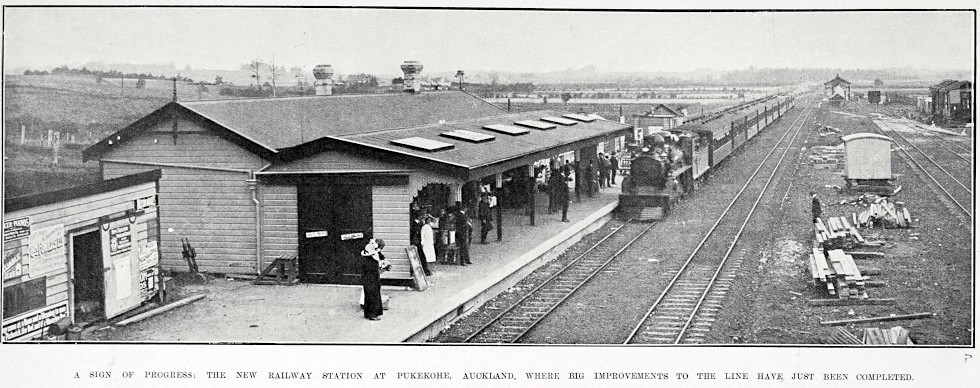
Pukekohe station in 1913

Construction of a new station at the current site started in 1912, and it was in use by 1913. The original station building was relocated to the new station and converted into a goods shed. A new station building was constructed of a Troup era Class/Type B design.

On 27 April 1920, during the visit of HRH Edward Prince of Wales to New Zealand, the royal train stopped at Pukekohe. The Prince was presented to local dignitaries, replied to an address of welcome, and inspected assembled returned soldiers and schoolchildren. On 26 February 1927, the fourth day of the royal visit of the Duke and Duchess of York to New Zealand, the royal train again stopped at Pukekohe, where a granddaughter of the former Prime Minister William Ferguson Massey presented a bouquet to the Duchess on behalf of the district.

Over time the station building was expanded to provide more passenger shelter and accommodate track layout changes. The second main line through Pukekohe was opened on 21 November 1954, with the new track on the eastern side of the platform. Around this time a new eastern veranda was erected and the station was extended to the north.

Second-hand diesel multiple units were introduced in 1993, purchased for the Auckland rail system from Perth in 1993. Nearly all stations were modified to accommodate the lack of external steps. Secondary raised platforms were added at Pukekohe station.

A commuter train service between Hamilton and Auckland was introduced on 26 June 2000, with stops at Huntly, Pukekohe, Papakura, Middlemore and Newmarket. The service was halted as uneconomic on 7 October 2001, but on the same day Auckland Southern Line passenger services were extended to Pukekohe. Late evening and regular Sunday services began on 25 October 2005.

=== 2018 upgrade ===
On 23 November 2016 Transport Minister Simon Bridges and Auckland Mayor Phil Goff turned the first sod on a $14.4 m project to upgrade the station and develop a fully-integrated bus and train interchange. The upgrade also included replacement of the wooden sections of platform and a new footbridge and lifts. The completed facility was formally opened on 6 June 2018.

=== Electrification ===
Electrification of the rail line from Papakura to Pukekohe was announced in 2020; with the upgrade then planned to be completed by 2021. On 13 August 2022, the station was closed for redevelopment. The redevelopment included a new 4-platform layout with a stabling yard for electric trains, a new operatory facility for train drivers, and a new track layout to accommodate through-running of freight services.

In 2023, the 1913 station building was relocated to Matangi for preservation. As one of the few surviving island-platform station buildings from the North Island Main Trunk, it is an example of a classic provincial station building.

Transport Minister Chris Bishop officially re-opened the station on 2 February 2025, with services resuming the following day. On 10 February 2025, long-distance Te Huia services between Auckland and Hamilton began to stop at Pukekohe Station.

== Patronage ==
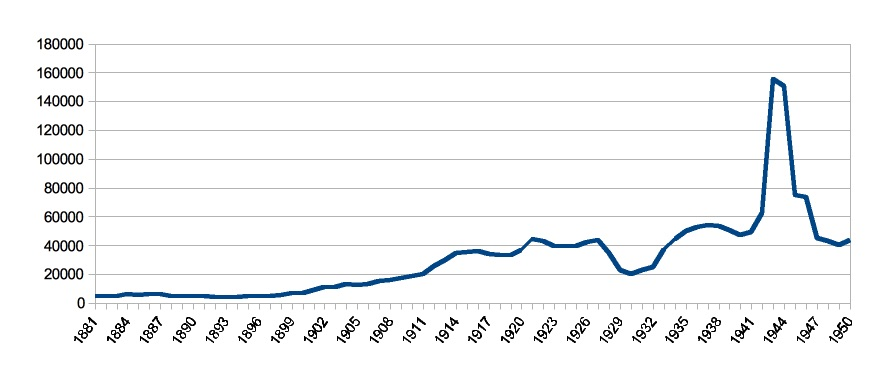
Ticket sales 1881-1950 - derived from annual returns to Parliament of "Statement of Revenue for each Station for the Year ended"

The table and graph below show a slow growth in passenger numbers, with a peak during World War 2. At 269,000, the current numbers far exceed even that 1943 peak of 155,392, but Pukekohe's population has grown from 3,610 in 1947 to 11,676 in 2018. However, there were fewer than 100 passengers a day in 2001, but numbers rose rapidly to over 500 by 2011.

year	tickets	season tickets	staff
1881	4,637		3
1882	5,004		3
1883	5,002		3
1884	6,469		3
1885	5,771	31	3
1886	6,216	47	3
1887	6,081	48	3
1888	5,107	47	2
1889	5,027	27	3
1890	N/A		
1891	4,718	28	3
1892	4,502	17	3
1893	4,437	10	3
1894	4,504	22	3
1895	4,868	12	3
1896	4,936	8	3
1897	5,053	34	3
1898	5,883	15	3
1899	6,595	26	4
1900	7,066	40	4
1901	N/A		
1902	10,911	49	5
1903	11,005	42	5
1904	12,926	75	5
1905	12,816	101	6
1906	13,507	149	6
1907	14,953	112	5
1908	16,033	106	6
1909	17,086	112	6
1910	18,504	115	5
1911	20,325	142	6
1912	25,667	119	8
1913	29,578	242	9
1914	34,928	287	
1915	35,057	266	
1916	36,170	279	
1917	34,214	301	
1918	33,026	265	
1919	33,510	306	
1920	37,080	323	
1921	44,162	339	
1922	43,255	465	
1923	39,428	272	
1924	39,467	970	
1925	39,773	877	
1926	42,195	978	
1927	43,655	788	
1928	34,624	568	
1929	22,923	379	
1930	19,849	252	
1931	22,822	277	
1932	25,160	302	
1933	37,652	289	
1934	44,401	242	
1935	50,132	193	
1936	52,640	259	
1937	54,282	229	
1938	53,482	225	
1939	50,563	219	
1940	47,008		
1941	49,517	276	
1942	62,749	315	
1943	155,392	393	
1944	150,522	279	
1945	74,814	316	
1946	73,727	280	
1947	45,303	411	
1948	42,719	577	
1949	40,548	713	
1950	43,402	475	
2011	1,052 per weekday		
2019	269,000		

== Services ==
Auckland One Rail, on behalf of Auckland Transport, operates South City line services to Newmarket.

Daily long-distance Te Huia services between Auckland and Hamilton stop at Pukekohe Station.

== See also ==
- List of Auckland railway stations
- Public transport in Auckland
