= Waitematā railway station =

Train station in Auckland, New Zealand

Waitematā
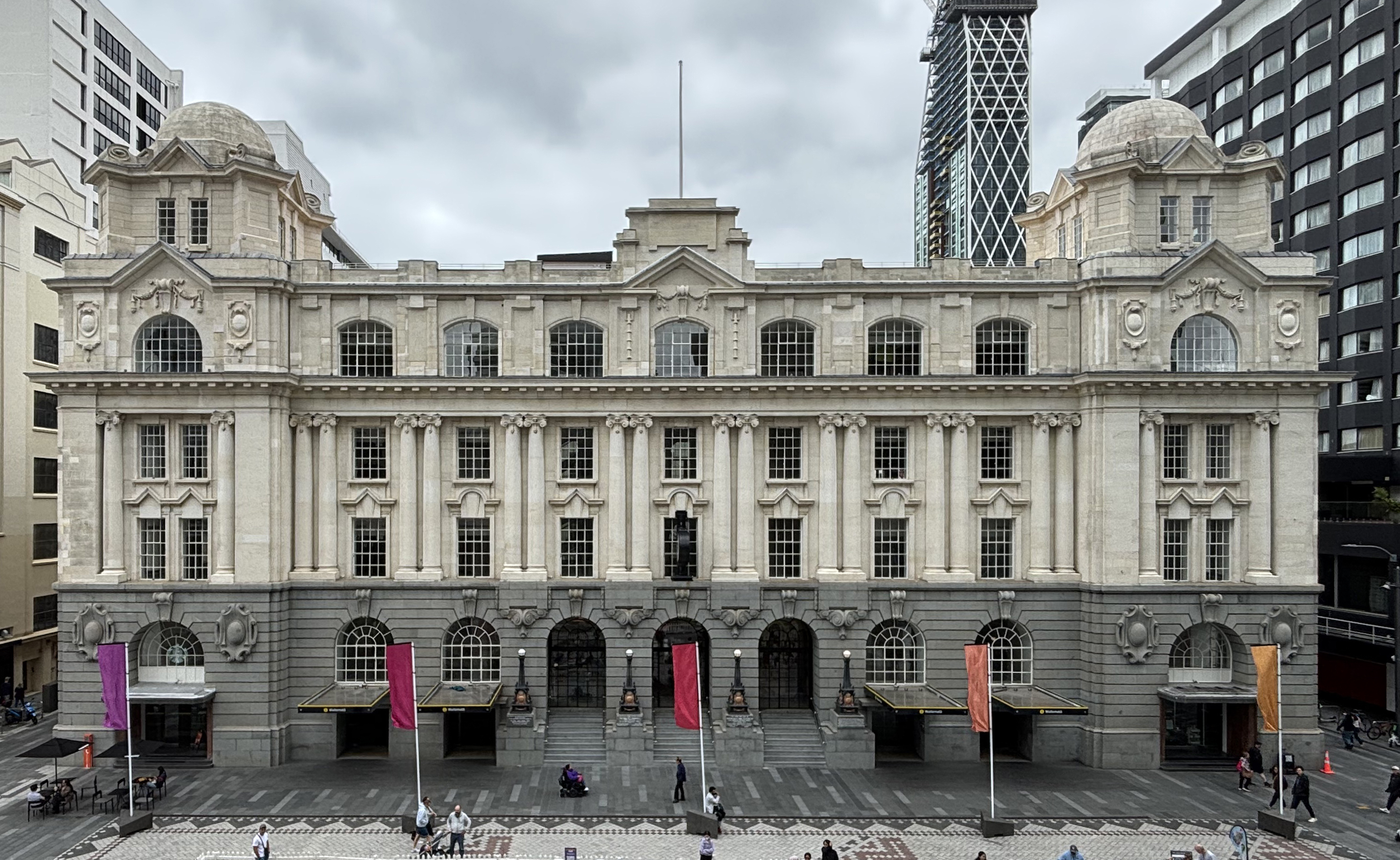
- The historic former Chief Post Office building is the main entrance of the railway station.

General information
- Other names: Britomart
- Location: Auckland CBD; New Zealand
- Coordinates: 36°50′40″S 174°46′09″E
- System: Auckland Transport Urban rail
- Owner: Auckland Transport
- Operator: Auckland One Rail
- Lines: North Island Main Trunk (NIMT); Newmarket Line
- Distance: 681.82 km (423.66 mi) from Wellington (NIMT)
- Platforms: Through platforms (P1 & P4); Bay platforms (P2 & P3)
- Tracks: 2

Construction
- Structure type: Underground
- Depth: 11 m (36 ft)
- Parking: No
- Cycle facilities: Yes
- Accessible: Yes (Lifts)

Other information
- Station code: AKD
- Fare zone: City

History
- Opened: 7 July 2003; 23 years ago
- Electrified: 2014
- Former names: Britomart Transport Centre

Key dates
- 2001: Construction commenced
- 2003: Opened
- 2017: City Rail Link works begin
- 2021: Surface building renovation completed
- 2026: City Rail Link opened

Passengers
- CY 2018: 10,224,759

Services
| Preceding station | Auckland Transport (Auckland One Rail) | Following station |
|---|---|---|
| Te Waihorotiu towards Swanson | East West Line | Ōrākei towards Manukau |
| Te Waihorotiu towards Pukekohe | South City Line | Parnell towards Newmarket |
Former services (pre-2026)
| Preceding station | Auckland Transport (Auckland One Rail) | Following station |
|---|---|---|
| Terminus | Eastern Line pre-2026 | Ōrākei towards Manukau |
| Terminus | Southern Line pre-2026 | Parnell towards Pukekohe |
| Terminus | Western Line pre-2026 | Parnell towards Swanson |

Heritage New Zealand – Category 1
- Designated: 11 July 1986
- Reference no.: 101
Location

Waitematā railway station, formerly known as Britomart Station and before that as Britomart Transport Centre, is an underground station of the Auckland railway network. Serving as a public transport interchange, it is located at the foot of Queen Street, the main commercial thoroughfare of the central city, with the main ferry terminal just across Quay Street, and several bus stops located near the station.

At the time of its inception in the early 2000s the station was Auckland's largest transport project ever, built to move rail access closer to the city's centre and help boost Auckland's low usage of public transport.

Waitematā was converted from a terminus to a through station following the 2026 opening of the City Rail Link, with lines running through two tunnels beneath the city centre.

== History ==
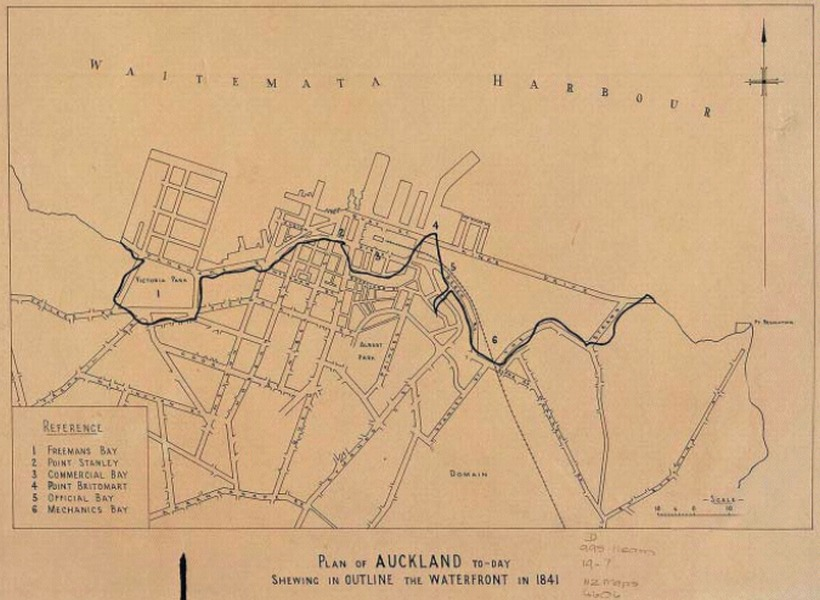
Commercial Bay and surrounding waterfront, c. 1930, with the older coastline shown as a darker line

=== First Auckland station ===
Following a survey in 1862, the Auckland and Drury Railway Act 1863 was passed on 14 December 1863 "to enable the Superintendent of the Province of Auckland to construct a Railway between the Towns of Auckland and Drury with a Branch to Onehunga in the said Province." The initial route proposed was from an Auckland terminus outside Fort Britomart, but the Auckland Provincial Engineer–in-chief recommended in 1864 that the terminus should be near Wynyard Place instead.

The first Auckland station opened in 1873, as the northern terminus of the Auckland and Onehunga Railway. This eight-mile railway was the first "Government owned and operated railway in the North Island for the conveyance of the Public". By 1874 the main line had reached Drury.

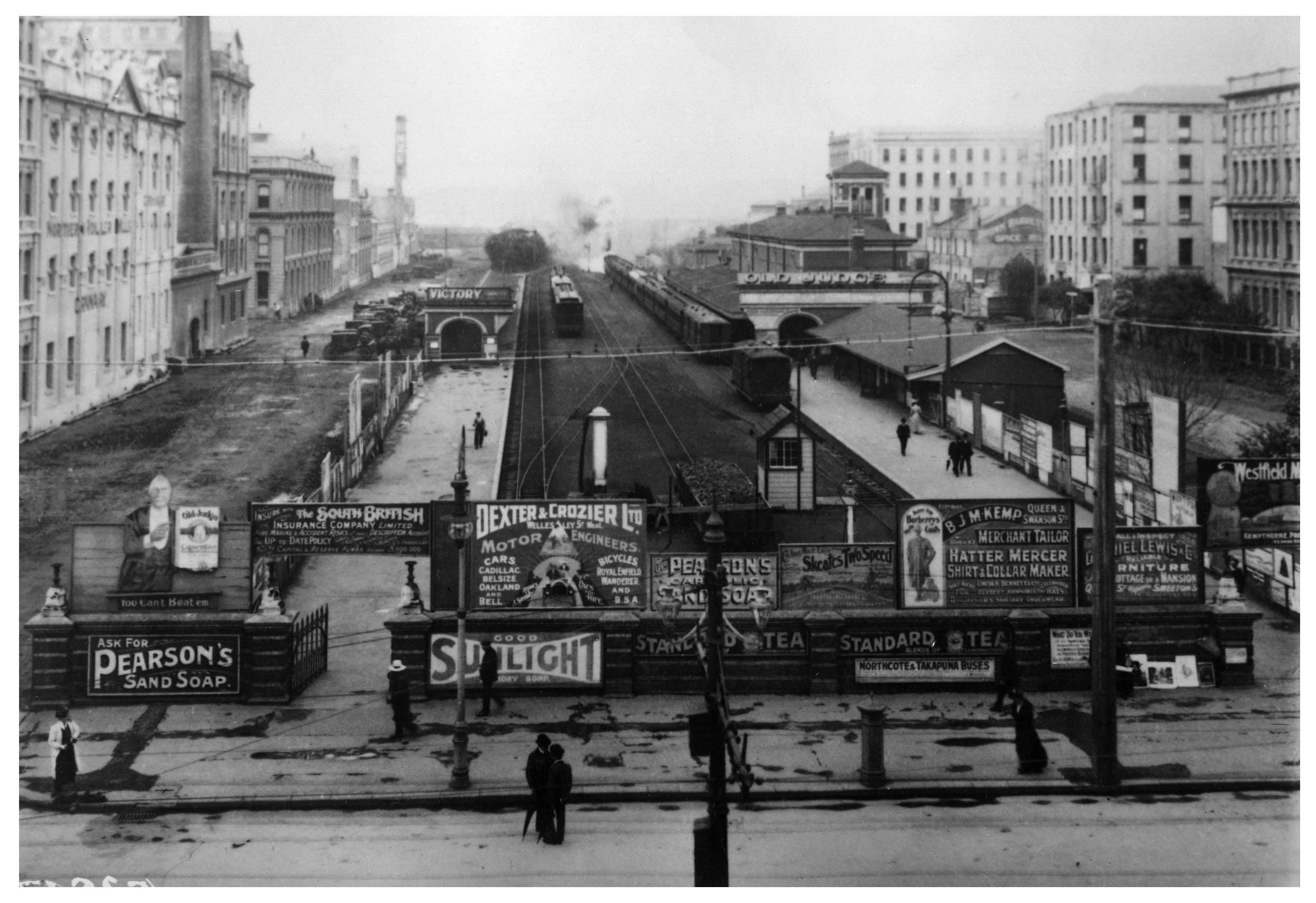
Queen Street frontage of Auckland Station, 1904

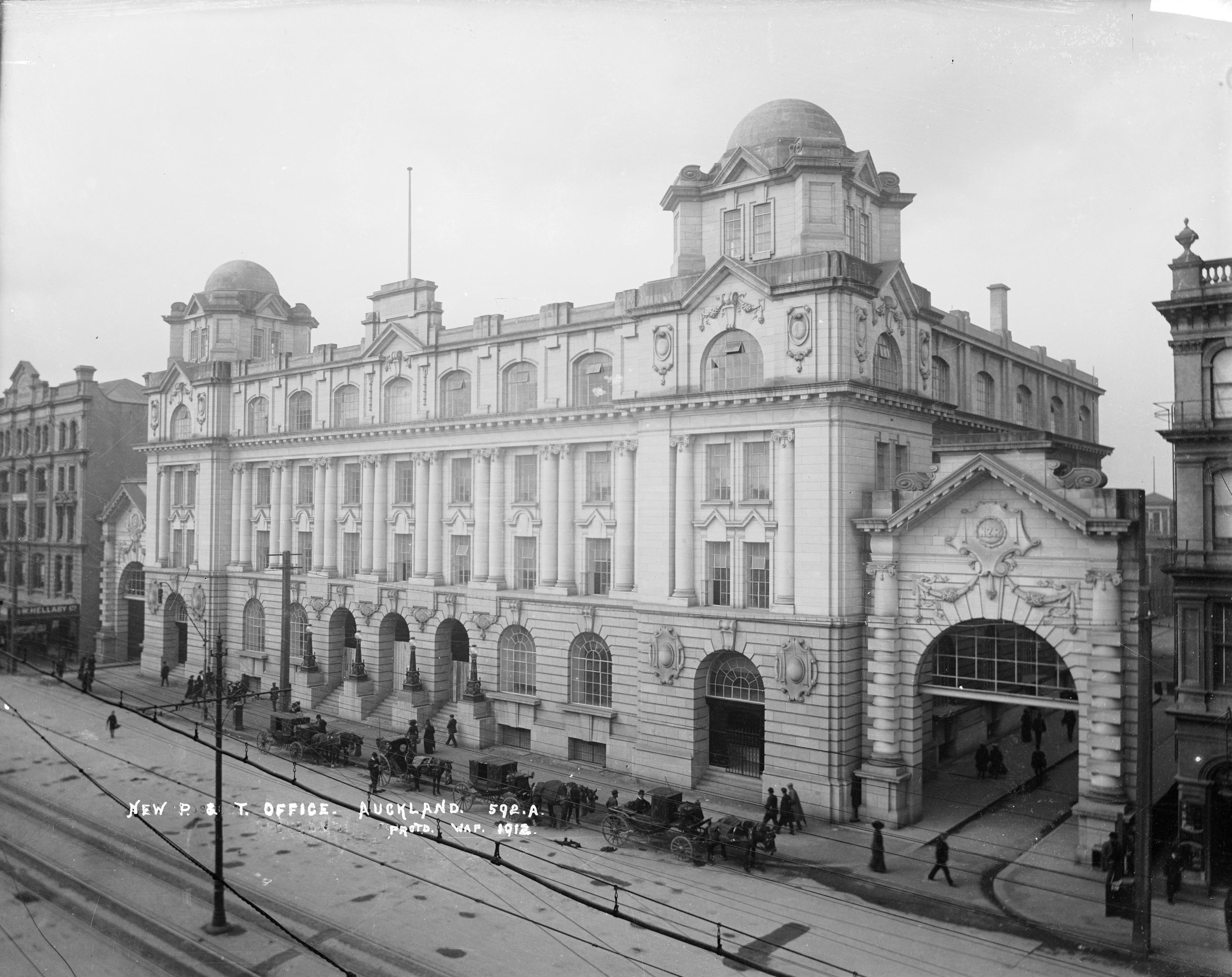
Chief Post Office building, between entrances to the railway station, 1912

=== Queen Street railway terminus ===
In the 1870s and 1880s Point Britomart was quarried to produce fill for land reclamation in order to extend the railway line to the bottom of Queen Street.

In 1885, the station was moved west from its original 1873 site to the newly reclaimed land, in the middle of what was once Commercial Bay, with a frontage to Queen Street.

It remained there after the Chief Post Office was built in 1912.

After closure, the site became a bus terminal in 1937, and a car park in 1958.

=== Beach Road ===
A new Auckland railway station was built by the New Zealand Public Works Department between 1928 and 1930, on Beach Road. The grand and ornate building was intended to serve as a gateway to the city, and its construction cost of £320,000 was the largest independent contract awarded in New Zealand.

The station was given a wide variety of amenities, from waiting and dining rooms to shops and a first aid station. Underpasses and ramps linked the station building with an extended platform network to the rear, with concrete canopies.

=== Proposals and planning ===
Many proposals were made to locate the station closer to the central city, most notably in 1973 and 1987. The 1973 proposal envisaged a tunnel loop with an underground station at Britomart, but was stopped by the Third National Government, which claimed it was unjustified and too costly. In 1995, Auckland City Council purchased the old Chief Post Office building (PostBank offices closed in 1988, though some postal services remained open beyond that year) and proposed to redevelop the area as a transit centre.

Early designs called for both the bus terminal and the railway to be underground, but these plans were scrapped as consultation showed that buses were preferred above ground by both users and operators, and projected costs soared, partly due to the difficulties with potential water ingress. The developer eventually defaulted on contractual deadlines, and the project failed.

In 1998, a cheaper option was decided on, partly after a consultation process with stakeholders and citizens. The architectural design was chosen via a competition. It used part of Queen Elizabeth II Square and surrounding streets as a bus interchange, with the existing dilapidated bus terminal redeveloped to incorporate both bus services and a pedestrianised area. When nearby Quay Street was realigned in the late 1990s, a tunnel was built (completed in 2000) to provide the underground railway link. Bus services using the old bus terminal were diverted to other locations in June 2001.

The project name was officially coined the Waitemata Waterfront Interchange.

=== Construction ===
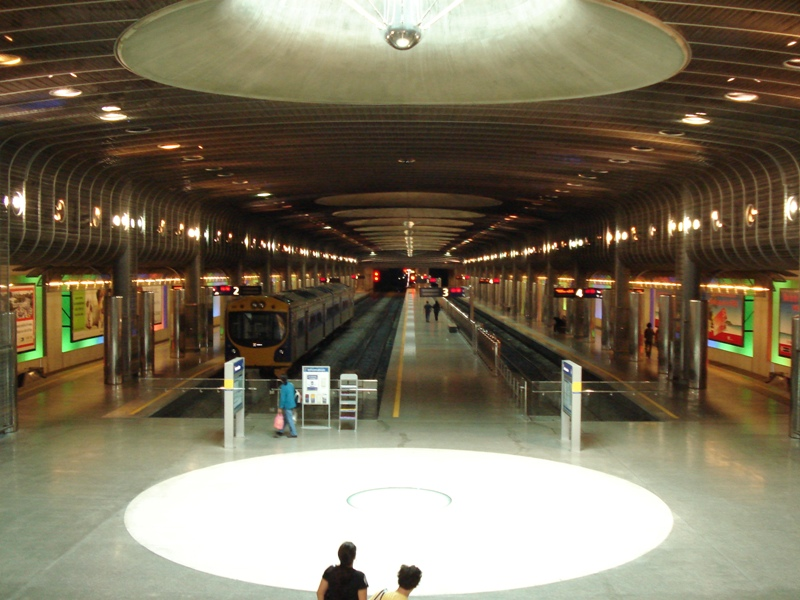
The underground platforms before electrification, 2007

Construction commenced in October 2001. It involved 14 km of piling, some being 40 m long and driven 16 m into the underlying bedrock, mainly to provide good earthquake protection, and to futureproof the area for potential later construction of buildings on top of the station. 200,000 cubic metres were excavated for the station, and 40,000 cubic metres of concrete poured. Approximately 2 kilometres (1.2 mi) of new rail track was built, of which half was in a cut and cover tunnel. The station has a site area of 5.2 ha and includes 236 m^{2} retail area.

The station opened to passengers on 7 July 2003, with the official opening on 25 July 2003 by Sir Edmund Hillary and government ministers. Services to the Beach Road terminus ceased, except for some peak-time commuter services and excursion trains using the former Platform 4 (originally Platform 7), renamed 'The Strand'. The commuter services ceased after a few months.

A major commercial building was built over the eastern approach tunnel in the late 2000s, at the eastern edge of the plaza behind the station.

It is one of the few underground railway stations in the world designed for use by diesel trains, although their use is now restricted.

=== Electrification ===
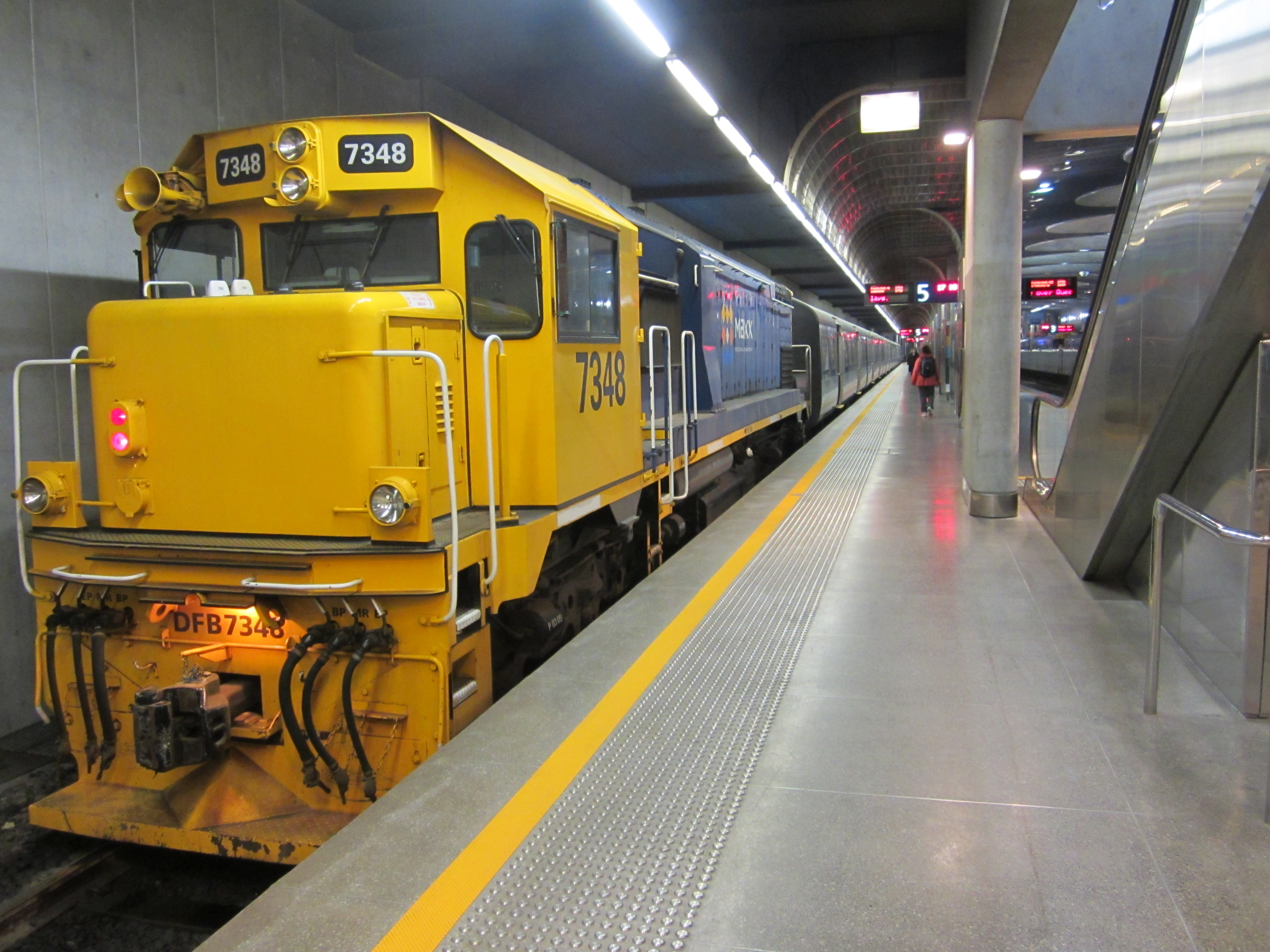
Diesel locomotive with passenger carriages, 2012

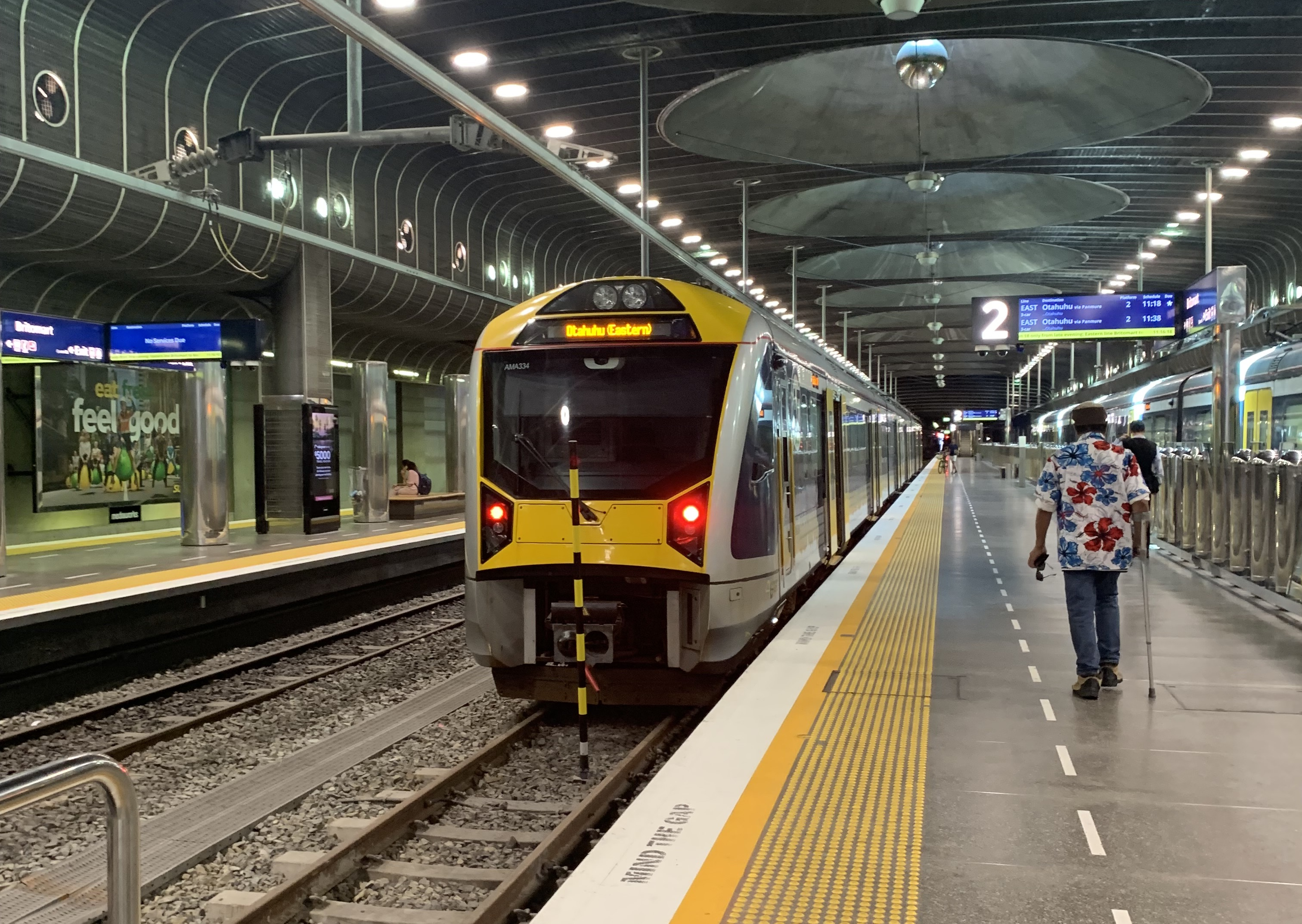
AM class EMU, 2024

It was announced on 17 May 2007 that electrification of Auckland's rail network would proceed. Installation of overhead wires began later, with Auckland Transport (initially ARTA) purchasing new electric units to replace the diesel trains. The project was expected to be completed in 2013.

The station was officially electrified on 31 March 2014, with New Zealand's Prime Minister, John Key, flipping the switch in a commemorative ceremony. The first electric passenger services began running four weeks later, between Britomart and Onehunga on the Onehunga Line on 28 April 2014.

From July 2015, all suburban trains serving the Britomart were operated by AM Class EMUs, leaving the thrice-weekly Northern Explorer as the only diesel service using the station. By December 2015, the station required a $600,000 upgrade to its diesel extraction fans and Auckland Transport requested that KiwiRail, the operator of the Northern Explorer, fund the upgrade if they wished to continue serving the station. KiwiRail decided that the cost was not justifiable and from 21 December 2015 they ceased serving Britomart and relocated their Auckland terminus to The Strand, in the east of the CBD.

=== Name change ===
In March 2023, following a joint submission to the New Zealand Geographic Board by AT and City Rail Link Limited, the station's unofficial name, Britomart Station, was officially changed to Waitematā Railway Station. The new name was gifted by local Māori and refers to the nearby Waitematā Harbour. The transitional name Waitematā (Britomart) was initially used. Since 21 September 2025, Auckland Transport has referred to the station as Waitematā.

=== City Rail Link ===
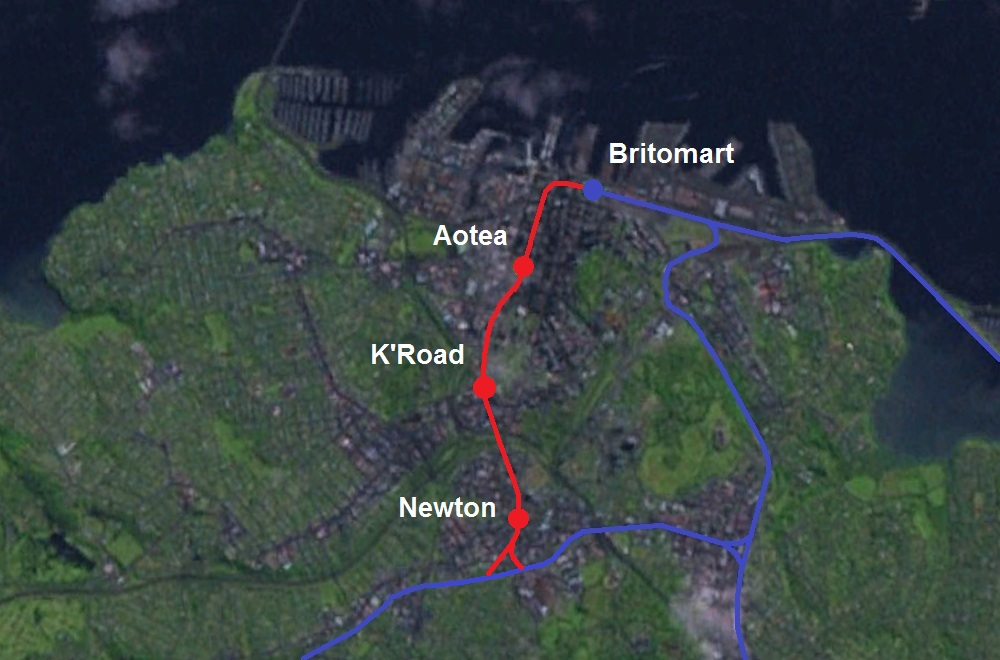
Early City Rail Link plan. The proposed Newton station was later dropped.

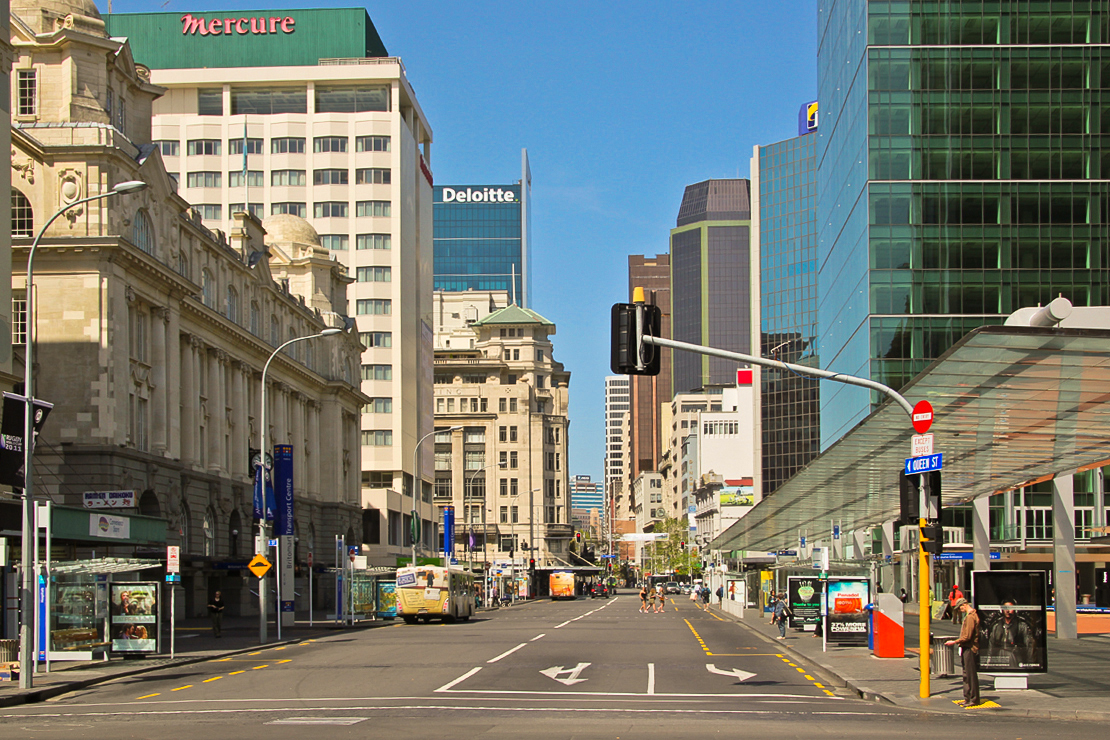
Looking southward up Queen Street, 2010. Entrance to the underpass is beneath the canopy on the right.

The City Rail Link was a project to build a 3.45-kilometre-long (2.14 mi) twin-tunnel rail link underneath Auckland's city centre, extending the North Island Main Trunk railway line through the station to a junction with the North Auckland Line. Planned since 2013, construction began in 2018. The works converted the station from a terminus to a through station.

The Downtown Shopping Centre was closed on 28 May 2016. By 23 November it had been demolished. It was later replaced by a skyscraper and shopping centre. Auckland Council struck a deal with the owners to build the new rail tunnels directly beneath the premises.

Until early 2016, bus stops were located on Queen Street in front of the former Chief Post Office building. The station was originally built with a short pedestrian walkway under the street, to an entrance beneath a sizeable rain-proof canopy that ran northward toward the ferry terminal and southward toward the Queen Street-Customs Street intersection. It was closed to pedestrians from 29 March 2016 in order to facilitate preliminary works for the City Rail Link. In late 2020, the area was reopened as a new public square named Te Komititanga.

On 17 January 2017, the former Chief Post Office building was closed and access between it and platforms were blocked off. A temporary entrance was opened at the rear of the building, with new stairways and the retention of elevator and escalator access to the platforms. This building was in use for three years while the former building was refurbished and strengthened in preparation for City Rail Link (CRL) tunnel works. On 6 April 2021 the building was officially reopened with a ribbon cutting ceremony attended by Mayor Phil Goff.

In June 2022, the number of serviceable platforms was reduced to enable the two outermost platforms (1 and 5) to be connected to the tunnels for the CRL and become through platforms. As a result of this, Onehunga line services were shortened to terminate at Newmarket instead of Britomart.

In December 2025, the eastern entrance to the station was blessed by Ngāti Whātua Ōrākei. The entrance, which opened in January 2026, opens out to the Waitematā Station Plaza above the station.

When the CRL opened in September 2026 it was New Zealand's biggest-ever transport infrastructure project, and Waitematā became a through station, with East West and South City lines running through the two tunnels beneath the city centre to Maungawhau Station.

== Capacity ==
The station was designed to serve up to 10,500 passengers during the peak hour as a terminus. Capacity of the five platforms was constrained by the 9.3 m width of the 426 m long double-track access tunnel. Early forecasts predicted that while double-tracking of the surrounding rail network would improve peak time train congestion, the capacity of the corridor would not be reached until about 2020. Growth in train patronage and increased services resulted in the tunnel being at maximum capacity from 2011, almost 10 years earlier than predicted.

A proposal to increase capacity was the duplication of the existing eastern Britomart approach tunnel. This would have required a new twin track tunnel approximately 500 metres long to be constructed parallel to the existing twin-track access tunnel, resulting in four tracks from Quay Park Junction and retaining Britomart as a terminus. Estimated costs were $150 million to $200 million, with 4–5 years to plan and build.

A feature that came into operation in 2011 that allowed an increase in capacity is 'bi-directional signalling', which allows a train to leave on the same track on which it entered – freeing it from having to cross over other tracks which may not be safely clear of other trains.

In July 2015, it was reported that the number of trains able to enter and leave the station was 20 per hour. Patronage on Auckland's rail network increased from 2.5 million journeys in July 2003 to just over 14.2 million in July 2015, and by April 2017 had reached 19 million journeys.

The station's passenger capacity was reduced in 2025 by a fire safety management plan. Despite originally having five platforms, only three of these platforms can be occupied by 6-car trains at any point in time, to limit the number of passengers in the underground area.

With the opening of the CRL, most trains no longer terminate at Waitematā. Platforms 1 and 4 are the through platforms, while platforms 2 and 3 are dedicated stabling platforms. CRL has increased peak capacity to 19,000 passengers an hour.

== Architecture ==
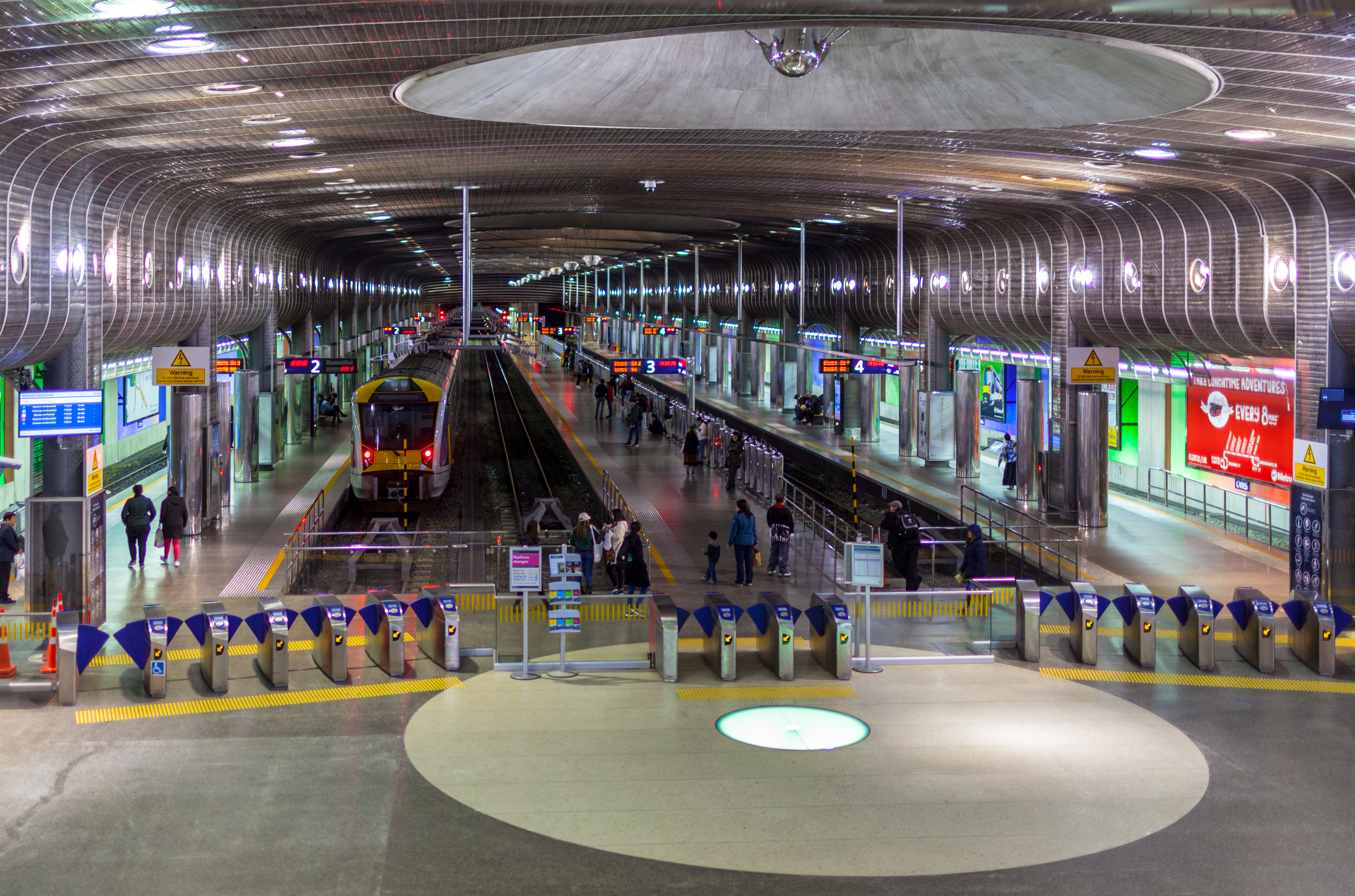
The underground platforms after electrification, 2017

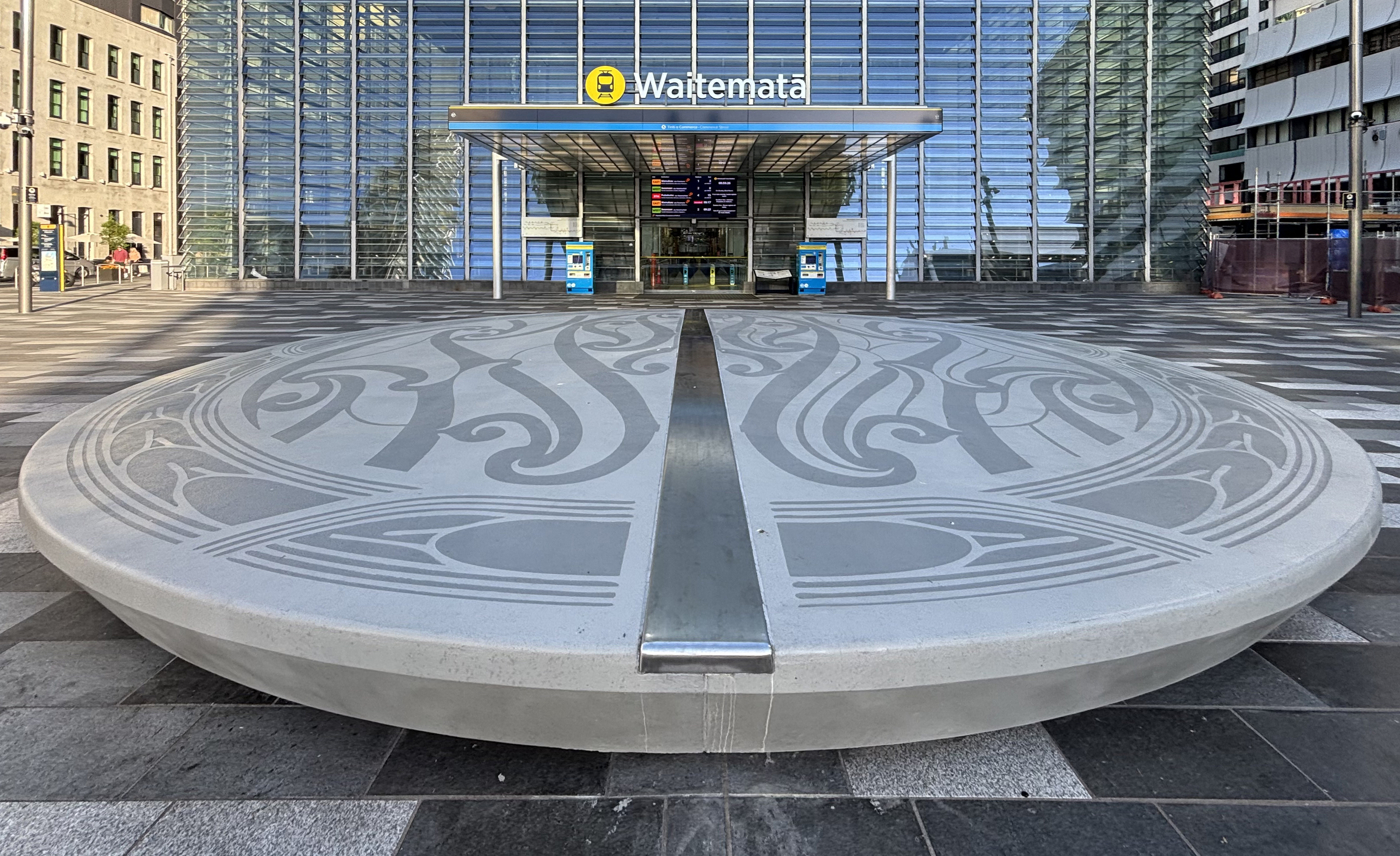
Waitī Waitā, in Waitematā Station Plaza

The Chief Post Office was designed by architect John Campbell in an Edwardian baroque style, using Oamaru stone on a base of Coromandel granite. It was registered as a Category I heritage building by Heritage New Zealand on 11 July 1986, with registration number 101.

The station was designed by California architect Mario Madayag in collaboration with local Auckland architects Jasmax, with structural design having been provided by OPUS. It combines a railway station in the former post office building, extended with expansive modernist architectural elements. The station was the result of many design iterations, some of them being substantially larger and including an underground bus terminal and a large underground car park. Political concerns and cost implications meant that those concepts did not proceed.

The civic square in front of the station, Te Komititanga, incorporates whāriki (woven mat) patterns, developed in partnership with Ngāi Tai ki Tāmaki weaver Tessa Harris, who developed the patterns in collaboration with weavers from Te Ākitai Waiohua, Ngāi Tai ki Tamaki, Ngāti Te Ata and Ngāti Whātua Ōrākei.

The Waitematā Station Plaza above the station features a 31-tonne concrete artwork called Waitī Waitā by artist Graham Tipene that features a design of Waihorotiu Stream and Waitematā Harbour coming together.

=== Awards ===
Awards that the station has received:

- 2004 Property Council of New Zealand – Merit Award, Special Purposes Category
- 2004 American Institute of Architecture – Architectural Record / Business Week International Winner
- 2004 New Zealand Institute of Architects – Resene Award, Community and Cultural
- 2004 New Zealand Institute of Architects – Resene Award, Heritage and Conservation
- 2004 Illuminating Engineering Society of Australia and New Zealand – Lighting Award
- 2004 New Zealand Concrete Society – Concrete Award
- 2005 New Zealand Institute of Architects – Resene New Zealand Award for Architecture, Community & Cultural
- 2007 Kenneth F. Brown Asia Pacific Culture and Architecture Design Award – Honorable mention

== Services ==
=== Trains ===
Auckland One Rail operates the Auckland suburban rail network on behalf of Auckland Transport. Waitematā is served by East West line trains to Swanson and Manukau and South City line trains to Pukekohe and Newmarket.

=== Buses and ferries ===
Waitematā serves as a major interchange between trains, buses and ferries. There are several bus stops located near the station in the Britomart precinct. Some bus services depart from other city centre locations including Queen Street, Wellesley Street, Customs Street and Lower Albert Street. The location name for the Britomart precinct bus arrivals and departures remains 'Britomart', and has not changed as a result of the station being renamed 'Waitematā'.

Across Quay Street from the station is the Auckland Ferry Terminal, which is the main hub for Auckland's ferry system. There are ferry services to suburbs including Devonport, Birkenhead and Half Moon Bay, as well as to islands in the Hauraki Gulf such as Waiheke Island and Rangitoto Island.

== In popular culture ==
In the mid-2000s, the station was featured in a large number of locally-produced music videos, which was attributed to the station's unique design. These included in music videos by artists Atlas, Dei Hamo, Fast Crew, and Greg Johnson. In 2023, American rapper Lil Uzi Vert included part of the station's above-ground skylights in a music video for song Red Moon. The station also appeared in The Man Who Lost His Head, a 2007 film starring Martin Clunes, in which it stood in for the London Underground.

== See also ==
- Public transport in Auckland
- Transport in Auckland
- List of Auckland railway stations
