= List of tunnels in New Zealand =

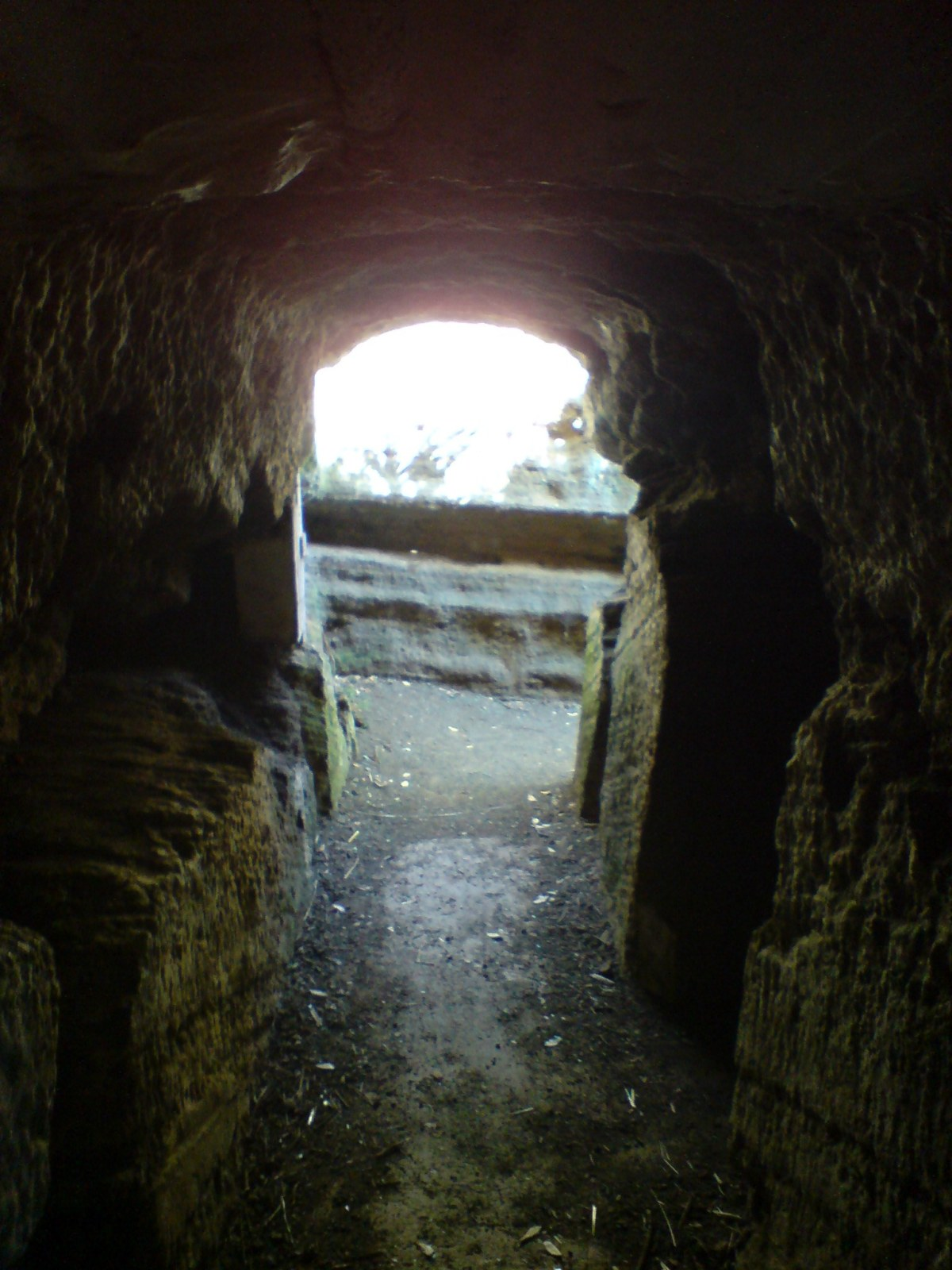
North Head Tunnel System under the South Battery area, Devonport, Auckland, 2006

This is a list of railway, road, and waterway tunnels, including hydroelectric intakes and tailraces and gun battery tunnels, in New Zealand. It includes artificial chambers but excludes New Zealand caves and New Zealand mines.

== For hydroelectric usage ==
- Manapouri Power Station – Machine hall 111 m long, 18 m wide, 34 m high, and road access tunnel 2040 m long, 6.7 m wide and high, with a semi-circular arch roof.
- Manapouri tailrace – 2 tunnels – original tailrace tunnel 9817 m long, 9.2 m diameter horseshoe section, commenced 1964, breakthrough 1968 drill-and-blast construction, 16 deaths. Second tailrace tunnel 9829 m long, 10.05 m diameter, circular section, commenced 1997, breakthrough 2001, commissioned April 2002, tunnel boring machine construction, 0 deaths.
- Tongariro Power Scheme. The scheme includes numerous canals and ten tunnels, the longest of which – the 19.2 km (11.9 mi) Moawhango-Tongariro Tunnel – is the country's longest.

== For wastewater usage ==
- Central Interceptor – 16.2 km – 4.5 m diameter – Point Erin to Mangere Wastewater Treatment Plant, Auckland – Currently under construction for Watercare Services Ltd, est completion 2026
  - An additional two connecting link sewers of 2.1 & 2.3 m diameter, length 4.3 km

== For military usage ==
- North Head tunnels, Auckland
- Whangaparaoa Navy Camp, two sets of tunnels, Auckland
- Stony Batter, Waiheke Island, Auckland
- Wrights Hill Fortress, Wellington
- Cracroft Caverns – Chamber, Christchurch
- Godley Head, Christchurch
- Cashin Quay – Extensive network in midway hillside, Lyttelton
- Taiaroa Head and Harington Point, Dunedin

=== For air raid shelters ===
USAF or RNZAF owned

- Albert Park tunnels, Albert Park Volcano, Albert Park, Auckland – built to shelter civilians in the event of an air raid

== For transportation ==
=== Rail tunnels ===
Longest bored tunnels

From longest to shortest.

1. Kaimai – 8879 m – opened 12 September 1978 – near Apata on the East Coast Main Trunk railway line to Tauranga, the longest rail tunnel in New Zealand.
2. Rimutaka – 8798 m – opened 3 November 1955 – between Upper Hutt (Wellington) and Featherston (Wairarapa), replaced the Rimutaka Incline, a Fell mountain railway, the longest tunnel in New Zealand that carries regular passenger trains.
3. Otira – 8566 m – opened 1923 – between Arthur's Pass and Otira, in the Southern Alps on the transalpine Midland line – continuous 1 in 33 grade – electrified until 1997.
4. Tawa No 2 – 4324 m – opened 1935, goods on one line, 1937 all traffic – longest double-track tunnel in New Zealand. Between Ngauranga (Wellington) and Glenside (Tawa). With the Tawa No 1 Tunnel (1238 m), part of the Tawa Flat deviation.
5. City Rail Link – 3740 m (northbound) and 3720 m (southbound) – opened 13 September 2026, between Quay Park Junction and Maungawhau Station, Auckland.
6. Tikiwhata – 2989 m – opened 1943, between Wairoa and Gisborne.
7. Lyttelton – 2596 m – opened 9 December 1867, between Heathcote Valley (Christchurch) and Lyttelton.
8. Turakina – 2091 m – opened 1947, between Marton and Whanganui.

Shortest bored tunnels

1. A 39.83 m long tunnel – opened 1906, between Staircase and Avoca, Midland line.
2. A 42.05 m long tunnel – opened 1891, near Woodville, in the Manawatū Gorge – was daylighted in 2008.

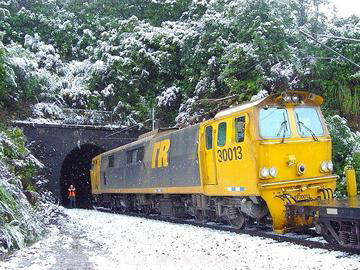
An EF electric locomotive on the North Island Main Trunk line, 2006

Other rail tunnels

- Purewa Tunnel, an 800m tunnel on the Eastern Line in Auckland
- Poro-O-Tarao Tunnel an 1,272m tunnel on the North Island Main Trunk line in the King Country (replacing an 1880s tunnel)

Disused rail tunnels, North Island

- On the Wairarapa line before the opening of the Rimutaka Tunnel in 1955:
  - Cruickshanks – opened 1 January 1878, between Mangaroa and Upper Hutt.
  - Mangaroa – 152 m – opened 1 January 1878, at Tunnel Gully recreation area, Te Mārua, Upper Hutt. Now a walkway.
  - Summit – 584 m, and three shorter tunnels (Pakuratahi, Siberia, Prices) :opened 12 October 1878 on the Rimutaka Incline. On the Rimutaka Rail Trail.
- Okaihau – on the never-opened extension of the Okaihau Branch to Rangiahua, unused but can be walked through – easily spotted from SH1 passing Okaihau township. This tunnel is part of the Opua to Horeke Cycleway
- Parnell Tunnel – single track, on the Newmarket Line, adjacent to the current double-track tunnel. Closed, with no public access.
- Karangahake – 1100 m, in the Karangahake Gorge, on the former East Coast Main Trunk, closed in 1978. Now a combined walkway and cycle path (part of the Hauraki Rail Trail).
- No.8 tunnel bypassed in 1985 by the Mangaonoho Deviation of the North Island Main Trunk. (The first seven tunnel numbers are from the Johnsonville Branch, the former NIMT line.)
- No.19 tunnel daylighted in 1972, on the section of line bypassed in 1985 by the Mangaonoho Deviation of the North Island Main Trunk.
- No.9 tunnel opened out (day-lighted) at the west end of the Makohine Viaduct in 1984, on the North Island Main Trunk.
- No.10A, 10B, 10C, 10D, 10E, 10F tunnels bypassed in 1981 by the Mangaweka Deviation of the North Island Main Trunk. All are on private land.
- No.11 tunnel south of Taihape bypassed in 1985 by a deviation of the North Island Main Trunk.
- No.12 (Hedgehog) tunnel north of Taihape bypassed in 1985 by a deviation of the North Island Main Trunk. Adjacent to State Highway 1. Tunnel no longer exists after a realignment of SH1.
- No.15 tunnel bypassed in 1987 by the Ohakune-Horopito deviation of the North Island Main Trunk. Accessible from one end only.
- Mercer tunnel daylighted in 1937. (A total of 13 tunnels have been removed from the NIMT from Mangaonoho to Mercer. The total length of these removed tunnels is 2,642 metres.)
- Poro-O-Tarao Tunnel – 1071 m, replaced by new tunnel on a deviation in 1980.
- Four tunnels on the closed Moutohora Branch, lengths (Nos 1 to 4); 185m, 258m, 45m, 90m. One tunnel is accessible on a public walkway, the others can be viewed from public roads.
- Historically one or more tunnels may have been built on the closed Ngatapa Branch but no trace exists today.
- No 24 tunnel on the Palmerston North – Gisborne line – 123 m long (collapsed).
- No 12 tunnel – 27m, on the Wellington & Manawatu Railway (now Kāpiti section of NIMT) between Paekākāriki and Paraparaumu – abandoned in 1900.
- No. 3, 4 and 5 tunnels on the Palmerston North Gisborne line were daylighted in 2007.
- No.4 (Kai Iwi) tunnel on the Marton New Plymouth Line was bypassed in 2008.
- Approximately 3 or more tunnels in the Mamaku Ranges East of Putaruru that were used for logging purposes. All believed to have been closed around the 1950s. One has partially collapsed and rest are overgrown at their entrances

Disused rail tunnels, South Island

- Hunts Road – former Catlins River Branch, 221 m long. Public walkway access. This was the southernmost tunnel in New Zealand.
- Glenham Branch, 301 m long. Possible public access. The second most southerly tunnel.
- Spooners Range Tunnel – 1352 m long, on the closed Nelson Section. Accessible by public walkway, this is the longest disused rail tunnel in New Zealand.
- Kawatiri Tunnel – 185 m long, also on the closed Nelson Section. Accessible by public walkway.
- No 4 Tunnel – south of Oaro township on the Main North Line. Access on foot south of township via a railway bridge.
- Chasm Creek – former Seddonville Branch. Accessible by public walkway.
- Charming Creek – former private coal railway. Accessible by public walkway.
- Former coal tramways at Stockton and Denniston. Public access.
- Cape Foulwind – former quarry line. Public access but tunnel has largely collapsed.
- Rewanui Incline – two short tunnels now used by access road.
- Puketeraki – 157 m long. Line deviated around in a cutting. Partly collapsed and ends have been fenced over. Abandoned about 1936
- Roseneath, Dunedin – 101 m long, line deviated through new tunnel. Status unknown. Appears to have been filled in at entrances.
- Caversham, Tunnel History Dunedin – 865 m long, line deviated through new double-track tunnel. Public access to both ends but it is quite muddy. The access down the steps between intersections with Ensor Street and Townleys Road has been fenced off, but easy to get under, on the opposite side of the road to the Caversham entrance of the current tunnel. In November 2026, Dunedin City Council announced they will put in $1m of upgrades to re-open tunnel as part of the Dunedin Tunnels Trail
- Chain Hills (Wingatui) – 462 m long, line deviated through new double-track tunnel.Tunnel Images Tunnel reopened in 2025 as part of the Dunedin Tunnels Trail
- Three tunnels on the Otago Central Rail Trail (former Otago Central Railway), ranging in length from 152 to 229 m. All have public access.
- Three tunnels on the former Roxburgh Branch ranging from 226 to 443 m. All three tunnels are now part of a rail trail with public access.
- Rakis and Tapui Tunnels on the former Tokarahi Branch. Can be seen from roads, on private land.
- Conical Hill – 71 m long, on the former Tapanui Branch. Public access through walkway.
- Tunnel Hill Historic Reserve – between Balclutha to Owaka, 200 m long, public access through walkway.
- No.22 Tunnel on the Main North Line. Daylighted in 1981.
- No.23 Tunnel on the Main North Line. Daylighted in 1979.

=== Road tunnels ===
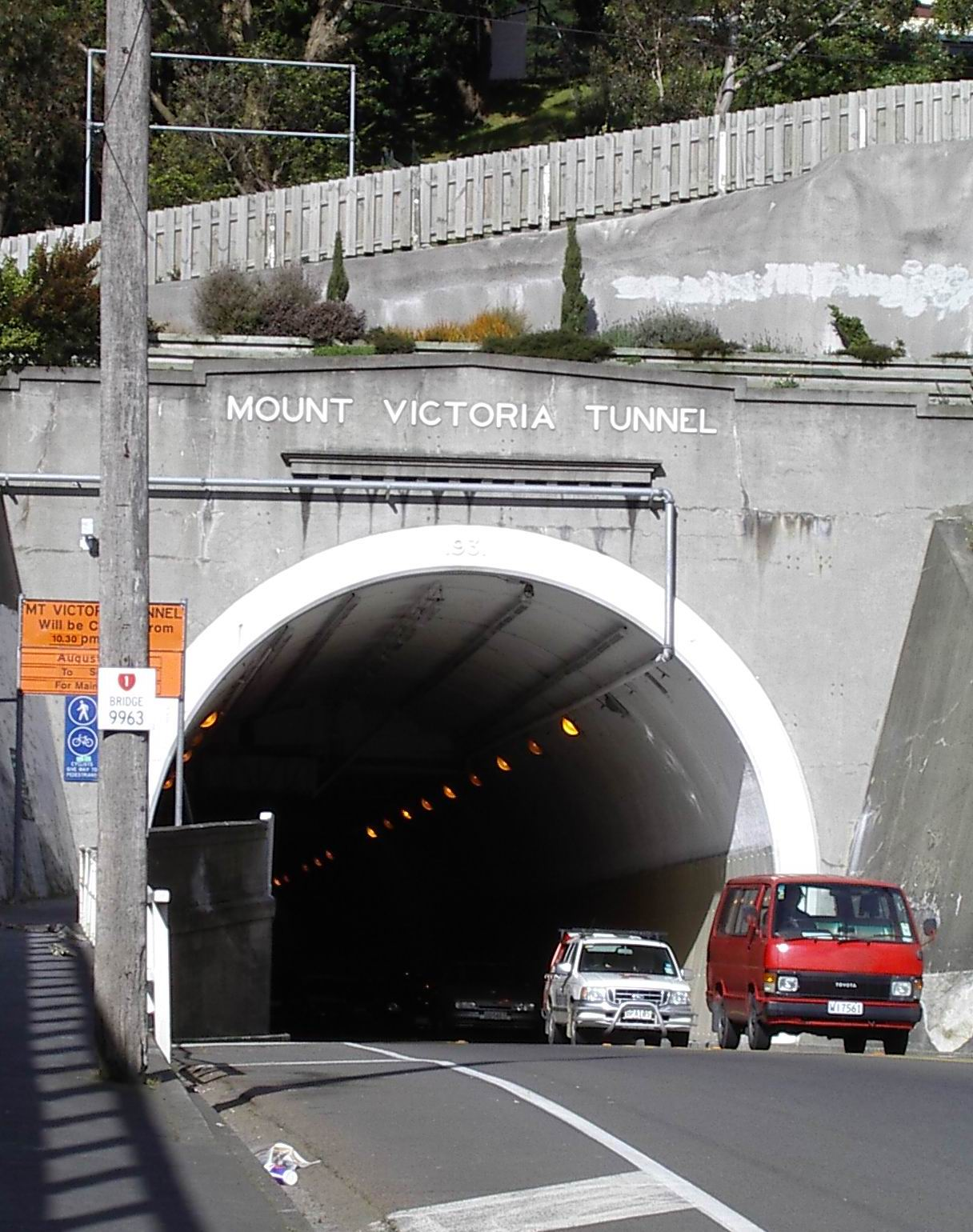
Western portal of SH 1 Mount Victoria Tunnel, Wellington

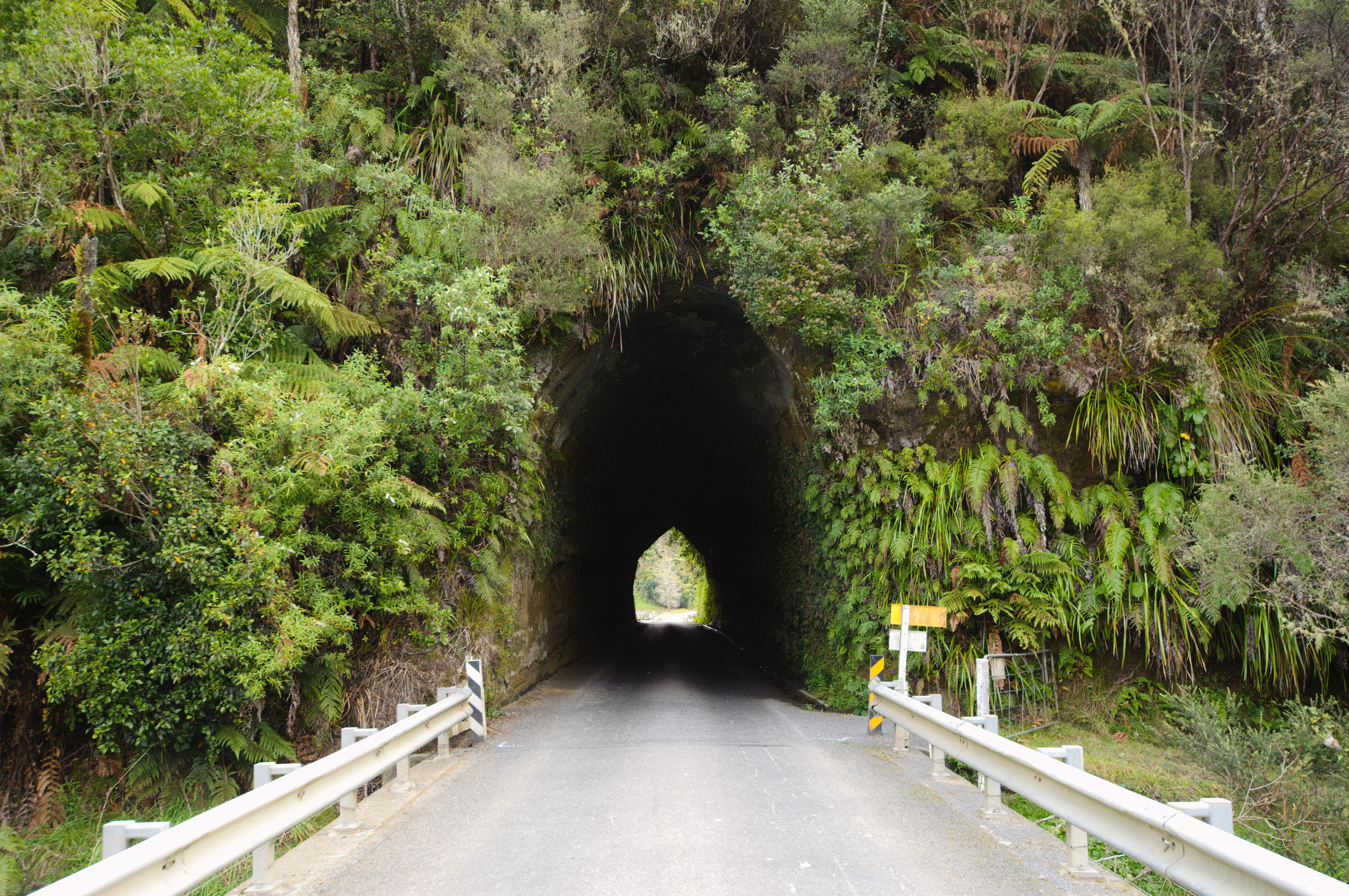
Eastern portal of the Okau Tunnel, standing on the bridge

On State Highways

- Arras Tunnel – on SH 1 underneath the Pukeahu National War Memorial Park in Te Aro, Wellington, three lanes northbound. Opened 29 September 2014. The tunnel is named after the town of Arras in France, under which the New Zealand Tunnelling Company dug tunnels during the First World War.
- Awakino Gorge Tunnel – on SH 3 between New Plymouth and Te Kūiti. Single lane. This tunnel was permanently closed in mid-2021, and has been bypassed by two bridges across a corner of the Awakino River, on the other side of the river to the tunnel.
- Homer Tunnel – on SH 94 between Hollyford Valley and Milford Sound, Fiordland, 1200 m long. Completed 1953, opened 1954, Mean altitude 945 m. Unlined rock.
- Johnstone's Hill Tunnels – twin tunnels on SH 1 Auckland Northern Motorway extension (Toll) near Puhoi, 340 m long. Opened 25 January 2009.
- Lyttelton road tunnel – on SH 74 under the Port Hills between Lyttelton and the Heathcote Valley in Christchurch, 1900 m long. Opened 1964.
- Moki Tunnel – on SH 43 between Whangamōmona and Taumarunui, approx 200 m long. Single lane, uses wooden shoring.
- Mount Messenger Tunnel – on SH 3 between New Plymouth and Te Kūiti. This section of State Highway 3 will be bypassed by about 5 km of new highway alignment that will include a short tunnel, east of the present tunnel. NZTA 2017
- Mount Victoria Tunnel – on SH 1 under Mount Victoria, 623 m long, opened 1931.
- Paratitahi Tunnels – twin tunnels on SH 1, 11 km south of Kaikōura.
- Raramai Tunnels – twin tunnels on SH 1, 14 km south of Kaikōura.
- Terrace Motorway Tunnel – on SH 1 under The Terrace, Wellington, 460 m long. Opened 1978, three lanes (two northbound, one southbound),
- Victoria Park Tunnel – on SH 1 in central Auckland, 440m long, 3 lanes of northbound traffic (none southbound). Opened 14 November 2011. The positioning of the tunnel allows a southbound tunnel to be built in the future (project yet to receive construction funding).
- Waterview Tunnel – on SH20 from Mt Roskill to Point Chevalier in central Auckland. At 2,400m it is the longest road tunnel in New Zealand. It opened on 2 July 2017 as part of the Waterview Connection, carrying three lanes of northbound and southbound traffic as part of Auckland's Western Ring Route.

On other roads

- Okaihau, a short tunnel north of Okaihau constructed for the Okaihau Branch railway, which is now part of the Opua to Horeke Cycleway.
- Huntly, a short tunnel just outside of Huntly on Rotowaro Road constructed under a mine-site road.
- Huia Dam Road, Waitakere Ranges. 170m road tunnel near the Upper Huia Dam, constructed around the 1920s for construction of the dam. Public vehicle access prohibited, however, Watercare vehicles and hikers can use the tunnel to access the dam.

In rural Taranaki, all single lane:

- Huinga Tunnel, near the village of the same name, provides access to an isolated valley.
- Kiwi Road tunnels: the eastern one on Kiwi Road, the western on Moki Road, near Uruti Road.
- Makahu Tunnel on Brewer Road, providing access to the small village of Makahu (white hawk).
- Matau Tunnel on Mangaoapa Road, connecting Matau and Douglas via Kiore.
- Moki Stock Tunnel, hidden away in the bush to the east of the Kiwi tunnels.
- Okau Tunnel, approximately 100 m long, on the Tongaporutu-Ōhura road 4 km from SH 3, which is unusual in that it abuts directly to a bridge.
- Tangahoe tunnel in South Taranaki – re-opened in 1997.
- Tarata Tunnel on Otaraoa Road, about 30 m long, built as the hill above was unstable.
- Te Horo stock tunnel, near the Whitecliffs walkway
- Uruti Tunnel on Uruti Road, connecting the Pehu Valley with SH 3. It is both the longest (at about 200 m) and least stable tunnel in Taranaki. It took seven years to construct and opened in 1923. Signs at each end recommend not walking through it and stopping is prohibited. It looks like a mine shaft with its inverted V-shaped top, has a wooden ceiling, and reinforcing planks along its walls.
- Whangamōmona Road tunnels, two short tunnels, 4WD only
- Fraser Smith Road tunnel. Short tunnel on gravel road near Awakino. Not to be confused with the Awakino Tunnel on State Highway 3. Provides access to nearby farms.

There are 3 other tunnels on tracks in the Taranaki area; Aukopae (closed), Graylings cattle tunnel, Waikawau beach tunnel.

In Wellington:

- Hataitai bus tunnel – 388 m long, single lane – under Mount Victoria; opened 1907 as a tram tunnel.
- Karori tunnel – 74 m long – between Kelburn and Karori; opened 1900.
- Moa Point tunnel – under the safety zone at the south end of Wellington International Airport's runway.
- Northland tunnel – 90 m long – between Northland and Karori, opened 1927.
- Seatoun tunnel – 144 m long – between Strathmore and Seatoun, opened 1907.

== Proposed or planned ==
=== Road ===
- Kaimai road tunnel – A tunnel through the Kaimai Range in order to provide a better roading connection between the Waikato and Bay of Plenty regions has been proposed. One option for this tunnel includes building it near the existing Kaimai rail tunnel.
- Wainuiomata Tunnel, part of a proposed road link between the Hutt Valley, north of Wellington, and Wainuiomata. Eventually completed as a utility tunnel.

=== Mixed use ===
- Second Harbour Crossing in Auckland, likely to be a tunnel option that could incorporate the Victoria Park Tunnel. While historically a road tunnel was seen as a priority, the present plans are likely to prioritise rail first due to capacity issues of the Northern Busway.

== Sources ==
- New Zealand Railway Tunnels at http://trains.wellington.net.nz
- New Zealand Railway Tunnels at 31 March 1975
- Exploring New Zealand's Ghost Railways, David Leitch and Brian Scott, Grantham House Publishing, Wellington (1995).
- New Zealand Railway and Tramway Atlas, Quail Map Co, UK (various editions)
- Tunnels in the 1966 Encyclopaedia of New Zealand
