= Auckland railway electrification =

Infrastructure development

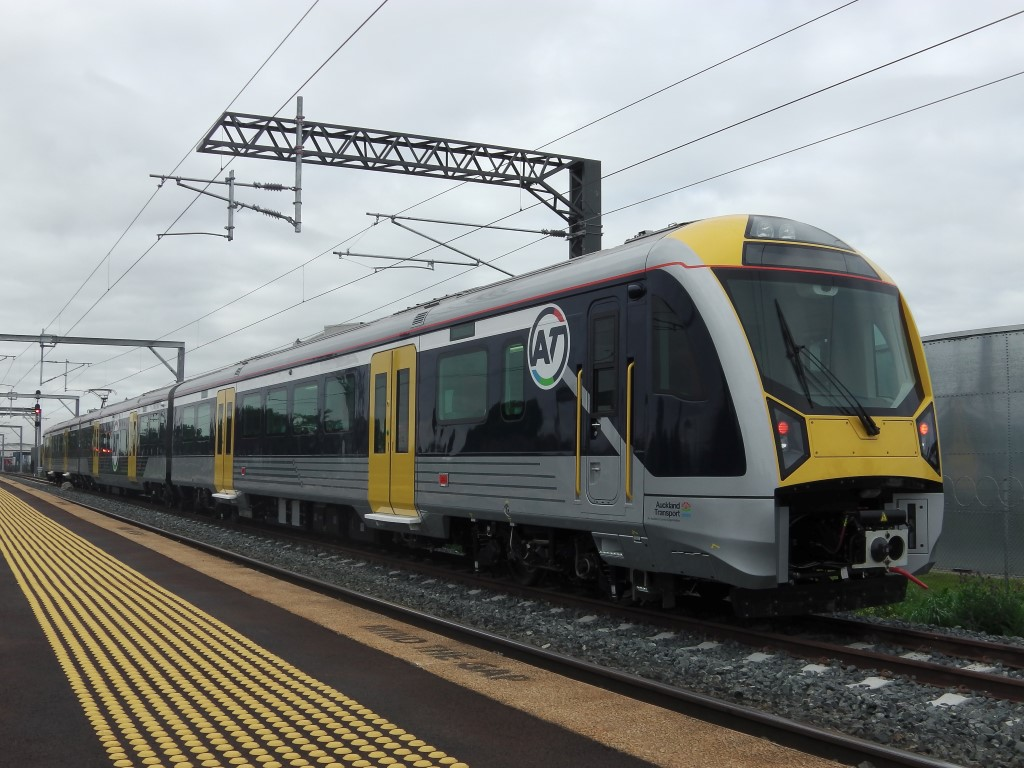
A new AM class electric multiple unit at Puhinui in 2013, introduced as part of railway electrification in Auckland.

Auckland railway electrification occurred in phases as part of investment in a new infrastructure for Auckland's urban railway network. Electrification of the network had been proposed for several decades. Installation started in the late 2000s after funds were approved from a combination of regional (Auckland Regional Council, later Auckland Council) and central government (NZ Transport Agency) budgets. Electric trains began operating on much of the network from 2014-15, while diesel trains continued to serve Pukekohe until the track between Papakura and Pukekohe was electrified in 2025. The track between Swanson and Waitakere was not electrified, resulting in passenger services ending in 2015.

In the 2007 budget, the government announced that Auckland suburban railway lines from Swanson in the west to Papakura in the south and including the Manukau and Onehunga branch lines would be electrified at 25 kV 50 Hz AC. The $80 million contract for the electrification infrastructure was awarded on 14 January 2010 to an Australian and New Zealand consortium (HILOR); Hawkins Infrastructure of Parnell and Laing O'Rourke of Australia. Between Papakura, Newmarket, Britomart and Swanson there were 196 single-track kilometres. The overhead infrastructure design was to be based on Balfour Beatty's 3B English design. The contract for 57 3-car EMUs was awarded on 6 October 2011 to Spanish manufacturer CAF.

The first public electric service was on 28 April 2014 on the Onehunga Line.

Electrification from Papakura to Pukekohe had long been proposed, but in the interim, Auckland Council intended to buy trains equipped with batteries (BEMU) that would have extended electric unit services to Pukekohe. This plan was abandoned following the 2017 general election. The New Zealand Upgrade Programme announced on 30 January 2020 included $371 million for Papakura to Pukekohe electrification. Work began in 2022 and was completed in August 2024. The electrified section from Papakura to Pukekohe became operational on 3 February 2025.

== Specifications ==
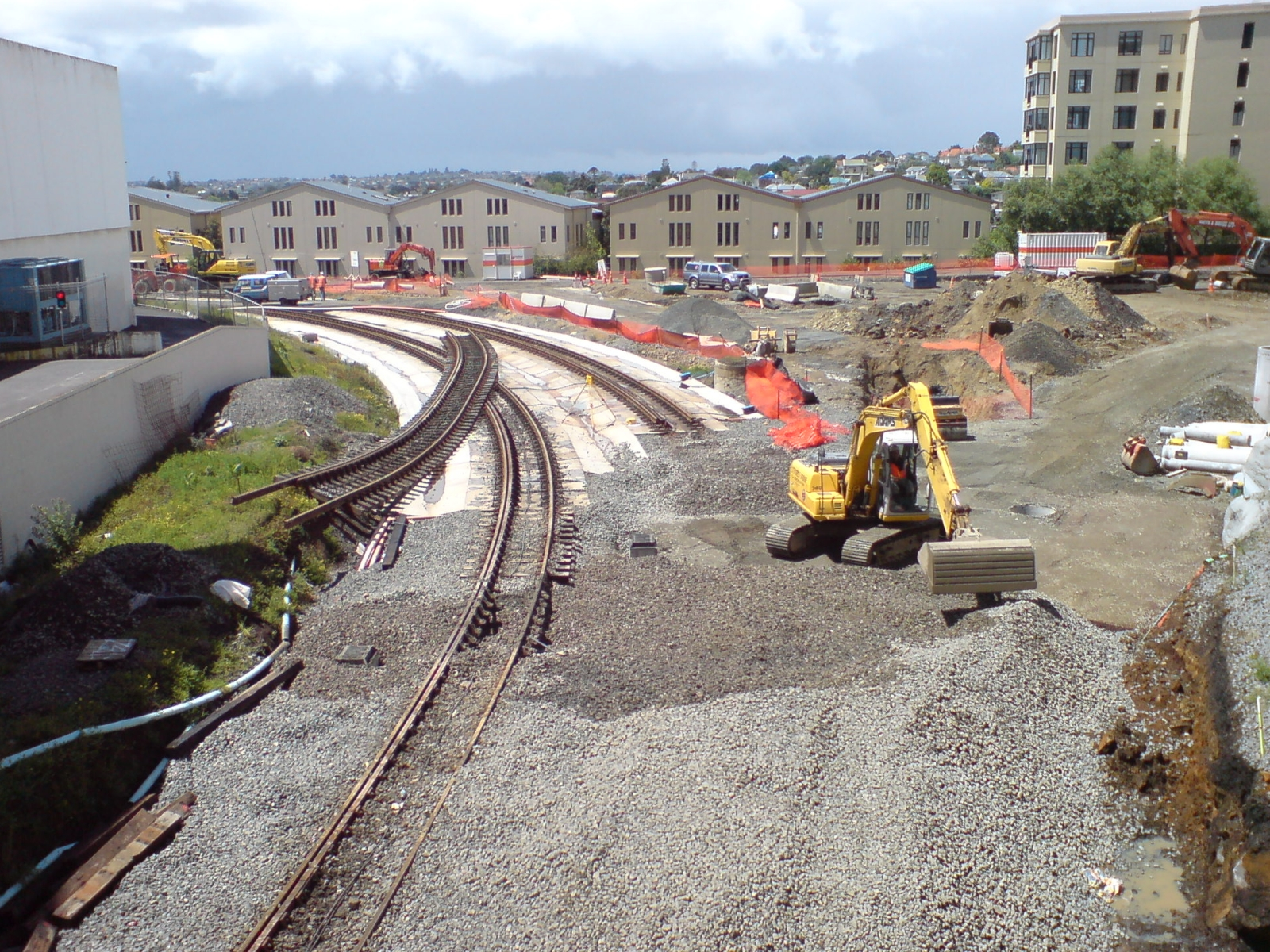
Rail works preceding electrification, such as the triangle north of Newmarket, incorporated provision for electrification, such as base foundations. Bridge works increased clearances for the catenary.

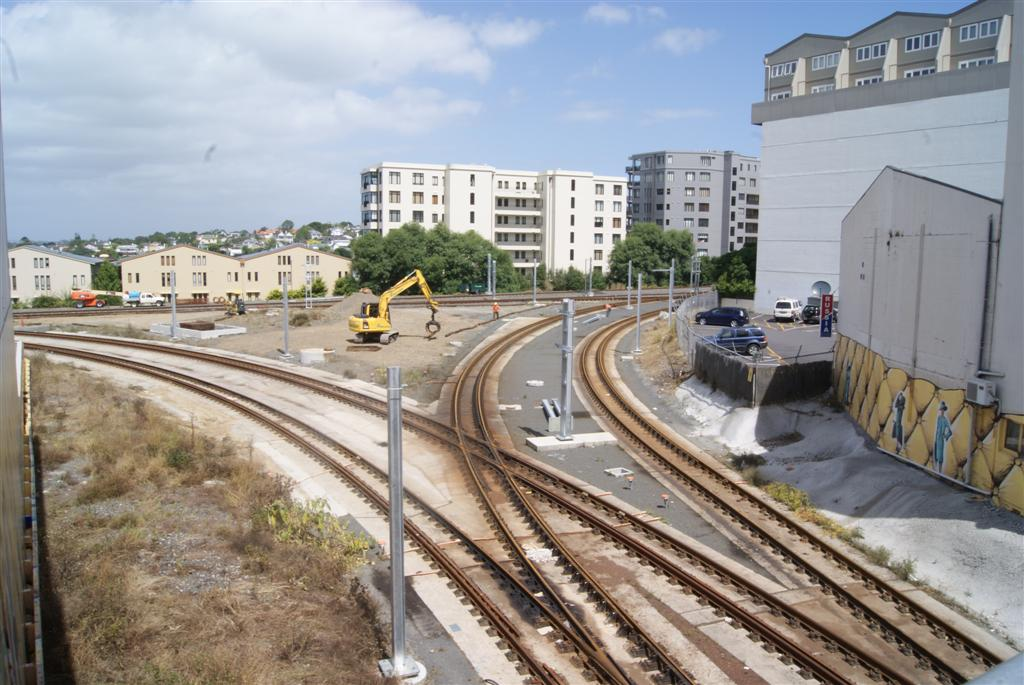
The same junction as above in December 2010, with some of the traction poles in place. Newmarket Station is just around the corner of the building at right, with the tracks to Britomart going to left of picture. The tracks in the foreground are those of the Western Line.

=== Power supply ===
All four suburban lines between Swanson in the west and Papakura in the south are electrified at 25 kV 50 Hz AC, the same voltage as the North Island Main Trunk between Te Rapa and Palmerston North. In contrast, the Wellington suburban network (electrified 1938–55) uses 1,500 V DC.

About 3,500 masts were installed as part of the project. The Onehunga Line was the first line to be commissioned.

The system is supplied by two connections to Transpower's 220 kV national grid, one at the former Southdown Power Station and the other at Transpower's Penrose substation. Both connections are duplicated (Penrose has limited duplication due to having only one 220/25 kV transformer), and one connection can supply the entire network if the other one fails, creating a high level of redundancy. KiwiRail said electrification would use less than 1% of Auckland's electricity capacity.

In conjunction with the electrification to Pukekohe, a third connection for the system is planned, supplied from Transpower's Drury substation.

=== Rolling stock ===
The decision to electrify was partly prompted by the ageing diesel train fleet becoming unreliable. The fleet comprised diesel multiple units (DMUs) bought second-hand from Perth, Australia, and rebuilt British Rail Mark II carriages in push/pull configuration with DC and DFT locomotives; the Auckland Regional Transport Authority established that electric trains would be cheaper to run long term. Around the world, cities with high-frequency metropolitan passenger rail services use electric trains, partly because of their quieter operation, faster travel between stations and greater environmental benefits.

After electrification a small number of diesel trains were retained to provide shuttle services between Papakura and Pukekohe. In May 2012, the possibility of extending electrification to Pukekohe was to be investigated by Auckland Transport.

The EMUs were delivered from 2013, with the last units in 2016. In June 2013, it was confirmed they would be classified AM class (standing for Auckland Metro), with the motor car classified AMA, trailer car AMT, and motor/pantograph car AMP.

In July 2017, Auckland Council's Finance & Performance Committee approved in principle an order from CAF of 17 EMUs equipped with batteries (BEMU) that would extend electric unit services to Pukekohe. The approval was subject to the New Zealand Transport Agency agreeing to fund at least 50% of the cost of the order and the future operation; the new units were expected to start operating in 2019. In November 2017, it was announced that the proposed BEMU order had been cancelled and another 15 AM class units would be ordered. The rationale for this became clear in late April 2018 when electrification between Papakura and Pukekohe was announced as part of the $28 billion Auckland Transport Alignment Project.

=== Other infrastructure ===
==== Crossings, bridges and tunnels ====
There were 31 public level crossings between Swanson and Pukekohe and 8 on the Onehunga Branch. With electrification there is a need to safeguard crossings, since electric trains are quieter and more frequent. This includes bridges or tunnels in some cases, and the closure of small suburban street crossings in others. Height restrictions of 4.25 metres or 5.0 metres were imposed to keep vehicles clear of overhead wires.

The Broadway overbridge in Newmarket and Parnell Tunnel were among the first of about 40 structures that needed modification before electric trains could run. Tracks were lowered in Purewa Tunnel on the Eastern Line.

==== Signalling upgrades ====
The electrification was completed in conjunction with a NZ$90 million upgrade to the signalling system. As the AC return current is through the rails, insulated rail joints had to be removed (or circumvented by joining rails with a bond wire). The old signalling system used track circuits with insulated rail joints; these had to be installed initially for the duplication of the Western Line. The new European Train Control System (ETCS, Mark II) uses train detection by axle counters.

==== Station upgrades ====
The planning of the Parnell station and upgrades to existing stations at Ellerslie (in combination with motorway works), Onehunga (lengthening for 3-car units) and Mount Albert (amenity upgrades), took into consideration the electrification of the network, so that modifications were not needed later.

==== Maintenance depot ====
Funding arrangements for the rolling stock purchase included the construction of a maintenance depot and stabling facilities. After looking at potential sites, 4.4 hectares of the old Winstone Quarry in Wiri (next to the South-Western Expressway, near the closed Wiri Station, and bordered by Roscommon and Wiri Station Roads) was selected, being large enough to house all the facilities required and adjacent to the NIMT railway line.

Significant earthworks to prepare the site commenced in January 2011 and in May 2012 a NZ$40 million contract to construct the facility was awarded to Downer New Zealand Limited. The facility was officially opened on 5 July 2013 and joint operational control was handed over to the train operator Transdev Auckland Limited and train supplier & maintenance operator CAF on 28 August 2013. The cost of the depot including land, construction and facility equipment was approximately NZ$100 million.

The facility includes 6 kilometres of sidings and a 7,650 square metre depot building consisting of office facilities and the main workshop where servicing of the 57 electric trains takes place. The workshop has seven maintenance berths and has overhead gantry cranes and jacking systems for lifting the trains, high-level platforms to access train roofs, under-floor pits and a wheel lathe. There are an automatic train wash and covered platforms to facilitate cleaning of the inside of the trains. The facility has been future proofed to maintain a fleet of up to 109 electric trains.

The ground floor offices house CAF and the first floor Transdev and staff amenities. The Transdev offices include the depot control office and driver training facilities, which include two train simulators. Each simulator is laid out exactly like the driver's cab with a large flat screen display in place of the windscreen that displays the view that the driver would see from the cab. The display is programmed with the Auckland railway network, filmed in 2012 and converted into video graphics. The simulator can be set to simulate daytime or night-time and includes a range of weather conditions, and it can simulate faults in the train and emergency situations.

Train movements within the facility are controlled by Transdev staff from the depot control office.

The stabling capacity is 28 electric trains. There are other stabling yards at Henderson, The Strand Station, and Papakura.

== Funding ==
The Auckland Regional Council envisaged that a regional fuel tax of five cents per litre would be required to pay for the trains, the upgrade of other rolling stock, above-track infrastructure development including stations and maintenance facilities, ferry terminal upgrades and other transport infrastructure including integrated smartcard ticketing, and the council was to fund the Auckland Regional Transport Authority to buy electric trains and to operate services, and to provide stabling and maintenance facilities. The infrastructure was to be paid from national funds.

However, the Fifth National Government cancelled the proposed tax, with the electrification to be paid for by central government. This move was heavily criticised for leaving the electrification in doubt for a time, for delaying parts of the project, such as train tendering, and for putting control of Auckland public transport into Wellington's hands.

In late 2009, the government confirmed that NZ$500 million in loans would be extended to KiwiRail to enable it to proceed with tendering for the rolling stock, a process that the cancellation of the fuel tax had interrupted by at least half a year. The fact that the money was only a loan, with no means provided for Auckland or KiwiRail to raise extra funds to repay it (as was intended to be done with the regional fuel tax), was criticised strongly in Auckland, as it would mean that Auckland would pay for the trains yet not own them.

In mid-2011, after long negotiations between Auckland Council/Auckland Transport and the government, it was announced that the trains would be owned by Auckland, with Auckland paying approximately half of the cost from rates, and paying annual track access charges to KiwiRail and any potential purchase price increases as the winning tenderer is finalised.

The section of the Southern Line between Pukekohe and Papakura, was operated as a shuttle service using ADL/ADC class diesel multiple units until 2022. The Draft future urban land supply strategy states that electrification of the network would be extended southwards to Pukekohe once the special housing area at Paerata is opened up in the "second decade" of the plan, that is by 2030. A petition for the electrification to be undertaken sooner was started by a local resident of Pukekohe, and the matter was discussed by both main parties during campaigning for the 2017 general election. In preparation for future electrification, KiwiRail has been consulting with Transpower about a third power supply for its network from the Drury 220 kV switching station.

In 2020, the government announced $371 million in funding to extend electrification from Papakura to Pukekohe, with the upgrade expected to take two to three years (see also New Zealand Upgrade Programme). There was criticism that KiwiRail was negotiating with two overseas-owned companies (McConnell Dowell, South Africa and John Holland, China) to carry out the contract, which is expected to provide over 200 jobs. Work commenced in 2022 and was completed in August 2024.

== Timeline ==
2007, Electrification announced

- 17 May: As part of the 2007 New Zealand budget it is announced that electrification would proceed, to be completed by 2013.

2008, Regional fuel tax law passed

- 3 July: A law is passed allowing regional fuel taxes to fund large capital projects, of up to 10c a litre but limited to 2c in 2009 and 5c in 2010.

2009, Regional fuel tax cancelled

- Early 2009: Before the regional fuel tax can be implemented, a change in government sees the incoming National government cancel the fuel tax, though electrification is still to be funded.
- November 2009: The government confirms NZ$500 million in loans to KiwiRail to allow the interrupted purchasing process for the electric trains to continue. It is later clarified that Auckland would have to repay the loan, without a mechanism to fund the extra cost. After negotiations between central and local government, this is reduced in severity by government providing over half of the purchase cost as a subsidy, with the rest still to be paid from rates.

2010, Electrification contract awarded

- 14 January: KiwiRail announces that it has awarded the contract for electrification to a consortium (HILOR) of Hawkins Infrastructure, a division of New Zealand company Hawkins Construction, and Laing O'Rourke Australia, for NZ$80 million.

2011, Construction of EMU maintenance and stabling depot begins

- 4.4 hectares of the old Winstone Quarry in Wiri is selected as the site of a maintenance and stabling facility for the new trains. Earthworks preparing the site start in January 2011 and construction of the 7650 sq m building and the six kilometres of sidings in the stabling area commence in May 2012.
- 6 October 2011, CAF is confirmed as the successful tenderer, for approximately NZ$400 million.

2013, Wiri EMU maintenance and stabling depot opened

- 5 July: Auckland Mayor Len Brown officially opens the facility.
- 26 August: The first train (unit number AM 103) is delivered by truck to the depot for certification. The train is officially unveiled during a ceremony at the depot on 12 September.

2014 Scheduled EMU passenger services begin

- 28 April: The first EMU passenger trains enter regular service between Britomart and Onehunga on the Onehunga Line. Three EMUs are used that day with unit AM 129 being the first in service, departing Onehunga at 05:46 followed by AM 116 at 06:10 and AM 103 used as a standby spare.

July 2015, Full electric service

- 20 July: Electric trains begin operating all services between Swanson and Papakura, seven days a week.

August 2024, Electrification extended to Pukekohe

- 13 August: Electrification was extended to Pukekohe. Passenger services began on 3 February 2025.

== Stages of completion ==
KiwiRail announced the works would be implemented in five phases:

Stage 1

- Southern line, Otahuhu-Britomart
- Western line, Newmarket-Morningside
- Onehunga Branch.

Stage 2

- Western Line, Morningside-Swanson

Stage 3

- Southern Line, Otahuhu-Puhinui
- Manukau Branch.

Stage 4

- Southern Line, Puhinui-Papakura.

Stage 5

- Eastern line, Westfield–Quay Park Junction (near Britomart)

=== Progress ===
During the summer 2011–2012 shutdown, the approaches to Britomart were rebuilt to allow for electrification, masts installed and holes bored, and wiring completed in some areas. During the 2013–2014 shut-down, the complex job of wiring Quay Park Junction, The Strand stabling facility and Britomart was completed. By January 2014 wires had been installed:

- Western Line: Swanson-Mount Albert, Newmarket-Britomart;
- Southern Line: Britomart-Papakura;
- Eastern Line: Britomart-Purewa Tunnel south end;
- Manukau Branch;
- Onehunga Branch.

Services were planned to start during April 2014 and the first scheduled electric train service (from Britomart to Onehunga) took place on 28 April 2014.

The project was completed on 20 July 2015 with full electric train service across the network.

== Future expansion ==
The City Rail Link, which opened in 2026, was electrified from the time of its opening, and it is likely that any future expansions of the rail network within Auckland would be electrified from the outset.

=== Western Line ===
The section of the Western Line between Swanson and Waitakere was not electrified. There was also talk of potentially electrifying the Western Line up to the fast growing areas of Kumeu (the location of the old Kumeu–Riverhead Section) and Huapai — up to the Helensville railway station. Electrification was not carried out due to the low roof height of the Waitakere Tunnel and because enlarging it was considered to be an unjustified expense considering the low passenger numbers to Waitakere Station. Rail services to Waitakere were withdrawn when electric services commenced on the rest of the Western Line. Waitakere Village is now served by bus services connecting to Swanson and Henderson.

=== Avondale to Southdown Line ===
A new line between Avondale and Southdown is currently planned as part of Kiwirail's 30-year strategic plan and has government backing.

=== Buckland, Tuakau & Pokeno ===
There have also been regular discussions of extending electrification of the Southern Line from Pukekohe to Buckland, Tuakau, and Pokeno, all of which formerly had railway stations. The Waikato District Council has also pushed for electrification and rail stations at Tuakau and Pokeno, to eventually electrify to Hamilton.

== See also ==
- Railway electrification in New Zealand
- Public transport in Auckland
- Transport in Auckland
- Britomart Transport Centre
- List of Auckland railway stations
