= 2007 New Zealand budget =

- Submitted by: Michael Cullen
- Country: New Zealand
- Parliament: Parliament of New Zealand
- Party: Labour
- Total revenue: ▲$59.4
- Total expenditures: ▲$56.1 billion
- Surplus: ▲$6.4 billion
- Debt: ▲$4.7 billion (Net) ▲2.7% (Net debt to GDP)
- Website: http://www.treasury.govt.nz/budget/2007
- ^{ǂ}Numbers in italics are projections.

The New Zealand budget for fiscal year 2007-2008 was presented to the New Zealand House of Representatives by Finance Minister Dr Michael Cullen on 17 May 2007.

This was the eighth budget Michael Cullen presented as Minister of Finance.

== Outline ==
=== Tax changes ===
Budget 2007 made a number of changes to the tax system:

- reduced the Company Tax rate from 33% to 30%.
- introduced a 15% research and development tax credit.

=== KiwiSaver ===
Budget 2007 made a number of changes to the KiwiSaver scheme:

- Member contributions to KiwiSaver were matched by a tax credit, to a maximum of $20 per week (a total of $1,040 per year);
- Increases to employers contributions to employees KiwiSaver accounts.

=== Infrastructure ===
Budget 2007 announced funding for the Auckland railway electrification project.
