= Newmarket Line =

Railway line in Auckland, New Zealand

Overview
- Status: Operational
- Owner: KiwiRail
- Locale: Auckland, New Zealand
- Termini: Newmarket Junction; Quay Park Junction
- Connecting lines: North Auckland Line; North Island Main Trunk
- Stations: Newmarket; Parnell

Service
- Services: Te Huia; Northern Explorer; South City Line

History
- Opened: 24 December 1873

Technical
- Line length: 2.53 km (1.57 mi)
- Number of tracks: 2
- Character: grade-separated
- Track gauge: 1,067 mm (3 ft 6 in)
- Electrification: 25 kV 50 Hz AC overhead
- Train protection system: ETCS L1

The Newmarket Line is a railway line in Auckland, New Zealand, that runs between Newmarket and Quay Park Junction via Parnell. It is 2.5 km long. It connects the North Auckland Line (NAL), which runs between Westfield Junction and Otiria via Newmarket, and the North Island Main Trunk (NIMT), which runs from Wellington to Maungawhau via Quay Park Junction.

The railway line is utilised by frequent all-stations South City Line services, operated by Auckland Transport. Additionally, KiwiRail operates regional Te Huia and intercity Northern Explorer services over the line from Auckland Strand, but these do not stop.

The line has had the name Newmarket Line since 2011. From 1996 to 2011, it was named the Auckland–Newmarket Line, as it ran to the old Auckland railway station until that station closed in July 2003. Between 1977 and 1996, it was named the Newmarket Branch Railway.

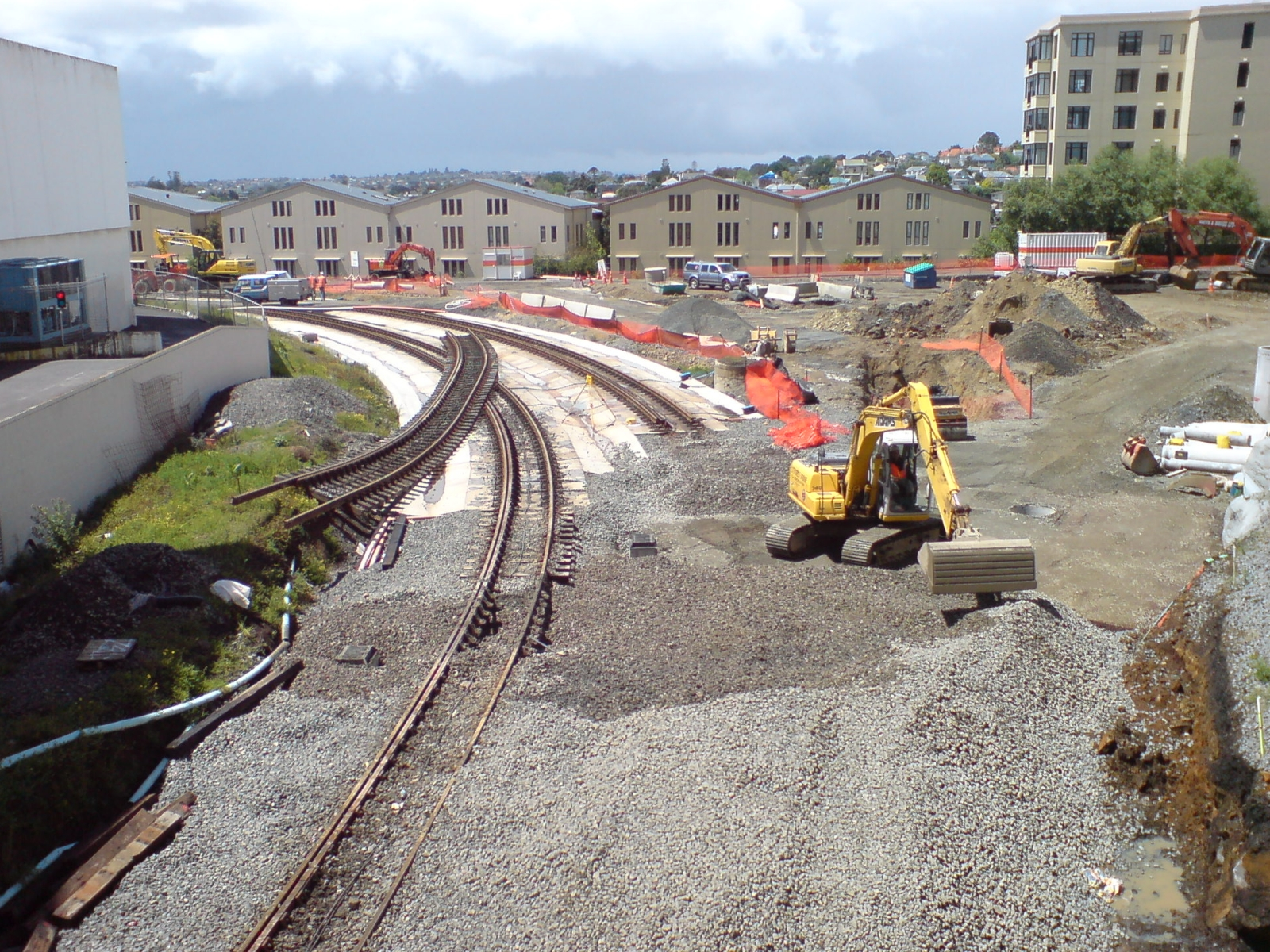
Rail works of recent years, such as the triangle north of Newmarket, have incorporated provision for electrification, such as base foundations. Recent bridge works have increased clearances for the catenary.

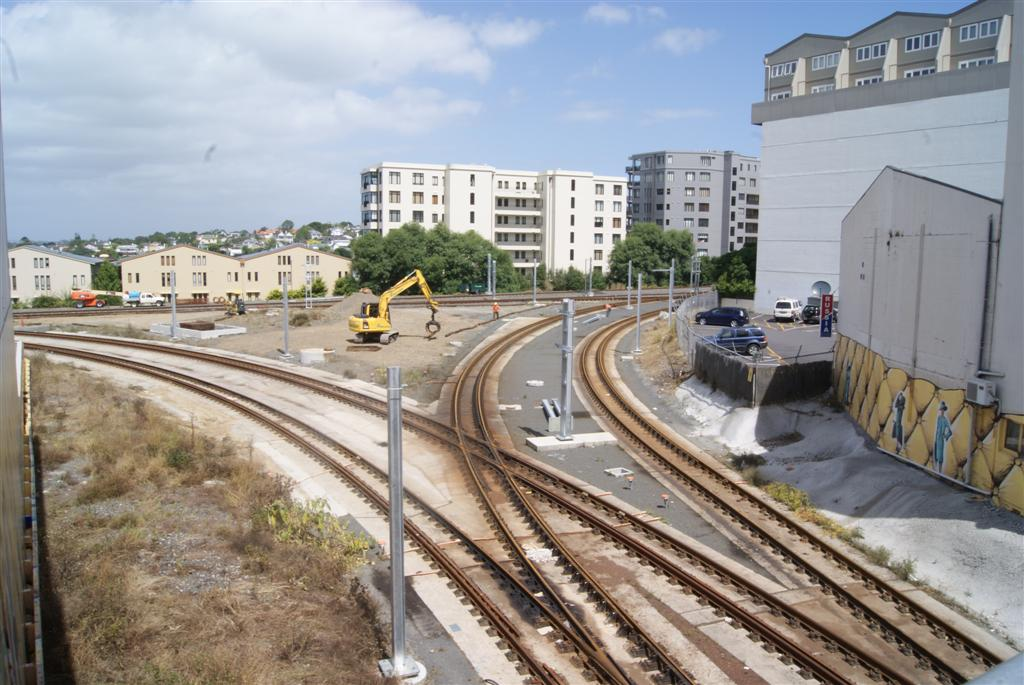
The same junction as above in December 2010, with some of the traction poles in place, although as yet unfinished.

The Newmarket Line was originally opened to regular passenger trains on 24 December 1873 as the northern portion of Auckland's first railway to Onehunga via Penrose. It was part of the North Island Main Trunk until the Westfield Deviation opened in 1930.

Since 1915, it has been fully double tracked after an upgrade of Parnell Tunnel north of Newmarket. Previous to that, it led as a single track section through a previous Parnell Tunnel.

In 2007, the major junction that connects the Newmarket Line with the North Auckland Line was rebuilt into a 'wye junction', removing the time-consuming reversing backshunt needed to access the NAL to the north from the Newmarket Line, thus giving the line better access to Britomart Station. This was part of a big upgrade of rail infrastructure in Auckland, and the Newmarket Station and Junction was included in the stage one electrification of the network.

A new station, Parnell, began operation on the line at the suburb of the same name on 12 March 2017, with an official opening on 13 March. It is the only intermediate station on the line, with train services running north to Waitematā or south to Newmarket.

== See also ==
- North Island Main Trunk Line
- North Auckland Line
- Manukau Branch
- Onehunga Branch
- Riverhead Branch
- Waiuku/Mission Bush Branch
