= Parnell railway station =

Train station in Auckland, New Zealand

Parnell
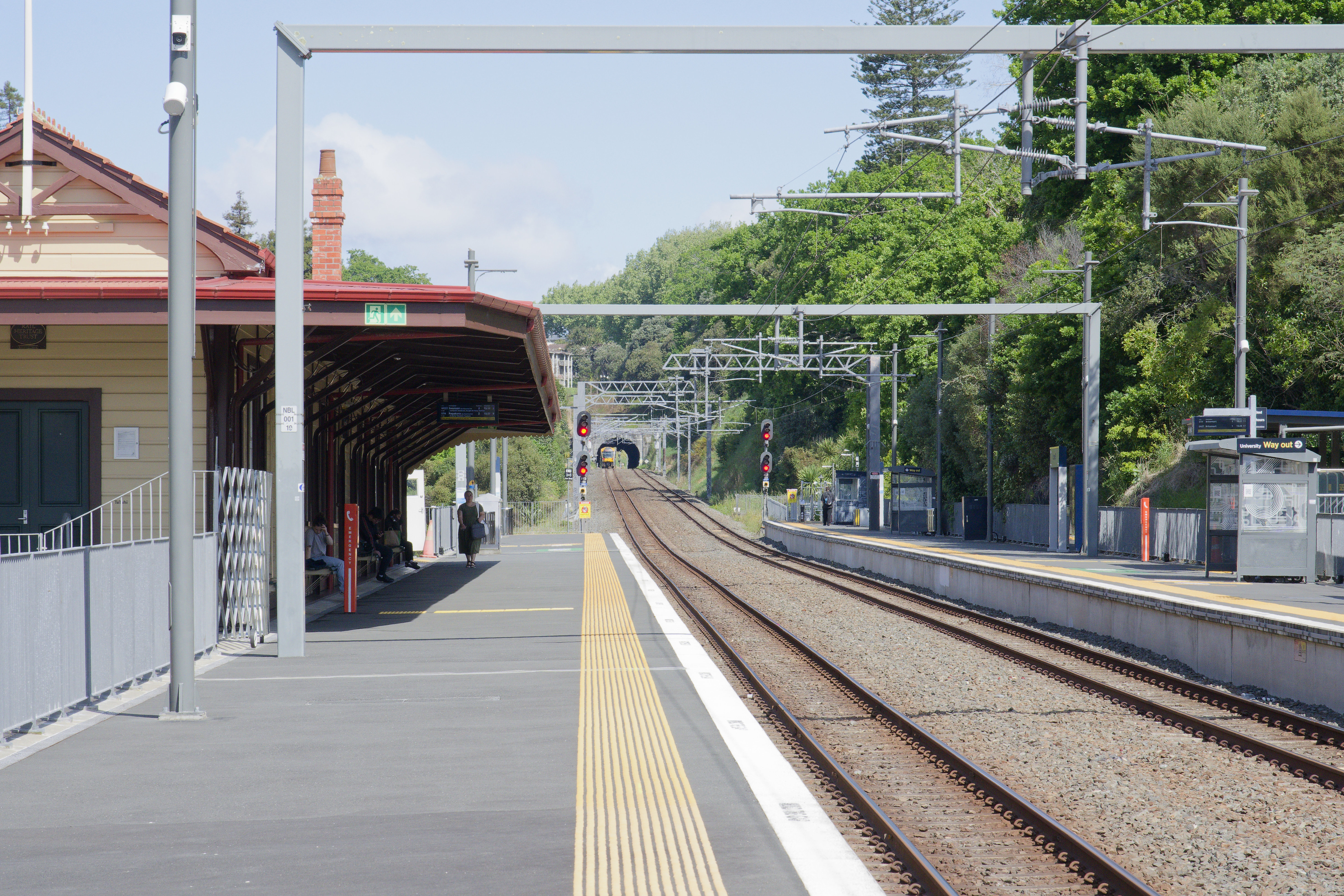
- Looking towards Parnell tunnel from the Down Main line platform, 2023

General information
- Location: Parnell, Auckland; New Zealand
- Coordinates: 36°51′19″S 174°46′40″E
- System: Auckland Transport Urban rail
- Owner: KiwiRail (track and platforms); Auckland Transport (buildings)
- Operator: Auckland One Rail
- Line: Newmarket Line
- Distance: 2.10 km (1.30 mi) from Newmarket
- Platforms: Side platforms (P1 & P2)
- Tracks: Mainline (2)

Construction
- Parking: No
- Cycle facilities: No
- Accessible: Yes

Other information
- Station code: AKD
- Fare zone: City

History
- Opened: 12 March 2017
- Electrified: April 2014

Passengers
- 2017: 2,900/week

Services
Preceding station	Auckland Transport (Auckland One Rail)	Following station
Waitematā towards Pukekohe	South City Line	Newmarket Terminus
Former services
Preceding station	Auckland Transport (Auckland One Rail)	Following station
Waitematā Terminus	Southern Line pre-2026	Newmarket towards Pukekohe
Waitematā Terminus	Western Line pre-2026	Newmarket towards Swanson
Location

Parnell railway station is a station serving the inner-city suburb of Parnell in Auckland, New Zealand. It is situated on the Newmarket Line, approximately 600m north of Parnell Tunnel, and is located in the Waipapa Valley adjacent to Auckland Domain. It is served by the South City line.

The station provides access to Auckland Domain, Parnell Town Centre, and the University of Auckland.

== History ==
The line through the area opened on 24 December 1873. A request was made for trains to stop at Parnell, but in 1878 the Public Works Department claimed there was too little traffic

In August 1909 duplication of the railway from Auckland to the Parnell Signal Box was completed. Following the completion of a new double track tunnel alongside the old Parnell Tunnel in March 1915, the second track had been extended to Newmarket by June 1915.

The Parnell Diesel Depot was built in 1955, for inspection and repair of all diesel locomotives in the northern district as well as railcars. Later it was used by the Mainline Steam Heritage Trust.

=== Planning and construction ===
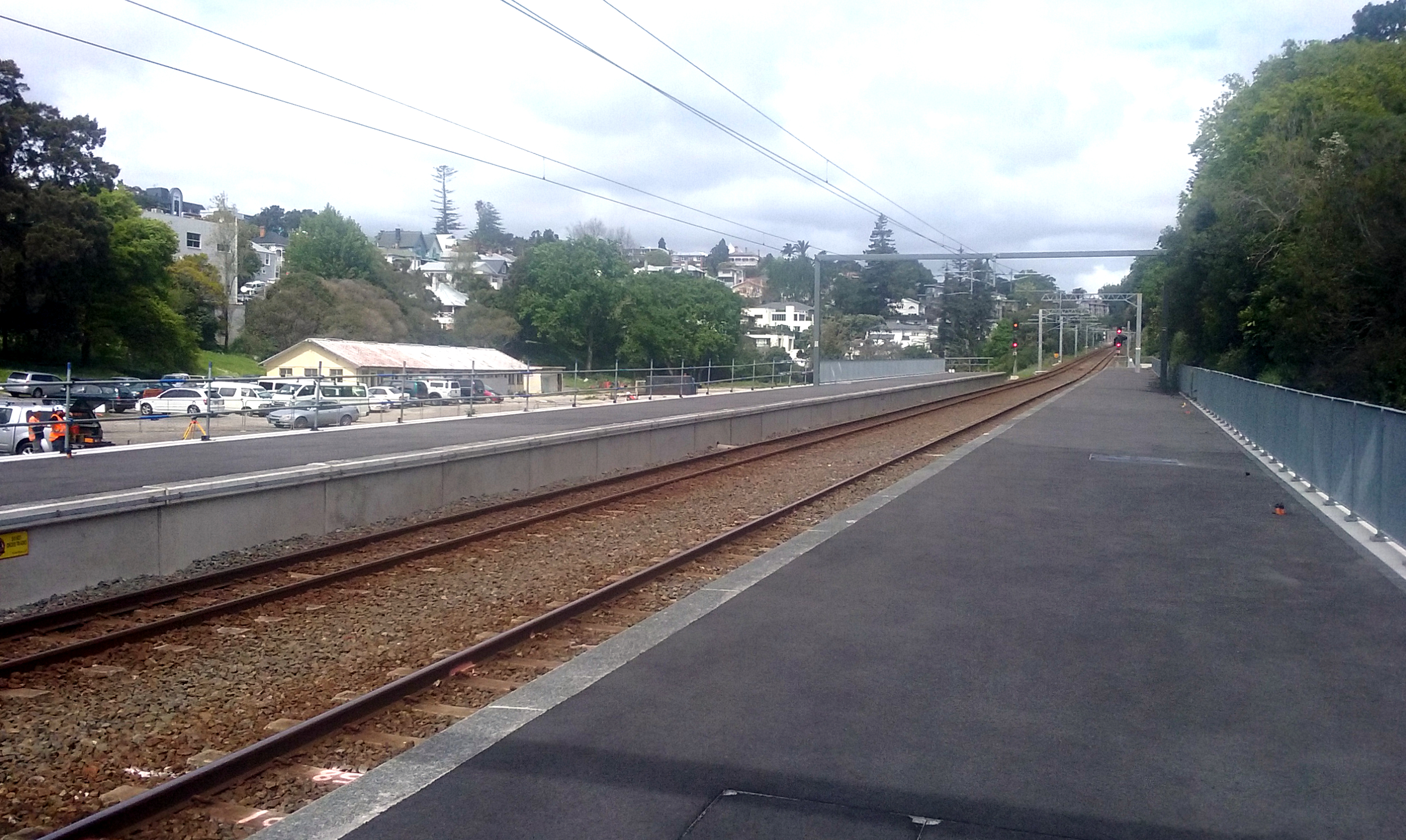
The station under construction, November 2016.

After a plan to lease part of the area as a bus depot was cancelled, KiwiRail and Auckland Council were asked in 2010 by the outgoing Auckland Regional Council (ARC) to make an early start on construction of the proposed station, which was to cost $13 million or more, to ensure that there would not need to be costly extra work after the electrification of the line as part of the Auckland railway electrification. It was proposed that several million dollars saved during the upgrade of the Newmarket station be allocated to this new station.

Three station locations were proposed by ARC staff - including at the Parnell Bridge Overpass, Carlaw Park, and Cheshire Street.

Lobbying by the Parnell Business Association, local residents, and councillor Mike Lee saw the Cheshire Street location chosen for the station. The new location was suggested in order to serve as a "niche station for visitors to the heritage Parnell precinct and the Auckland War Memorial Museum." The location of the station has been criticised for its poor accessibility and perceived weaker outcomes.

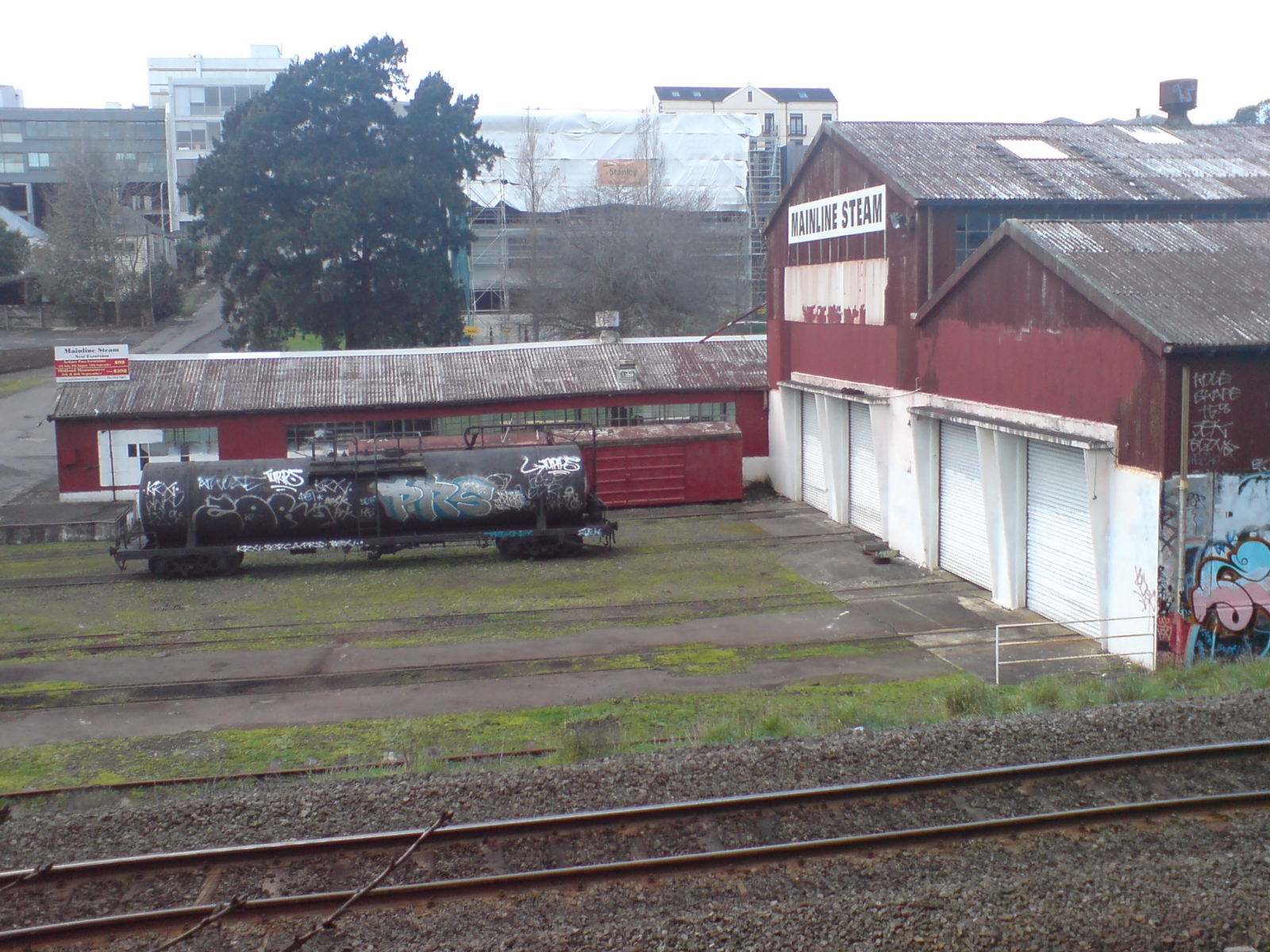
The former depot, 2009

The early proposal would also integrate the new station with some of the historic railway workshop sheds of the adjacent Mainline Steam depot but nothing eventuated. The Mainline Steam Heritage Trust had its lease on the depot terminated by KiwiRail and completed its move from the site in June 2015. The sheds were demolished in September 2015.

The heritage station building, designed by George Troup, was built in 1908 to serve Newmarket Junction. It was removed from Newmarket during a 2008–2010 upgrade, then relocated onto the Parnell station Down Main platform in 2016–2017. As of early 2019, the station building is used to house artist studios and a gallery.

=== Opening ===
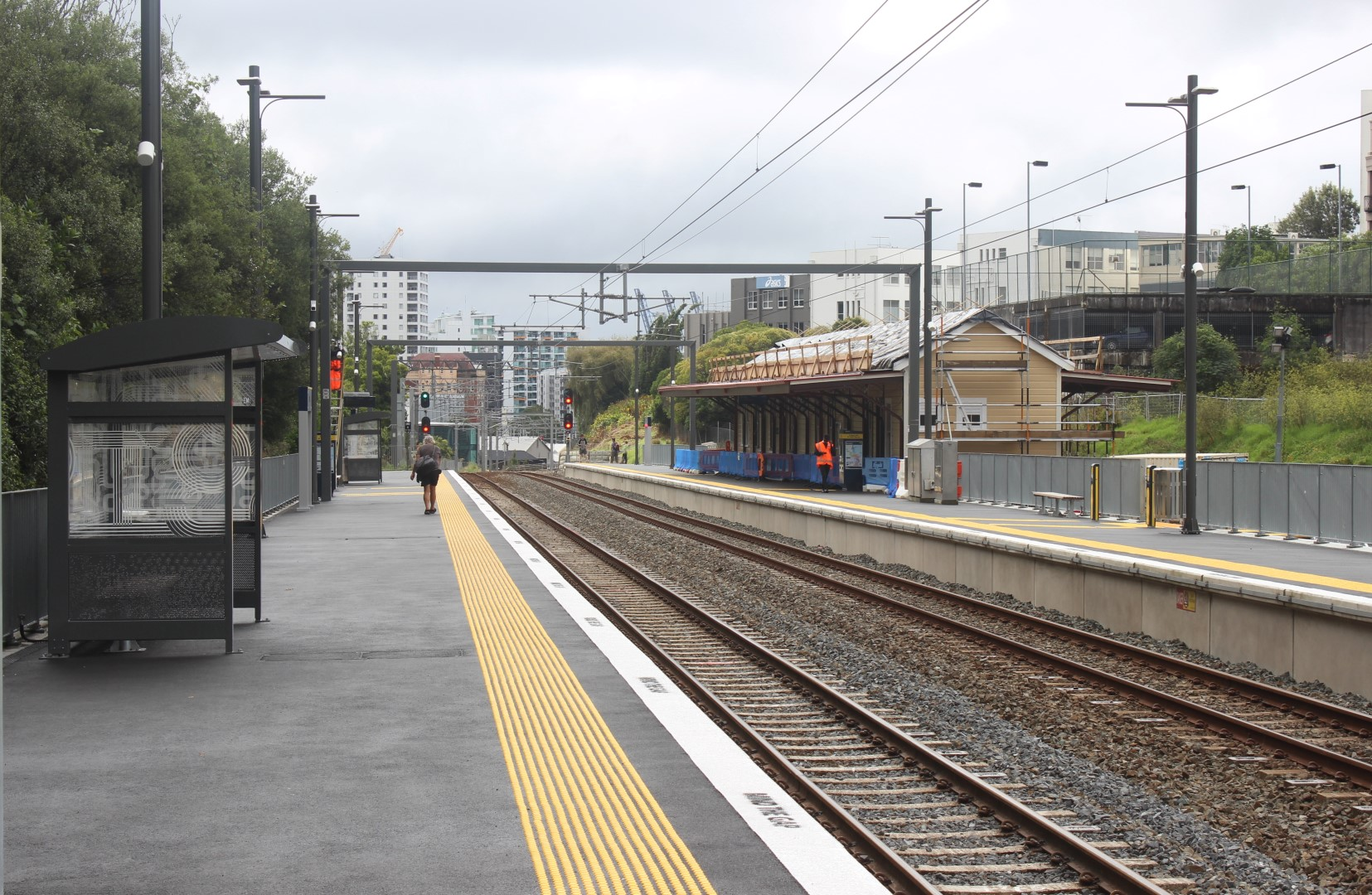
Parnell railway station, March 2017. The relocated Newmarket station building is undergoing refurbishment.

In late 2015, Auckland Transport advised that opening the Parnell station to passenger services was being postponed until the completion of a road bridge at Cowie Street, replacing the nearby level crossing on Sarawia Street. AT received approval from independent planning commissioners in June 2016. The following November, the commissioners' recommendation for the bridge was appealed. If AT had been unable to address the concerns expressed in the appeal, an Environment Court hearing (most likely in early 2017) would have decided whether the appeal would be upheld.

The station opened on 12 March 2017 with relatively basic facilities and initially serving a limited number of lines. The official opening by Mayor of Auckland, Phil Goff, and Waitematā Local Board chair Pippa Coom was on 13 March 2017.

In July–August 2018, the Cowie Street bridge to Laxon Terrace was completed and opened and the Sarawia Street level crossing was closed to road traffic. As a result, a new timetable introduced on 26 August 2018 allowed Parnell to become a stop on all Southern Line and Western Line services.

== Station layout ==
The station is located next to the Auckland Domain, where the Auckland War Memorial Museum is situated 1.2 kilometres away. The two side platforms are linked by an underpass. Voice announcements onboard train services warn passengers with mobility needs to avoid using Parnell station due to its steep inclines.

A walkway was established in November 2018 connecting the Parnell Station to the University of Auckland's Carlaw Park Student Village and the Carlaw business centre. A second pedestrian underpass opened on 23 January 2024 at the northern end of the station, to provide step-free access to both platforms and a more direct way to cross the tracks.

== Diesel depot ==
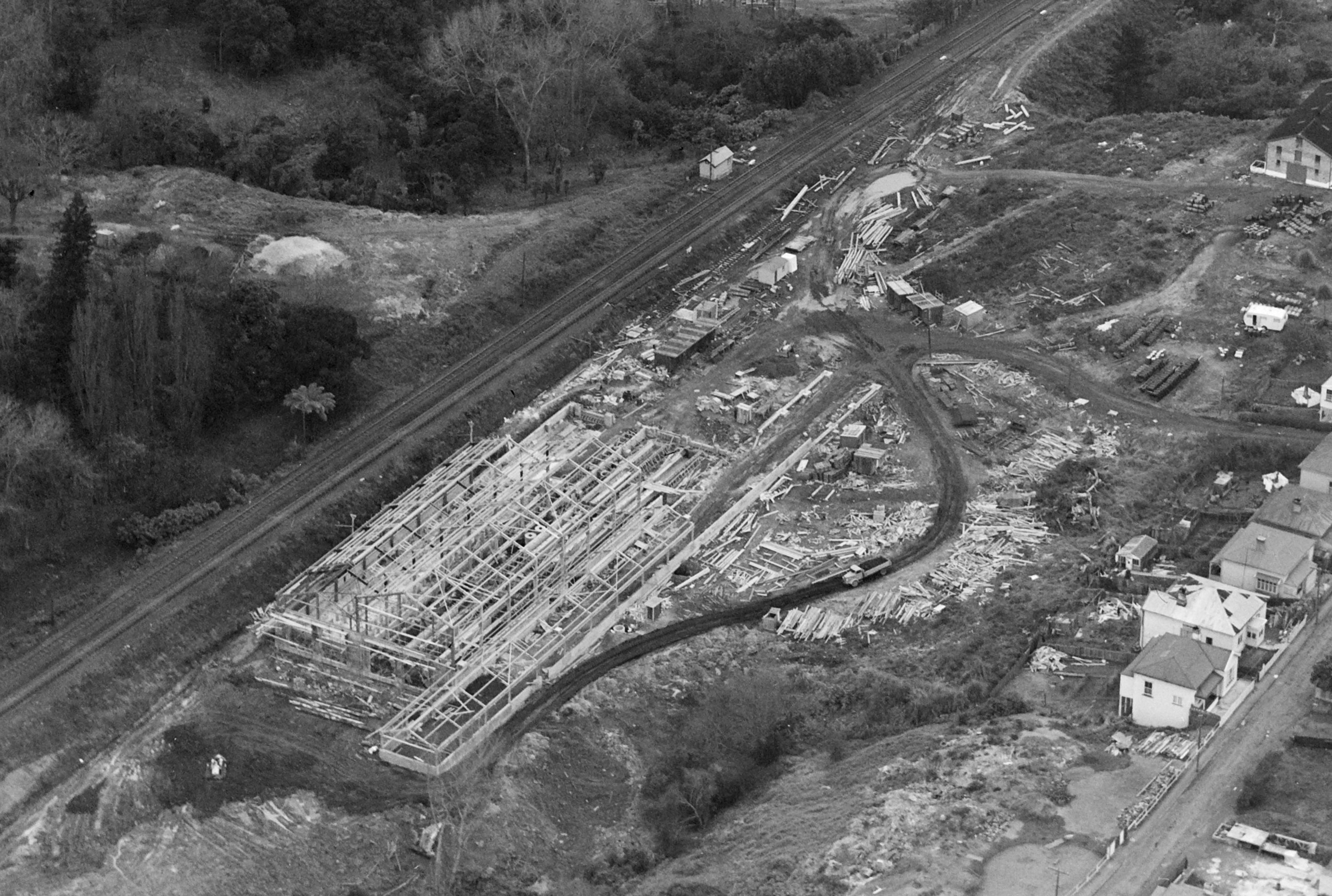
Parnell diesel depot under construction, 1955

On 20 August 1953 a plan was put to Cabinet for a 160 ft x 80 ft diesel depot, with staff amenity building, 2 overhead cranes, wheel lathe, workshop and store. After construction started, the length of the depot was extended by 60 ft, to accommodate 30 large diesel-electric locomotives which were ordered from North America.

Soon after opening it was providing regular facilities for 56 diesel locomotives and 6 railcars. In addition some of the locomotives from Frankton and Taumarunui districts were also dealt with as required. 45 men were employed, with provision for up to 80.

The depot was still doing maintenance work in 1968, but by July 1991 it was used by a preservation group. It became the Mainline Steam Heritage Trust's Auckland depot. The depot finally closed in 2015, and the buildings were later demolished.

== Services ==
Auckland One Rail, on behalf of Auckland Transport, operates South City line services to Newmarket and Pukekohe.

The InnerLink and the OuterLink bus routes pass close to Parnell station.

== See also ==
- List of Auckland railway stations
