= Parnell Tunnel =

Railway Tunnel in Auckland, New Zealand

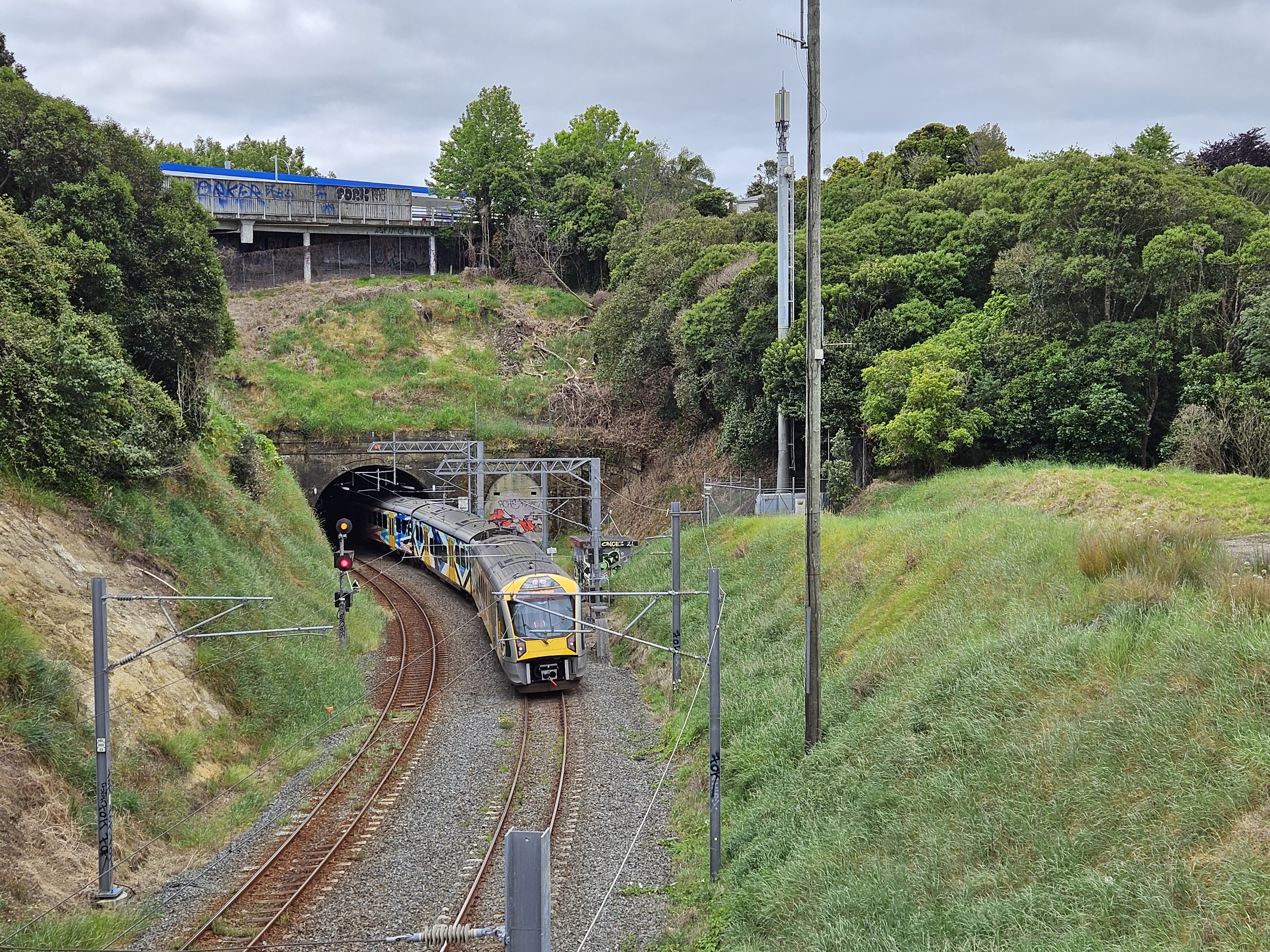
- The southern portals of the newer double-track tunnel, and of the closed older single-track tunnel in 2023
- Interactive map of Parnell Tunnel

Overview
- Line: Newmarket Line
- Location: Parnell, Auckland, New Zealand
- Coordinates: 36.862°S 174.7815°E
- Status: in use
- Start: Parnell
- End: Newmarket

Operation
- Work began: 1864 (original tunnel); 1914 (second tunnel)
- Opened: February 1873 (original tunnel); 1915 (second tunnel)
- Closed: after 1930 (original tunnel)

Technical
- Length: 344.5 m (1,130 ft)
- No. of tracks: 2
- Track gauge: 1,067 mm (3 ft 6 in)

The Parnell Tunnel is a railway tunnel under Parnell, Auckland, New Zealand. It is 344.5 metres (1,130 ft) long, and is on the Newmarket Line.

The tunnel allows the South City Line coming from Newmarket Train Station to Waitematā to pass under the Parnell Ridge before dropping to harbour level.

There are two Parnell Tunnels, an older now unused single-track tunnel and a newer double-track tunnel which superseded it. The older tunnel was closed off and has not been in use for most of the last century.

The older tunnel, originally intended in part to provide a connection to Drury for the New Zealand Wars, has been lauded as having enabled the first public railway line in Auckland, and opening the city up to the wider New Zealand.

== First tunnel ==
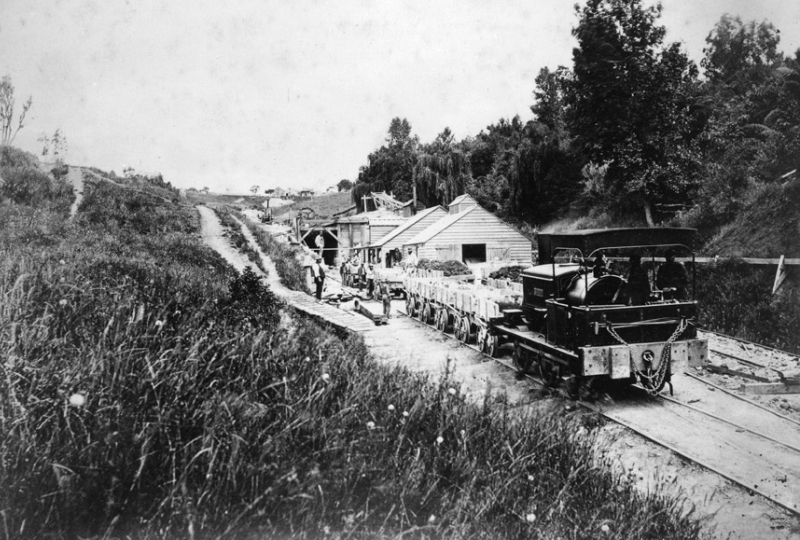
The first tunnel being built in the early 1870s, seen from the northern portal.

The first tunnel shaft was constructed as part of the initial construction of the line. However, works took a very long time – 9 years – having started in 1864. This was partly due to funding issues, but also due to a massive land slip which occurred at the northern end, with investigation of the causes and removal of the slip holding up the works for a long time. After the tunnel was pierced through in June 1872, work speeded up and it was finished in February 1873.

The first tunnel and its approach were relatively steep, often requiring double engines to pull the trains and there are records of the "inconvenient habit" of some "well-loaded" passenger trains coming to a standstill on the gradient in the tunnel. The tunnel was also apparently known for forcing large amounts of steam locomotive fumes into the passenger coaches. During events like Cup Day at Ellerslie Racecourse, when extra trains needed to be provided for the large numbers of travellers (with the trains often composed of open cattle trucks) the sparks thrown by the locomotives tended to rebound into open carriages, often causing burn holes in passengers' clothing. The newspapers of the time often commented on this in sarcastic form.

Due to these drawbacks, after construction of the second tunnel, the old tunnel was quickly demoted to only serve for shunting and non-passenger traffic and was eventually closed fully (sometime after 1930). In World War II, it was temporarily converted into an air-raid shelter for Parnell residents, with baffle gates across the entries to protect against blasts.

There is a proposal to re-open this old tunnel to pedestrians and cyclists, as part of cycleway projects in the area.

== Second tunnel ==
=== Campaign ===
In the 1900s it became increasingly clear that the single-track tunnel, despite having a double-track line at the northern end, was creating significant 'delay, discomfort and danger'. When in 1905 the government declared that the line on the southern side would be duplicated to Penrose, many Aucklanders reacted angrily when it was later clarified that this would not include a tunnel duplication.

The Minister of Railways, Joseph Ward, argued that his staff had convinced him that it was not [yet] essential to duplicate the tunnel to remediate the delays. However, in a strange twist, he moved at the end of a meeting with a 200-strong citizens deputation that if "ten representative [business]men", selected by the Mayor of Auckland, would traverse the section with him, and then ask for the tunnel duplication, he would be willing to proceed with it. At the time, it seems that Aucklanders agreed that, with the duplication from Newmarket to Penrose Train Station still pending, duplication of the tunnel via this scheme would not be seemly.

In 1910, with Ward having become New Zealand's 17th Prime Minister – and with the Newmarket-Penrose side of the tunnel now also duplicated – Clr Mackay of Auckland City Council resurrected the old pledge made by Ward. Newspapers of the time noted that while the duplication was certainly necessary, it remained unseemly to bring about the second tunnel in this way, with a "stacked" body of men asking for it, despite the definite way in which Ward had phrased his pledge – leaving him no honourable alternative to now decline it.

The 10-man committee was indeed formed in 1910, and apparently investigated in detail, in the face of continuing government resistance. In the end, in 1911, only 7 of them recommended duplication, with 3 opposed. The opposition was possibly caused by the concern that the tunnel duplication would prevent a goods shed expansion, and because it had been advised that timetabling could work around the limitations of the single-track tunnel. Government had previously argued that up to 240 trains daily (one every 6 minutes) could be run through the single-track tunnel, and thus, the cost of £35,000-£40,000 for the duplication was not merited when other projects were of greater importance. Due to the lack of unanimous agreement – and because the Railways Department argued the tunnel could take twice the traffic using it at the time – duplication was again declined.

However, there was considerable discontent in Auckland during the 1900s and 1910s that the government was proceeding with major tunneling works in the South Island, such as at the Otira Tunnel to Arthur's Pass, while arguing that there was no funding available for the Parnell Tunnel. Groups like the Auckland Chamber of Commerce lobbied strenuously for the duplication.

At the same time, proposals to either take a new line up Grafton Gully, or build a new line via Ōrākei (which was eventually constructed as the Eastern Line), thus avoiding the almost 1:50 gradient up to the Parnell Tunnel, may have contributed to doubts as to whether the tunnel should be duplicated. There was also a perception by the minister of the day that additional freight traffic generated by the North Auckland Line would not be worth considering as an argument for the tunnel, as it would be extremely limited.

While duplication was finally noted as 'definitely agreed' in 1912, funding was not immediately found. However, the impending move of the engine sheds for the railway from Auckland Railway Station to the Newmarket Workshops also increased pressure to ensure the duplication.

=== Construction ===
A new tunnel, able to carry a double set of tracks, was finally built over the 1914–1915 period. The first preparatory works occurred around April 1914, widening the approaches to the tunnel, and the first air shaft connecting the two drives was pierced through in January 1915. From initially 50 people, the workforce had by then expanded to 140.

Approximately 25,000 cubic yards of earth were removed for the tunnel, for a shaft 25feet 9 inch wide, and 18feet 2 inch high. The walls were constructed in concrete, and almost three quarters of a million bricks were used for the arch, in 4-6 layers. The second tunnel was also constructed to a less challenging gradient than the first.

The tunnel was immediately lauded for the improvements to rail efficiency and safety, now allowing double tracks over the whole line between Britomart and Penrose. By 1926, about 150 trains were passing through the tunnel each day.

=== Upgrades ===
In January 2010, the tracks within the Parnell Tunnel were removed during a summer network closure, and the tunnel floor lowered by between 20 and 35 cm, to prepare the tunnel for the coming electrification of the Auckland rail network. Stormwater drainage was also improved as part of the work, with the insufficient quality of the drains (and the earlier attempts to fix them) having forced authorities to place speed restrictions on the tunnel in the past.

== Incidents ==
During its long history, the tunnel and the immediate area saw a number of significant incidents, including a number of deaths. The tunnel and the steep slow-speed slope leading up to the tunnel from the north, surrounded by thick vegetation, was also known for prisoners escaping from trains on which they were being transported.

In 1907, a young bank teller apparently lost his footing while crossing from one carriage to another, and was later found dead in the tunnel.

In 1915, a railway worker was killed when accidentally stepping onto the track near the tunnel portal.

In 1920, a woman fell from a train carriage near the tunnel entry, and was run over by the train, dying eight days later.

In 1921, a prisoner escaped through a lavatory window while the train was making its way up the hill near the northern portal of the tunnel, and made his getaway successfully. He was recaptured three weeks later.

In 1926, another prisoner escaped in the same general location from a train on which he was being brought to stand trial in Rotorua. The prisoner had been allowed to enter a lavatory without handcuffs once the train had entered the tunnel, and attacked his guard with a kick, allowing him to lock the lavatory door and subsequently smash open the window. A police search party was organised which eventually entered the tunnel to check whether the fugitive had taken refuge there. A train entered the tunnel from the CBD side while the search party was in the tunnel, and though the policemen quickly moved onto the opposing track, the concurrent appearance of a speedy train from the Newmarket side forced them to take whatever shelter they could on the floor of the tunnel or pressed against the tunnel sides. During the passage of the train, one of the policemen, Constable Begg, was struck, receiving arm, leg and head injuries from some part of the undercarriage of the train, and died subsequently in hospital.

Later in 1926, a railway worker was killed within the tunnel, again having been struck by a train and sustained leg and head injuries. He died from them the next day. His death was ruled an accident, as he should not have entered the tunnel until the smoke (of a previous train) had cleared.

In 1929, a naval prisoner being escorted on a train made an escape through a window while the train taking him to Wellington made its slow way up the incline leading to the tunnel on the northern side, a case very similar to the 1921 and 1926 escapes.
