= Eastern Line (Auckland) =

Railway service in Auckland, New Zealand

- EAST
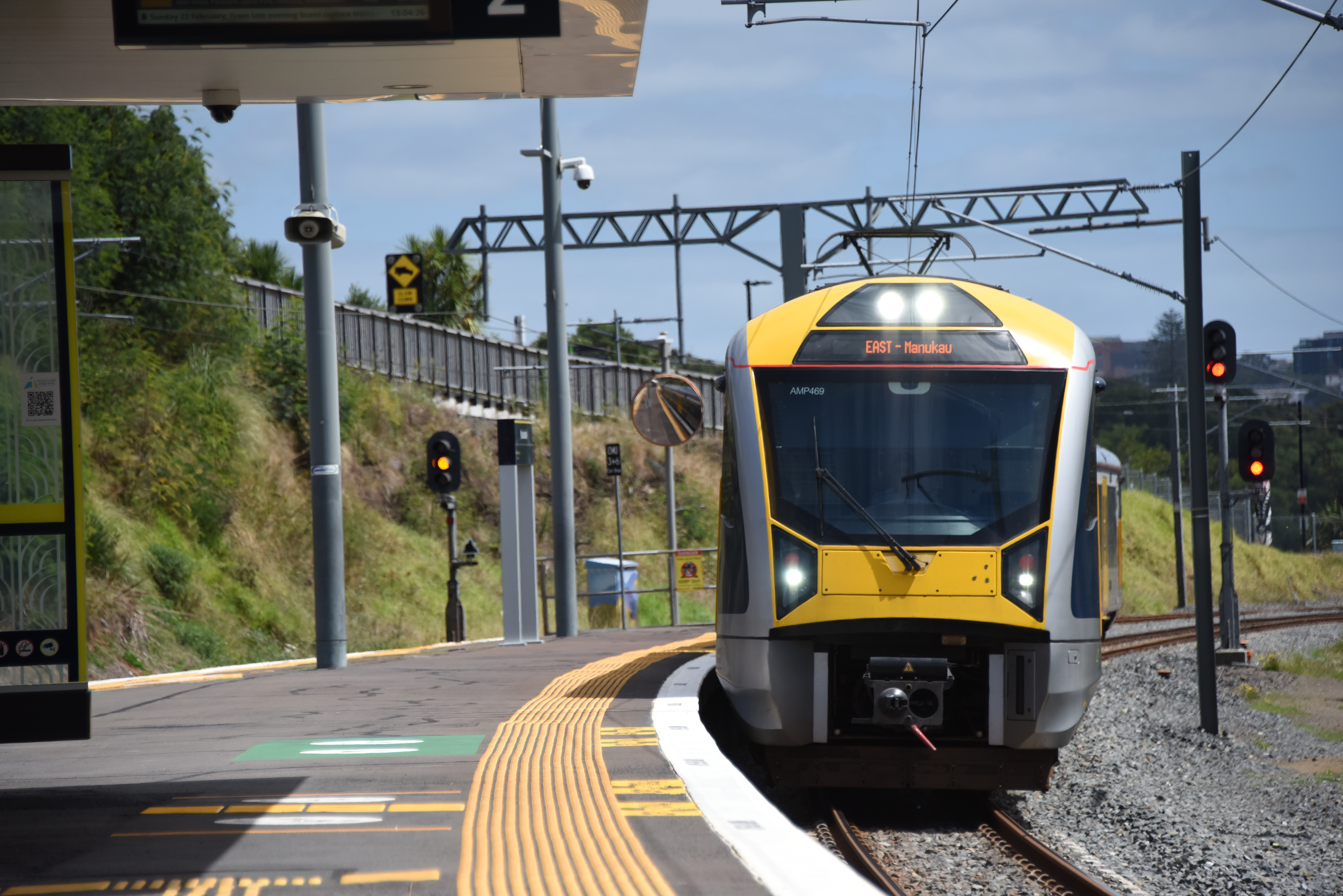
- Eastern line train arrived at Meadowbank station

Overview
- Owner: KiwiRail (tracks and platforms); Auckland Transport (trains and buildings)
- Locale: Auckland
- Termini: Waitematā; Manukau
- Connecting lines: Southern Line; Western Line
- Stations: 11

Service
- Type: Commuter Rail
- System: AT Trains
- Operator: Auckland One Rail
- Rolling stock: AM class

History
- Opened: 16 November 1930 (Westfield Deviation), 7 July 2003 (Britomart Station), 15 April 2012 (Manukau Branch)
- Closed: 13 September 2026

Technical
- Line length: 23 km (14 mi)
- Num of tracks: 2 (Waitematā – Westfield); 3 (Westfield – Wiri); 2 (Wiri – Manukau)
- Track gauge: 1,067 mm (3 ft 6 in)
- Electrification: Overhead line, 25 kV 50 Hz AC

Map

The Eastern Line in Auckland, New Zealand, was the name given to suburban train services that operated between Waitematā and Manukau via Glen Innes and Panmure. Services were operated by Auckland One Rail under the Auckland Transport brand. Following the opening of the City Rail Link, the service has now merged with the Western Line, into the East West line.

In December 2014, all Eastern Line train services began terminating at Manukau, rather than alternating between Manukau and Papakura. Electrification of the Auckland suburban network was completed in July 2015, and all passenger services on this line are electrified.

On 20 March 2023, Ōrākei, Meadowbank, Glen Innes, Panmure and Sylvia Park stations were closed due to Stage 2 of the Rail Network Rebuild, with buses replacing trains on this line between Ōtāhuhu and Britomart in Auckland CBD. The line reopened on 15 January 2024.

== Routing ==
From Waitematā station, previously known as Britomart, Eastern Line services followed the North Island Main Trunk (NIMT) to Puhinui, where they diverged from the NIMT and follow the Manukau Branch line to Manukau.

== Construction ==
The line from Auckland to Westfield via Glen Innes was constructed as the Westfield Deviation of the North Island Main Trunk. This eastern deviation had been proposed as early as the 1870s, but various events meant that it was never constructed, until traffic on the Auckland – Newmarket section of the NIMT began to experience significant delays. The Westfield Deviation avoided the major grades of the route via Newmarket and Remuera, which had a highest point of 81 metres (266 ft) above sea level, compared with the new line's highest point of 24 metres (79 ft).

A small reclamation was made between 1905 and 1916, 2 kilometres (1.2 mi) out of Queen Street into Mechanics Bay for goods yards and maintenance sheds. The remaining 14.28 km (8 miles & 70 chain) section was built as the "Westfield Deviation" between 1924 and 1930 by the Public Works Department as part of general improvements to Auckland's rail network, and authorised (estimated cost £375,000) by the Railways Improvement Authorisation Act 1914.

The Purewa Tunnel, a major engineering work halfway between the city and Glen Innes, was built in the mid-1920s by experienced miners who had worked on the construction of the North Auckland Line.

The section from Mechanics Bay to Ōrākei required significant reclamation over Hobson Bay. At the same time a new road, Tamaki Drive, was built alongside part of the railway line. A notable feature of the deviation is that no road-rail level crossings were created by its construction.

The Westfield Deviation via the Purewa Tunnel opened for goods traffic on 1 September 1929 using the down line to Westfield for single-line working, but was not used for passenger traffic until after the up line to Auckland was opened on 11 May 1930. The construction and opening of this line coincided with the then new Auckland Railway Station. The first passenger train over the line was a Wellington Limited express, when a derailment at Penrose caused it to be diverted on 18 September 1930. The new station and deviation were officially opened on 24 November 1930.

== Replacement ==
From the opening of the City Rail Link on 13 September 2026, the Eastern Line merged with the Western Line to form the East West Line, connecting Swanson to Manukau via Waitemāta and the CRL tunnels.

== Stations ==
Stations on the Eastern Line
Distance from Waitematā	Name	Opened	Notes
0.00 km (0.00 mi)	Waitematā	7 July 2003	Originally called Britomart, until it adopted its new name in September 2025.
4.39 km (2.73 mi)	Ōrākei	16 November 1930	
5.57 km (3.46 mi)	Meadowbank	21 July 1947	Replaced the original Purewa station but was also known as Purewa until 22 February 1954.
9.42 km (5.85 mi)	Glen Innes	6 May 1930	
11.42 km (7.10 mi)	Panmure	3 March 2007	The original Panmure station, located further south, operated passenger services between 16 November 1930 and 9 December 2006.
13.47 km (8.37 mi)	Sylvia Park	2 July 2007	Replaced the original Sylvia Park station, which operated passenger services from 1 September 1929 until 22 January 1966.
17.68 km (10.99 mi)	Ōtāhuhu	20 May 1875	New station and bus-train interchange opened on 29 October 2016.
19.55 km (12.15 mi)	Middlemore	20 July 1947	
21.41 km (13.30 mi)	Papatoetoe	20 May 1875	
22.91 km (14.24 mi)	Puhinui	29 June 1925	New station and bus-train interchange opened July 2021.
25.56 km (15.88 mi)	Manukau	15 April 2012	A bus interchange (Manukau bus station) adjacent to the station was opened in April 2018.

== See also ==
- Public transport in Auckland
- List of Auckland railway stations
