= Quay Park =

Coordinates: 36.84792°S 174.7788°E

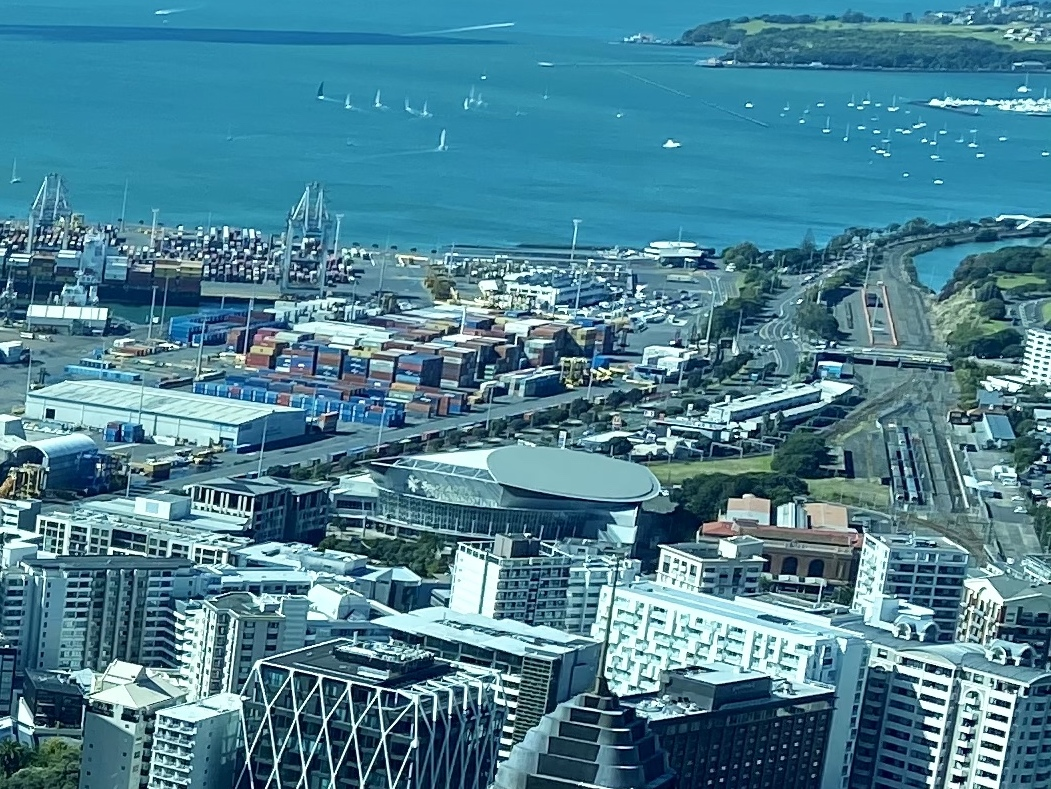
Quay Park seen from the Sky Tower

Quay Park is a junction on the Auckland railway network in New Zealand. It normally links Waitematā with Parnell station for the and South City Line which use a set of tracks (the Newmarket Line) between Waitematā and Newmarket. The Strand station has been closed to suburban train services since the opening of Britomart in 2003 and is now used as the terminus for the Auckland–Wellington Northern Explorer service via the North Island Main Trunk line and for chartered excursions. The junction can be switched in order to use The Strand as a backup for Britomart if required.

The Wiri to Quay Park project announced in 2017 is expected to ease congestion on Auckland rail lines, improve rail freight access from the Port of Auckland to the Westfield yards and allow more frequent passenger and freight services. It is associated with the future third mainline. Funding for the project was announced in 2020. The project is to start in 2020 and be completed in 2024. The work at Quay Park will include adding two scissor crossings and separating freight from commuter tracks.

== See also ==
- List of Auckland railway stations
