= Purewa Tunnel =

Railway Tunnel in Auckland

Coordinates: 36°52′16.61″S 174°50′54.4″E

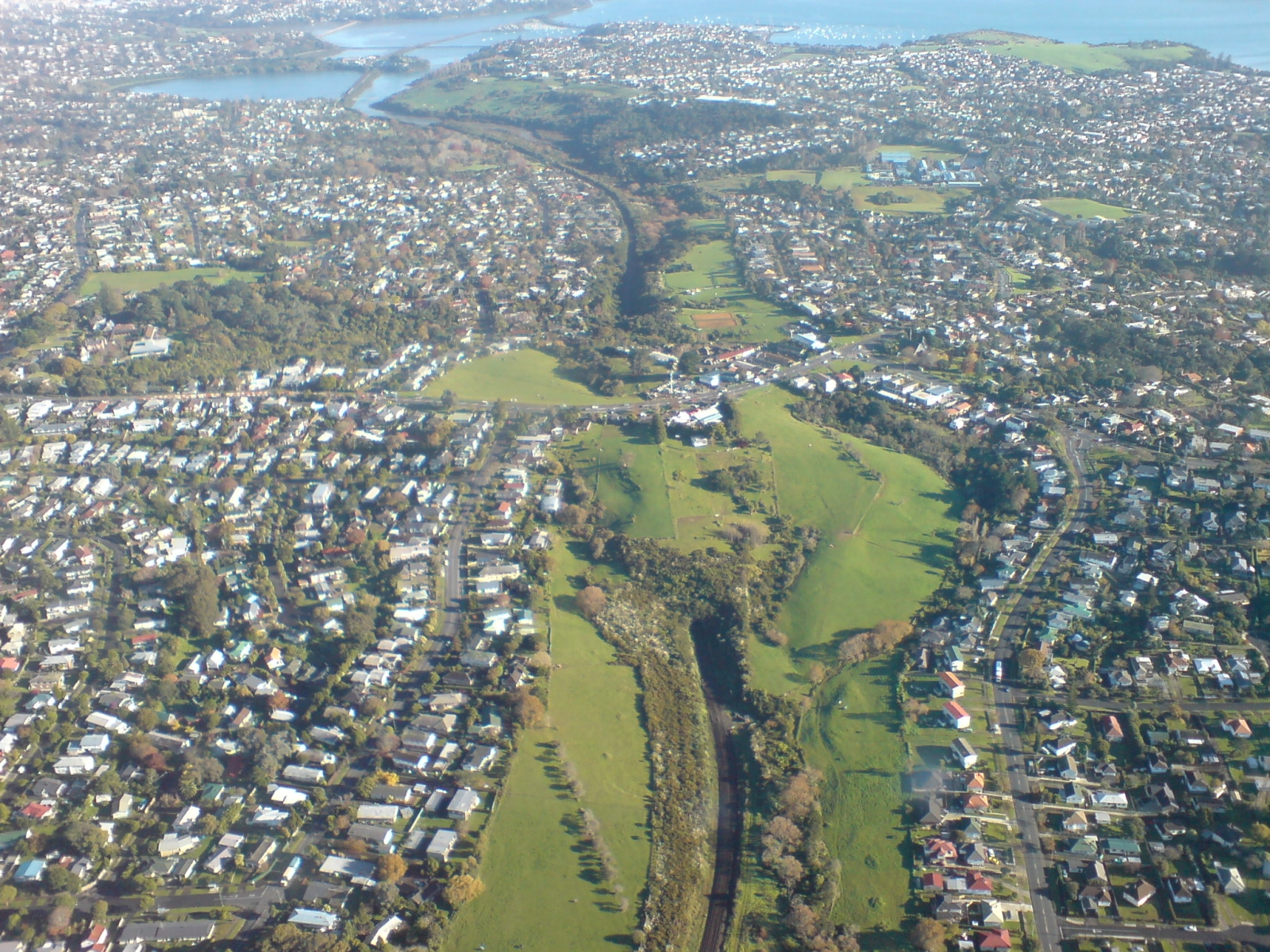
- The eastern tunnel portal from the air, looking west
- Interactive map of Purewa Tunnel

Overview
- Line: North Island Main Trunk railway
- Location: Saint Johns
- Status: Open
- System: New Zealand Railways
- No. of stations: None

Operation
- Opened: 1 September 1929
- Operator: KiwiRail
- Character: Passenger/freight

Technical
- Line length: 1,954 ft (596 m)
- No. of tracks: Double
- Track gauge: 3 ft 6 in (1,067 mm)
- Electrified: 2016

Purewa Tunnel is a 596-metre-long (1,955 ft) rail tunnel in Auckland, New Zealand. It is on the North Island Main Trunk line and is located in the suburb of Saint Johns, to the west of Glen Innes. The tunnel is concrete-lined. East West Line passenger services operate through it, and it is also used by the Northern Explorer and freight services.

== Background ==
Proposals were made as early as the 1870s to re-route the Auckland–Westfield section of the North Island Main Trunk via a new eastern route through Glen Innes. Referred to as the Westfield Deviation, this was an easier grade than the NIMT's relatively steep uphill grade from central Auckland to Newmarket and Remuera. By the 1920s, increasing traffic and delays between Auckland and Newmarket made the new route necessary.

== Construction ==
The tunnel was started in March 1925 by workers experienced in the 'hard school... [of] the notorious railway tunnels of North Auckland' (i.e. constructing the North Auckland Line). With the assistance of horse-driven carts, the mining workers, mostly British (with some Italians and Dalmatians in the groups preparing the approach cuttings), were reported to have made good progress, working in triple shifts, using gelignite emplaced in drill holes to fracture the rock.

The tunnel, while lit by electric lights during the excavation, was described as hosting a large number of glowworms, giving it a 'weird and fantastical' appeal. Miners reported that the worms, likely to have entered from the nearby bush-clad gullies, were unlike anything they had ever reported in a working tunnel. Further, the tunnel was also strangely attractive to a large number of sparrows that came to populate it, living from pilfered horse feed and becoming quite inured to the regular explosions.

Break through was in April 1926 and the tunnel was completed in March 1928. The Westfield Deviation, including the tunnel, opened for goods traffic on 1 September 1929, using the down line to Westfield Junction for single-line working, but was not used for passenger traffic until the up line to Auckland was opened on 11 May 1930.

== Later work ==
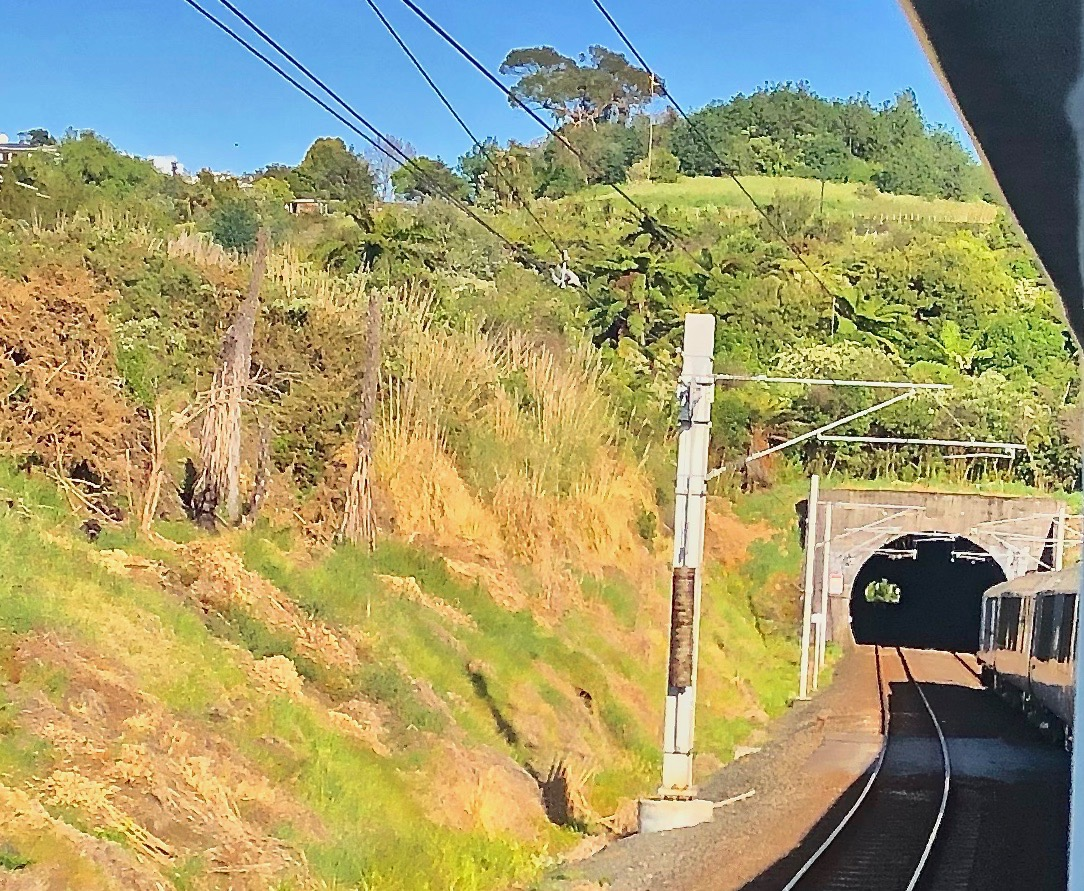
Purewa Tunnel eastern portal in 2019

The tunnel has in the past experienced some significant water drainage issues, which have required remedial work, and the installation of speed restrictions. In 2010/2011, tracks within the tunnel were lowered to allow the required clearance for the Auckland railway electrification project.
