= Newmarket railway station, Auckland =

Train station in New Zealand

Newmarket
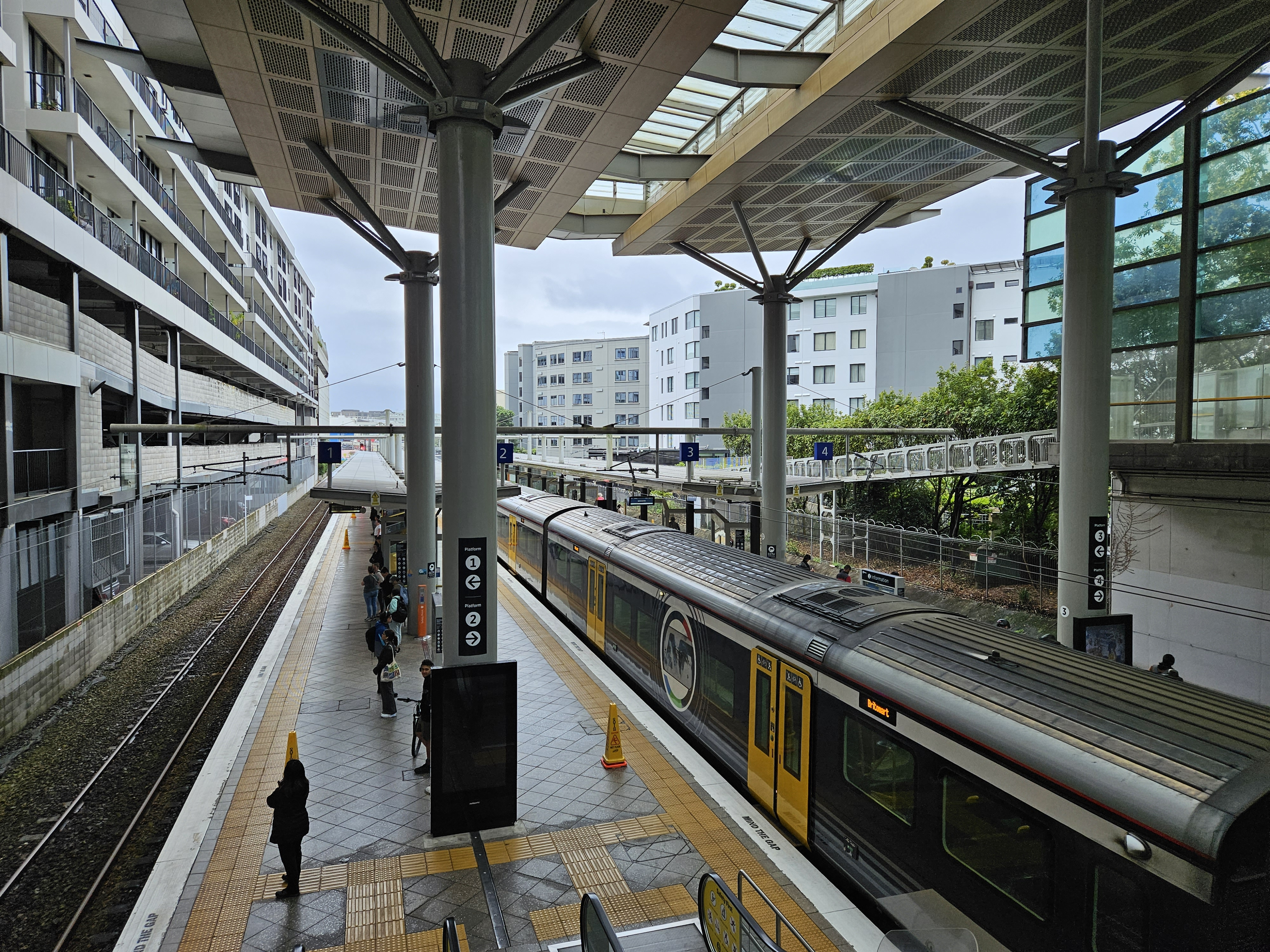
- Newmarket railway station in 2023

General information
- Location: Newmarket, Auckland; New Zealand
- Coordinates: 36°52′11″S 174°46′44″E
- System: Auckland Transport Urban rail
- Owner: KiwiRail (track and platforms); Auckland Transport (buildings)
- Operator: Auckland One Rail
- Lines: North Auckland Line (NAL); Newmarket Line
- Distance: 8.40 km (5.22 mi) from Westfield Junction (NAL)
- Platforms: First island platform (P1 & P2); Second island platform (P3 & P4)
- Tracks: Mainline (3)

Construction
- Parking: No
- Cycle facilities: Yes
- Accessible: Yes (Lifts)

Other information
- Station code: NMT
- Fare zone: City/Isthmus (overlap)

History
- Opened: 20 December 1873
- Rebuilt: January 2008–January 2010
- Electrified: April 2014
- Former names: Newmarket Junction

Passengers
- CY 2018: 2,560,428

Services
Preceding station	Auckland Transport (Auckland One Rail)	Following station
Grafton towards Henderson	Onehunga West Line	Remuera towards Onehunga
Remuera towards Pukekohe	South City Line	Grafton towards Newmarket
Terminus	South City Line	Parnell towards Pukekohe via Waitemata
Former services
Preceding station	Auckland Transport (Auckland One Rail)	Following station
Terminus	Onehunga Line pre-2026	Remuera towards Onehunga
Parnell towards Waitematā	Southern Line pre-2026	Remuera towards Pukekohe
Parnell towards Waitematā	Western Line pre-2026	Grafton towards Swanson
Location

Newmarket railway station is a station in the inner-city suburb of Newmarket in Auckland, New Zealand. It serves the South City and Onehunga West lines of the Auckland railway network, and is the second-busiest station in Auckland, after Waitematā.

The station was opened on 20 December 1873. It was completely rebuilt between 2008 and 2010 and now consists of two island platforms serving three tracks with a concourse above the southern end of the station. The redeveloped station opened on 14 January 2010.

== History ==
=== First station ===
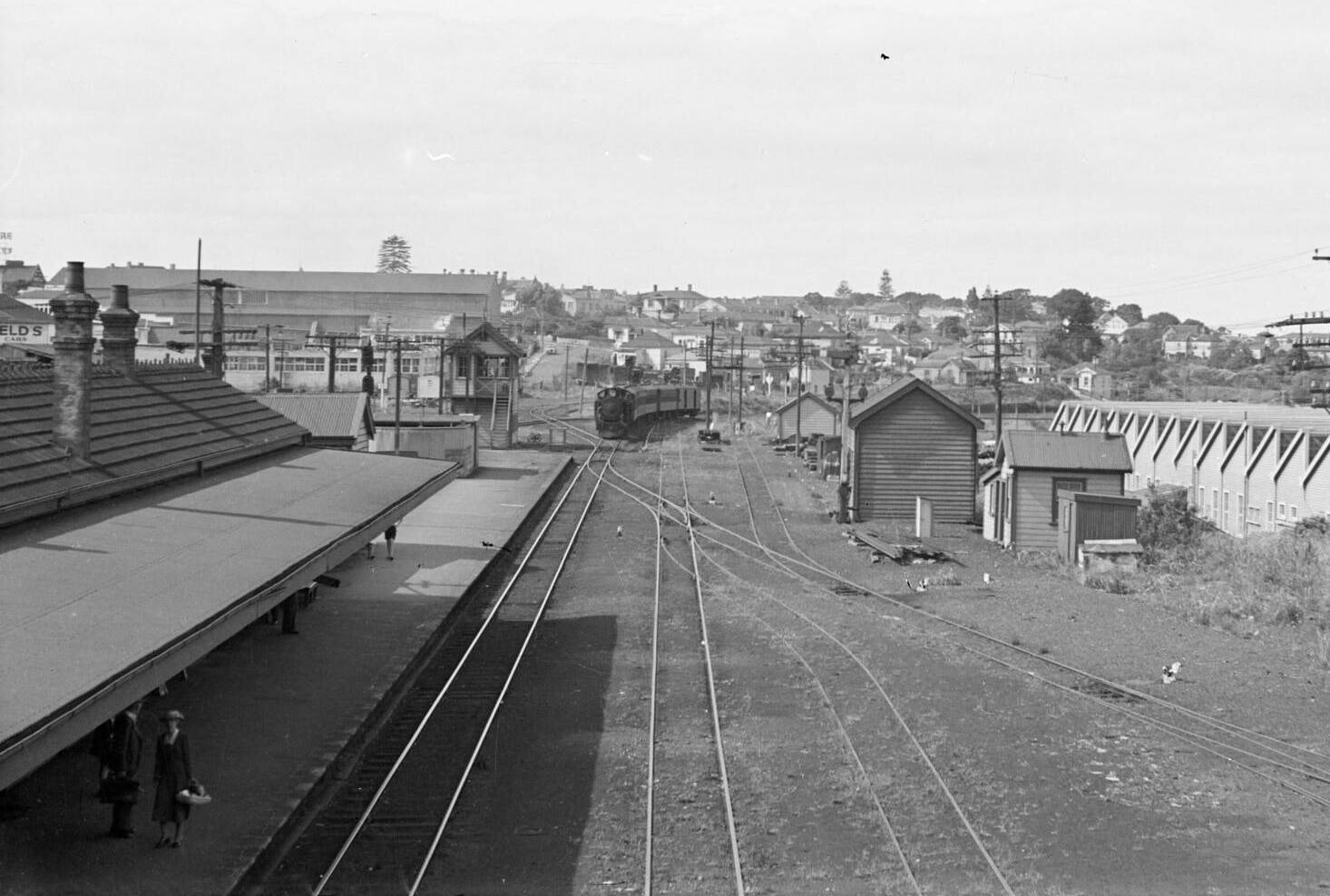
Newmarket Station in the 1940s

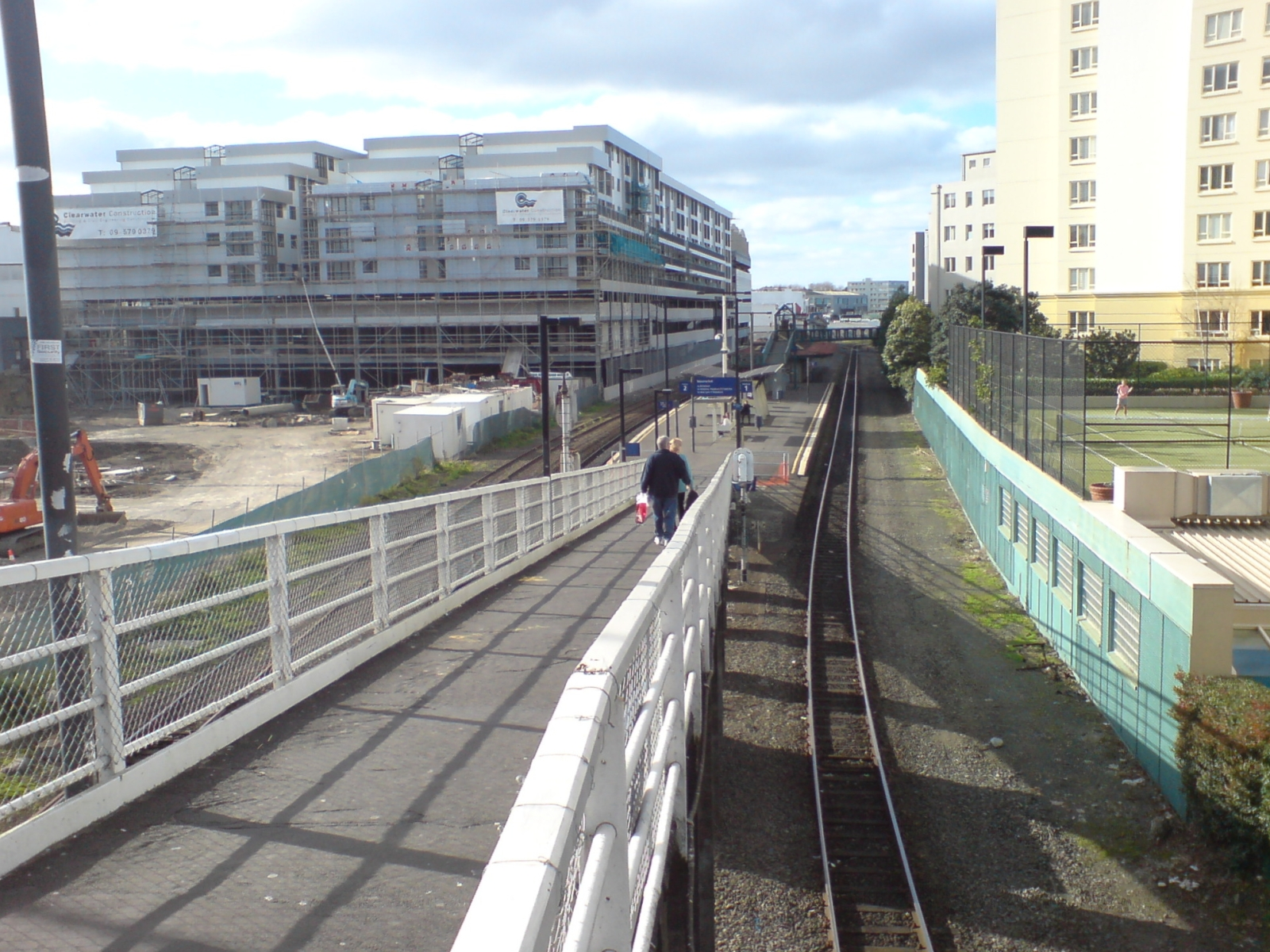
Newmarket railway station in 2007, viewed from Remuera Road

The first sod of the Auckland and Drury Railway was turned on 16 February 1865, near the Junction Hotel, Newmarket by the Auckland Superintendent, Robert Graham.

The station was opened on 20 December 1873 and in its historic configuration it consisted of a single island, accessed by a ramp from Remuera Road (opposite Nuffield Street) and a pedestrian overbridge between Broadway and Joseph Banks Terrace. The original station building was one of four island platform station buildings in Auckland designed and built by George Troup, Chief Engineer for the New Zealand Railways Department. It was built in 1908, at the time of the installation of double track.

The signal box at the northern end of the platform was built at the same time and was one of the few of that era on its original site and still in operation in the late 20th century, being the last full-sized lever frame box on the national network.

Newmarket was also the site of Newmarket Workshops, which opened in 1878, and closed in 1927, when Otahuhu Workshops opened.

The historic configuration of the station, near Newmarket Junction (the junction of the Western and Southern Lines), forced some unusual movements. Trains from the city had to run past the junction to call at the station. There were two platforms in an island configuration, and all city-bound trains stopped at one platform, outbound trains stopping at the other. This was confusing as the outward-bound platform served both the Southern and Western Lines. This problem was partially solved by 'splitting' the platform into two: Southern Line trains stopped at the southern end of the platform, Western Line at the northern end. However the platform was short, so this did not always resolve the confusion.

The above practice became less prevalent following the higher frequency of the July 2007 timetable. From then trains used whichever platform was free, and could arrive without any indication of destination. Off-peak operations usually followed the traditional practice, but during the peak this was not practical. This led to passengers' confusion as to which train ran on which line.

During peak times, Veolia staff were often present with megaphones to inform passengers of train destinations. The signal box was attended 24 hours per day and had control of all trains within the station and Junction.

==== Station building ====
The fate of the old station building was controversial, with various proposals being put forward to demolish, refurbish, or relocate the building. Following the announcement on 14 March 2007 of the budget for the station's upgrade, Minister of Finance Michael Cullen announced that $5 million would be put towards moving the building, possibly to a proposed new station at Parnell where it would serve as a station for the Auckland War Memorial Museum in the Auckland Domain.

The signal box was closed in early 2008, and it and the station building were removed from the site on 3 March 2008 to an undisclosed storage location, as ONTRACK feared they would be vandalised. The station building was moved to Parnell station in time for the start of services on 12 March 2017 and the official opening of the station on 13 March 2017.

=== Redeveloped station ===
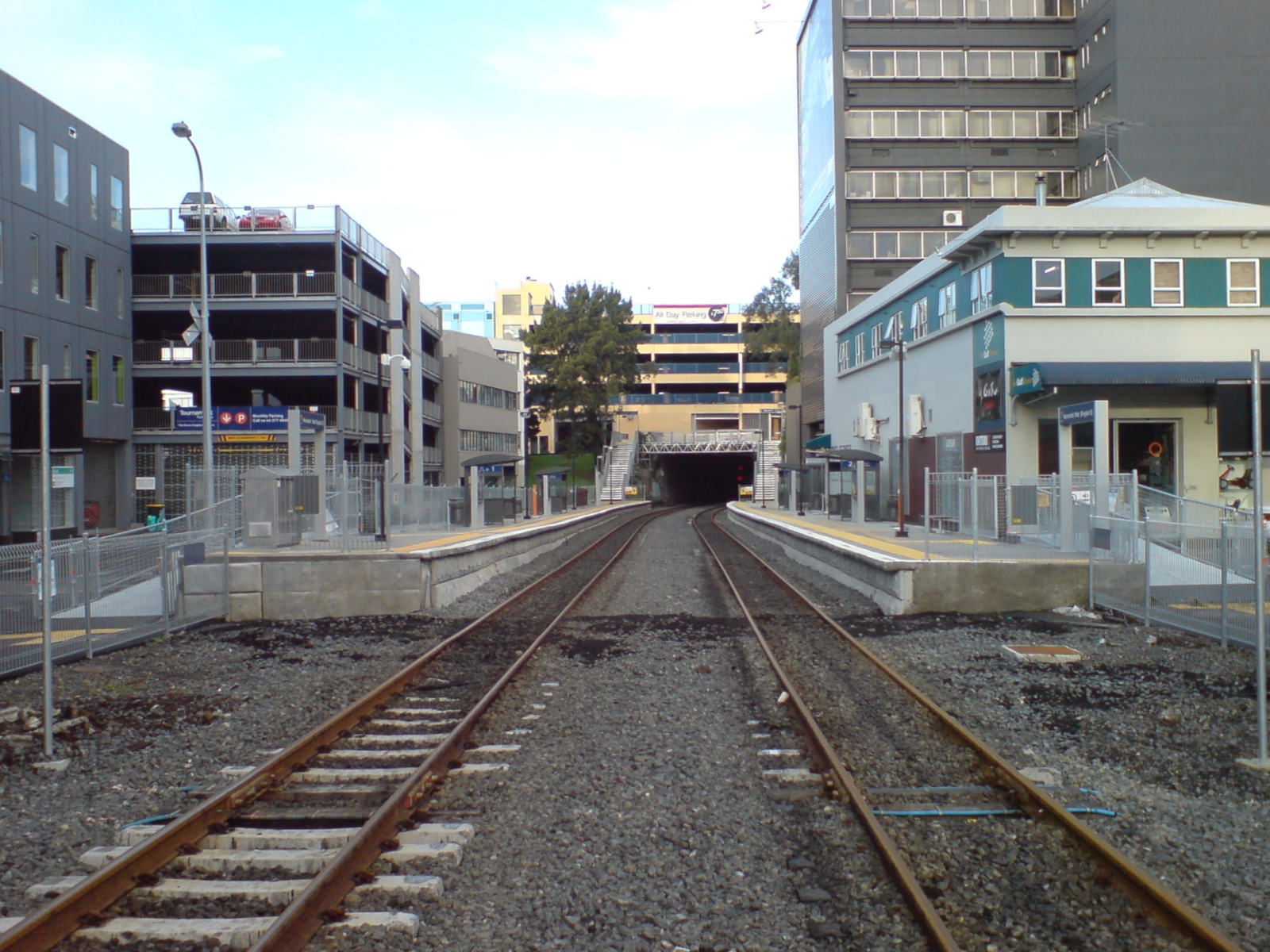
Newmarket West, one of two temporary stations that served the area while the new station was being built

Newmarket station was rebuilt for NZ$35 million between January 2008 and January 2010 as part of ONTRACK's Project DART. It was necessary to close the station for the rebuild and two temporary stations were built: Newmarket South, approximately 200m south on the Southern Line, and Newmarket West (also called Kingdon Street) on the Western Line. Both stations were demolished later. As well as modernising the facilities and appearance, the redevelopment improved connections between the station and the surrounding commercial and residential areas. The station now has a concourse level above the platforms, and entrances from a new square off Broadway, a 65m long covered bridge (capable of carrying emergency vehicles) off Remuera Road, and a pedestrian bridge from Joseph Banks Terrace, from the Remuera side.

The station retains the option of extending the concourse, with pedestrian entry off Broadway further north possible in the future. The current entrance off Broadway may also be widened, with Auckland Council considering demolishing two shops to widen the passage. Some criticism was made at the time of opening about the high step up into trains, which was considered necessary by the designers to allow freight trains to pass the platforms. Authorities noted that this was the same height as at other stations throughout the Auckland system with the exception of Waitematā, which does not have freight trains passing. Authorities confirmed the vertical distance to step up to some train carriages would be up to 374 mm, but this would be reduced with the introduction of the new carriages specifically designed for the electrification of the Auckland network.

==== New track layout ====
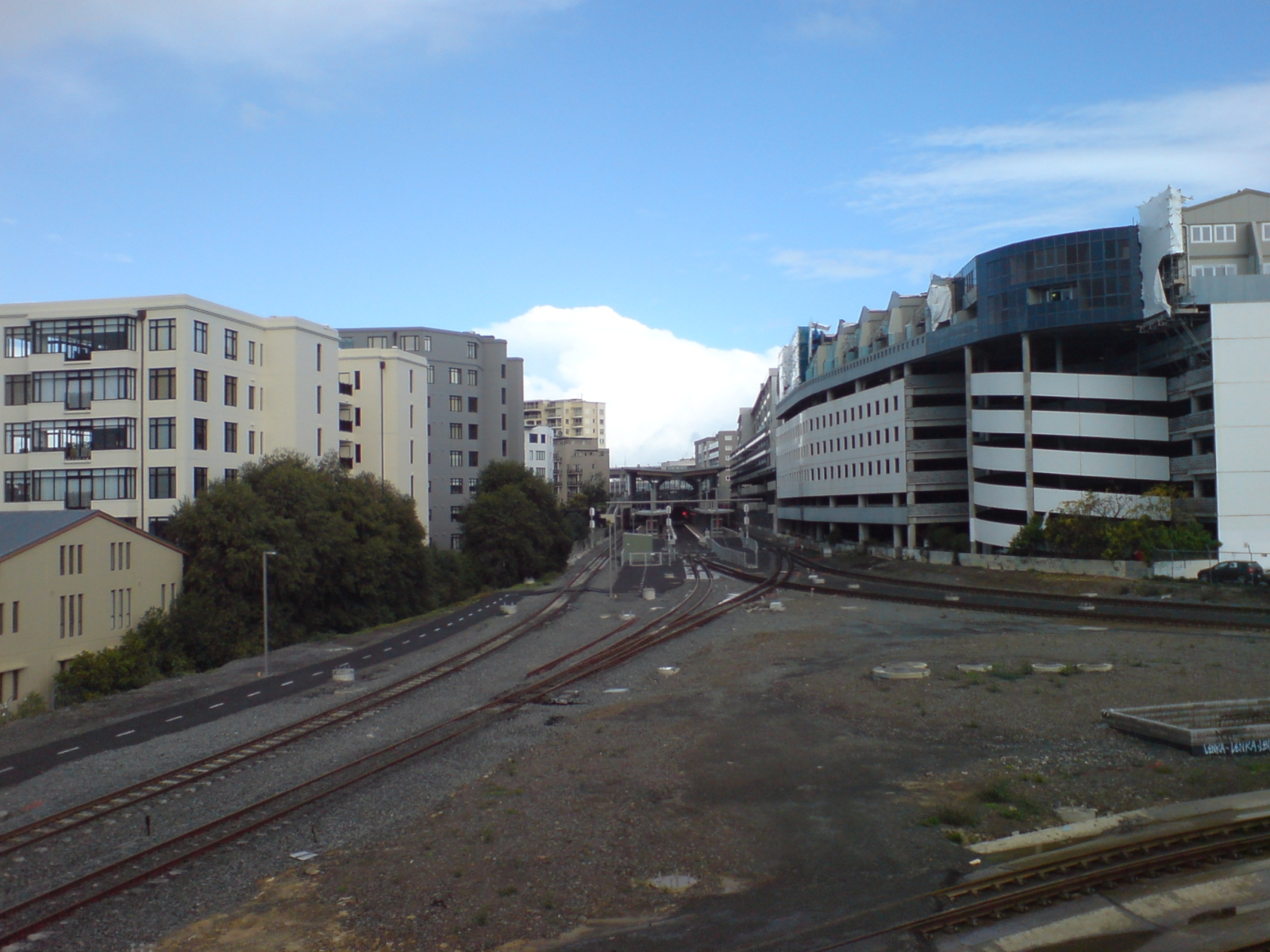
A view of the station from the north, showing the new track layout

Integral to the redevelopment was the requirement to reorganise the track layout. The new station has twin islands and three tracks. Each island has two platforms. Generally, Platform One serves westbound services on the Western Line and northbound services on the Southern Line. Platform Two serves Britomart bound services and is also the terminating platform for Onehunga Line services. Platform Four serves southbound services on the Onehunga and Southern Lines. The station cost an estimated NZ$25 million to redevelop (paid for by ARTA), and ONTRACK spent around NZ$45 million to change the layout. The project has been called the most challenging in the whole upgrade of Auckland's railway network.

Western Line trains reverse direction to leave the station, requiring the driver to get out and walk to the other end of the train and adding two to three minutes to each trip.

From 18 March 2018, Britomart bound Western Line trains began to open both sets of doors on Platforms Two and Three, allowing for easy transfers between Southern, Western and Onehunga Line trains.

==== Pedestrian access ====
The main entrance from the concourse opens onto Station Square, a large plaza located on the western side of the station which is linked to Broadway and Remuera Road by a pair of covered passages. There is also a covered bridge connecting the concourse to Remuera Road to the south and a smaller bridge connecting the concourse to Joseph Banks Terrace to the east. There are also proposals for a future northern entrance which would link the concourse to another entrance on Broadway opposite the Olympic Pools.

==== Electrification ====
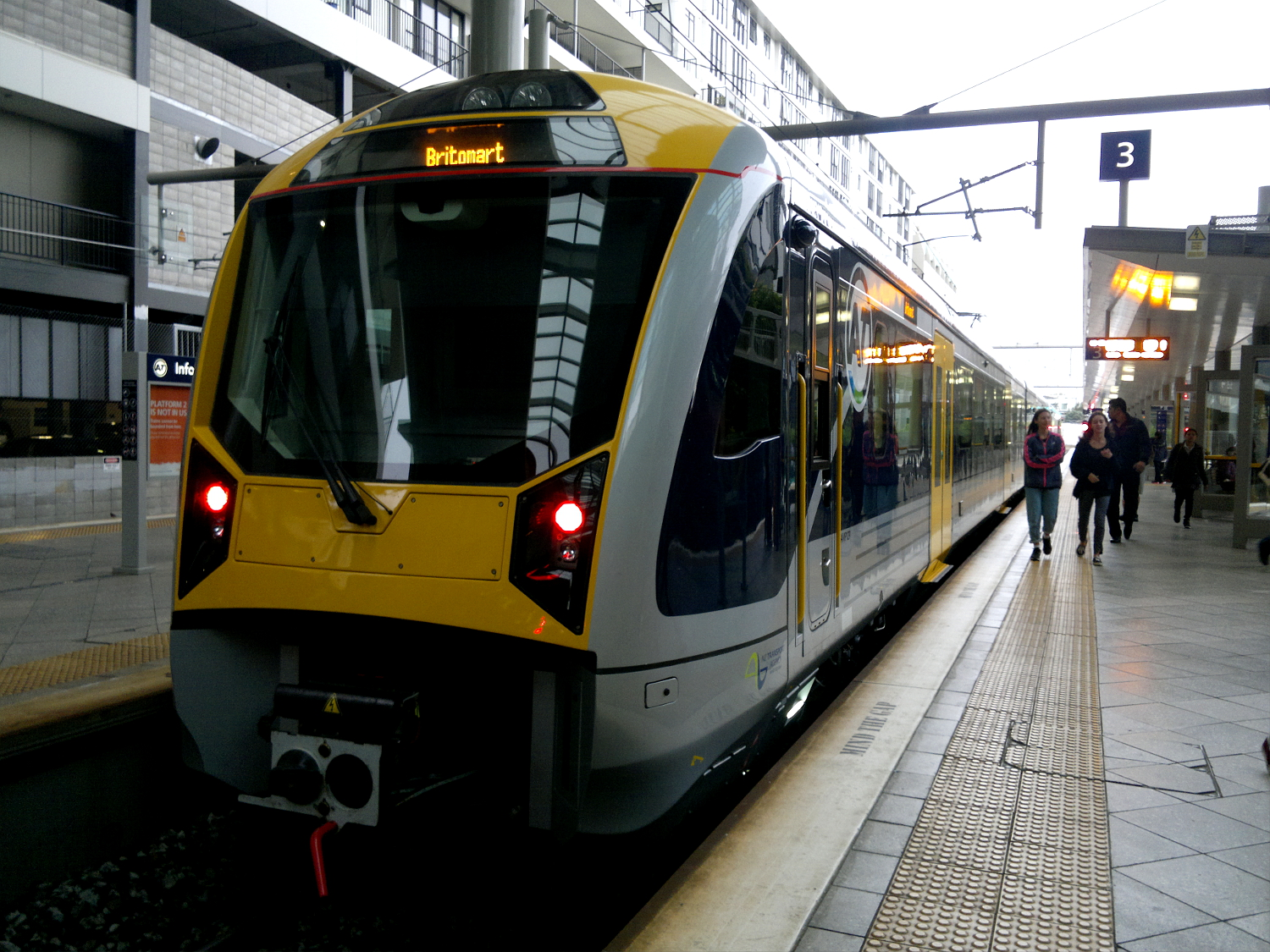
An AM class train at Newmarket Station on the day of their introduction to passenger services.

On 27 April 2014, Auckland's new AM class electric trains were debuted to the general public in a celebratory open day held at Britomart Transport Centre. As part of the day's events, 5000 Aucklanders were able to take a free ride on one of the new trains from Britomart, to Newmarket station and back.

The electric trains officially entered public service on the rail network's Onehunga Line the following day.

==== Awards ====
The station's lighting design engineer, Opus International Consultants, won three New Zealand IES Lighting design awards in 2010 for the lighting design: an Award of Excellence, Award of Commendation and the Trends People's Choice Award for the innovative LED lantern box design on Remuera Road.

The station and its architects, Opus and Herriot + Melhuish:Architecture, won best building award in the "Urban Design" category in 2011, awarded by the New Zealand Institute of Architects.

== Services ==
Auckland One Rail, on behalf of Auckland Transport, operates suburban services to City Centre, Henderson, Maungawhau, Onehunga, and Pukekohe.

== See also ==
- List of Auckland railway stations
