= Wiri railway station =

Railway station in Auckland, New Zealand

Coordinates: 37°00′08″S 174°51′45″E

Wiri
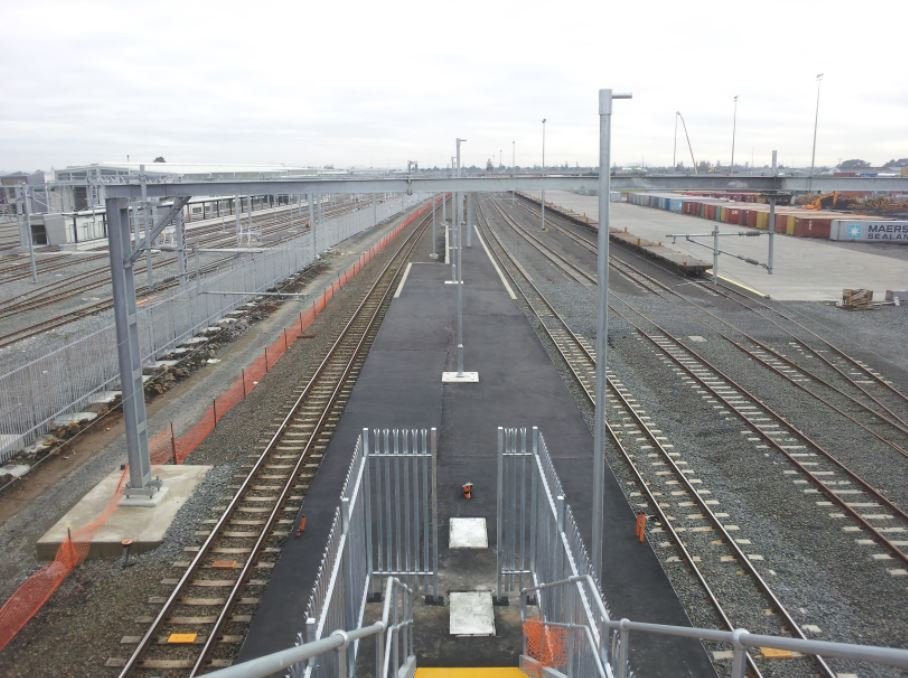
- Looking down the stairs from the pedestrian bridge which provides access to the platform.

General information
- Other names: Wiri Depot Platform
- Location: Wiri, Auckland; New Zealand
- Owner: Auckland Transport
- Operator: Auckland One Rail
- Line: North Island Main Trunk
- Distance: 657.60 km (408.61 mi) from Wellington
- Platforms: Island platform (Up Main and Down Main)
- Tracks: West Main; Up Main; Down Main; Wiri East Sidings

Construction
- Parking: Yes (Staff only)
- Accessible: No

Other information
- Station code: WIR

History
- Opened: 9 December 1913
- Closed: 14 February 2005
- Rebuilt: 5 July 2013
- Electrified: April 2014

Passengers
- Staff only, used for train crew changeovers

Adjacent stations
Preceding station	KiwiRail	Following station
Puhinui	North Island Main Trunk	Homai
Location

Wiri railway station is a station on the Southern Line of the Auckland Railway Network in New Zealand. Used exclusively for train crew operations, it is not open to the public.

The station has a small platform and shelter building, and a pedestrian bridge providing access to the platform from Wiri Maintenance & Stabling Depot (Wiri Depot). Access to the platform is controlled by the depot.

Wiri yard and station are adjacent to Matukutūruru, a scoria cone once reaching 60 metres higher than the surrounding land, which was quarried away to provide a supply of ballast for New Zealand Railways. The original station was not constructed primarily as a passenger station, but as an 'industrial' station to provide access for quarry workers.

Wiri Junction is at the northern end of the station - where trains switch between Ports of Auckland Inland Port, Wiri depot, the Manukau Branch and the North Island Main Trunk. To the north is Puhinui railway station and to the south is Homai railway station.

== History ==
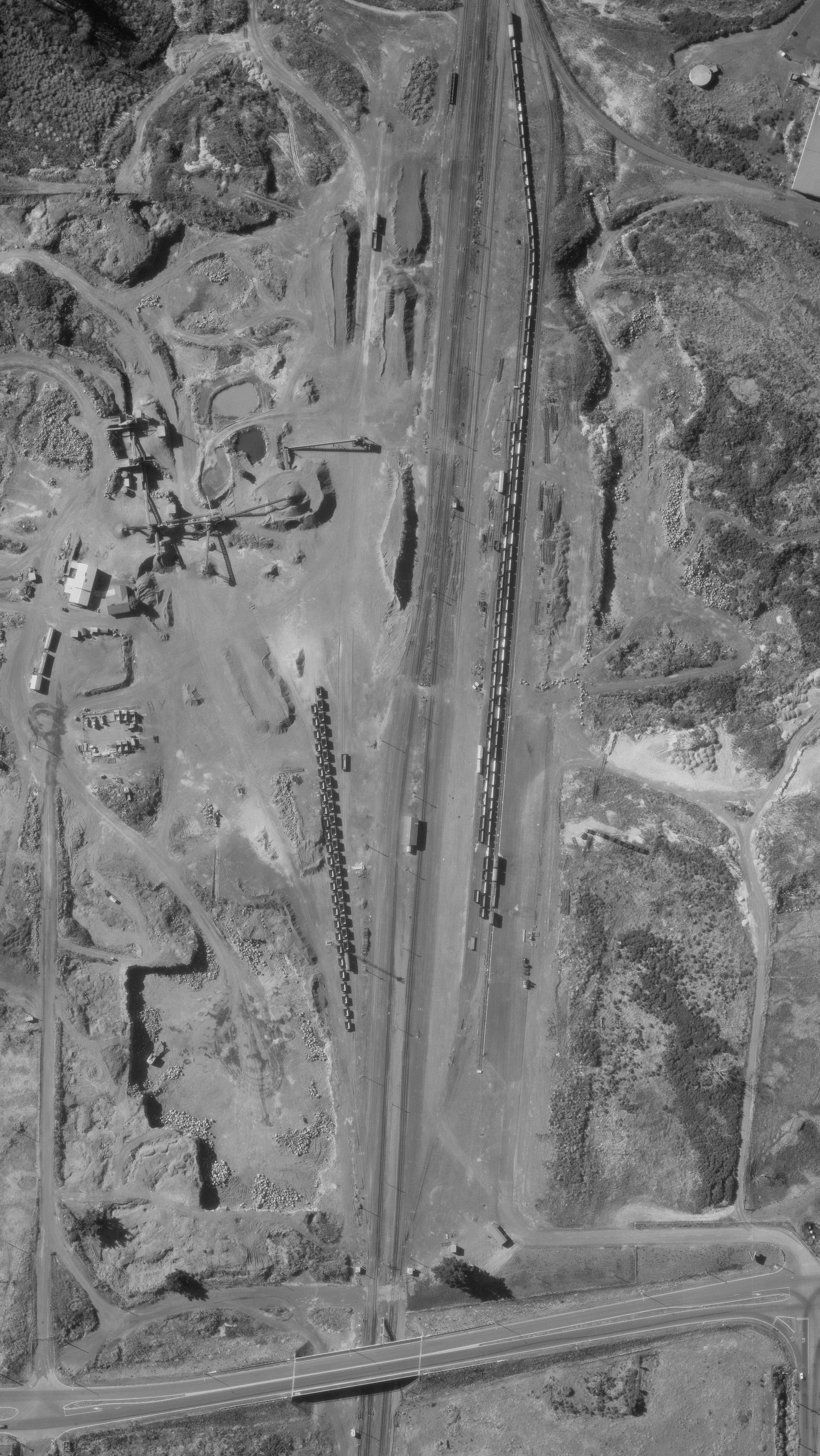
The station in 1982. To the left is a basalt quarry on the northern lava flows of Matukutūruru, on the right is the Auckland Harbour Board's freight terminal.

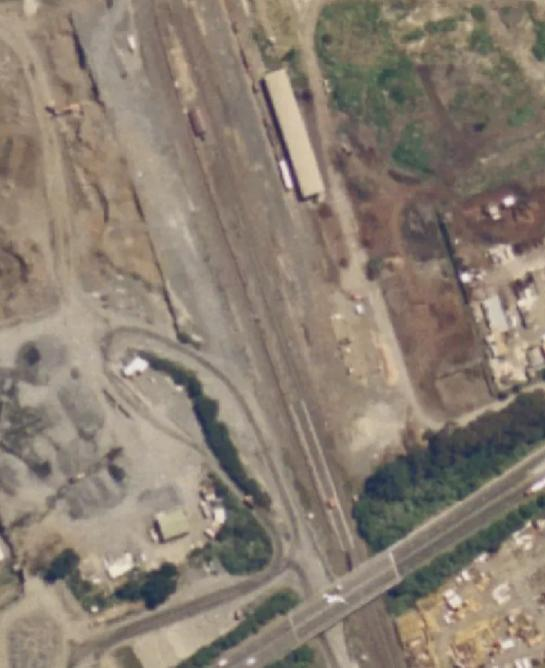
Excerpt from orthophotomosaic captured 2003–2004 showing the 1994 platform and shelter near the bridge.

An application for a station at Wiri was submitted in July 1912. The following year a tablet porter was hired, a tablet changer was erected, and on 7 August 1913 it opened as a switch out tablet station.

On 9 December 1913 the station opened for passengers as a flag station. A small station building was completed in 1914 at a cost of £382.11s.8d; it was divided into three parts—a waiting room, station office and storeroom. In 1915 a 120m x 4.5m ground-level asphalt platform was constructed, along with a loading bank for freight. In 1924 a telephone line was added.

In 1917 the New Zealand Railways Department developed Wiri North Quarry to the west of the station on the northern lava flows of Matukutūruru. This was used to supply ballast for the railways, eventually replacing the Mt Albert and Mt Smart pits; these closed in 1928 and the 1960s, respectively. The station’s main source of passenger traffic is likely to have been related to the quarry.

The station was located some distance from the Great South Road, with access via a narrow, unformed country lane. Circa 1922–1923 the lane was widened, re-formed, and legalised, becoming Wiri Station Road. The western stretch of the road, between the railway station and Roscommon Road, was initially known as Whites Road.

Following duplication of the tracks in 1931 Wiri became an island station, with the construction of the new Down Main on the eastern side, and the old Main becoming the Up Main. Pedestrian access was by footpath from the Wiri Station Road level crossing to the south.

In 1968 a flush toilet for staff was added to the station building, connected to a septic tank. In 1970 the roof of the building was altered to improve track clearance by cutting back the verandahs.

Auckland Harbour Board constructed a freight terminal next to the station in 1978. This was subsequently transferred to the Port of Auckland. In June 2009 construction began on a rail exchange on 5 hectares of adjacent KiwiRail land with three sidings, 2km of track, and a large hardstand. In 2010 the Wiri Intermodal Freight Hub opened as an inland port, with KiwiRail running four services of 23 wagons a week in each direction. By 2014 this had increased to sixteen services a week. In 2017 a 3500m² warehouse building was opened on the site, enabling efficient transfer of freight to and from containers.

In February 1981 the Wiri Station Road overbridge was opened, with stairs providing access to the station footpath. This replaced a dangerous seven-track level crossing. Excavated fill from Matukutūruru was used for the development.

On 21 November 1986, Mayor of Manukau City, Barry Curtis, announced plans to establish a mini-monorail system at Manukau City Centre ahead of the 1990 Commonwealth Games, with a later extension to the railway line at Wiri. The plans were later abandoned.

In 1994 a new raised platform with small shelter was constructed closer to the bridge.

=== Closure ===
The station closed on 14 February 2005 because it had the lowest patronage in Auckland. Up until this point Wiri was a minor stopping place for local passenger services and was retained as a non timetabled station.

Until 2011 the old station building held equipment to operate nearby points and signals. After extensive changes to the track system the equipment was made redundant. The building was transferred to the Papatoetoe Railway Station Preservation Trust and in 2012 it was relocated to a site on Cavendish Drive, then in 2014 it was relocated again to Puhinui Reserve. On 12 April 2022 the Trust donated the building to the Museum of Transport and Technology. On 8 November 2022 it was relocated to an interim site behind Waititiko Station, outside MOTAT 2. MOTAT plans to remove the existing station buildings and resite the Wiri one in their place.

On 15 April 2012 the Manukau Branch opened. The branch connects to the North Island Main Trunk to the north of the station at Wiri Junction.

=== Re-opening ===
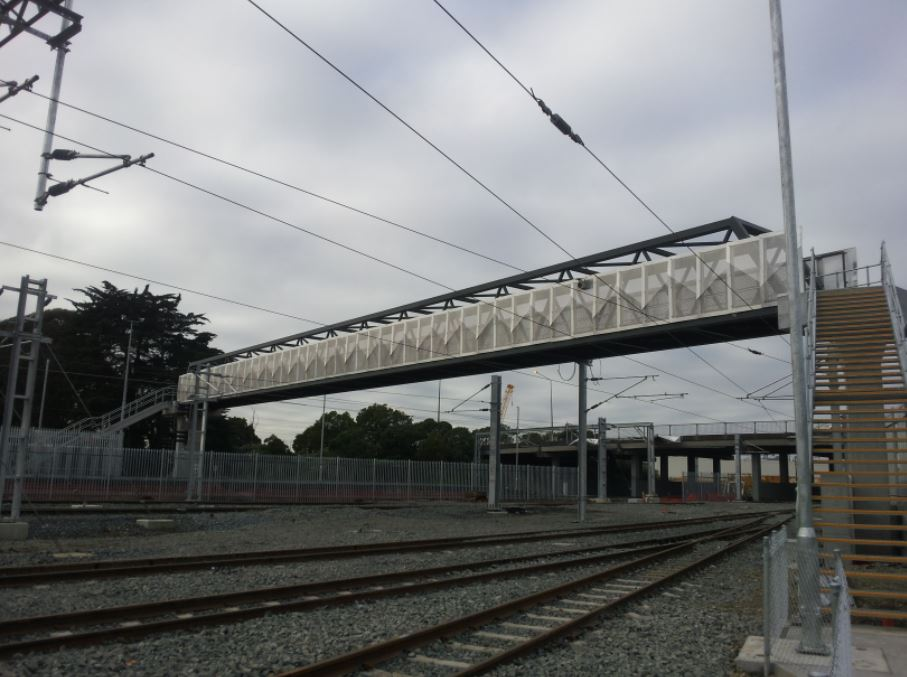
A pedestrian overbridge provides access to Wiri Railway Station from the adjacent depot.

On 5 July 2013, Wiri Depot - an extensive maintenance facility with stabling for 28 three-car trains - was opened near the former station in preparation for the arrival of Auckland's new electric trains. The station was re-opened for train crew changes. The upgraded station platform is accessed by a bridge that connects to the depot.

Used exclusively for train crew operations, it is not open to the public. A sign reading "Platform 9¾" was installed on one of the plaform shelters, a reference to the platform in the fictional universe of Harry Potter, which is accessed by magically walking through a solid barrier.

Completed in 2025, the Third Main Line passes through the station, ending at Wiri Junction.

== See also ==
- Wiri Maintenance & Stabling Depot
- Westfield railway station, closed in 2017, was next to Westfield marshalling yard
- List of Auckland railway stations
