= Wiri depot =

Train maintenance and stabling facility in Auckland, New Zealand

Coordinates: 37°00′03″S 174°51′41″E

Wiri Maintenance and Stabling Depot
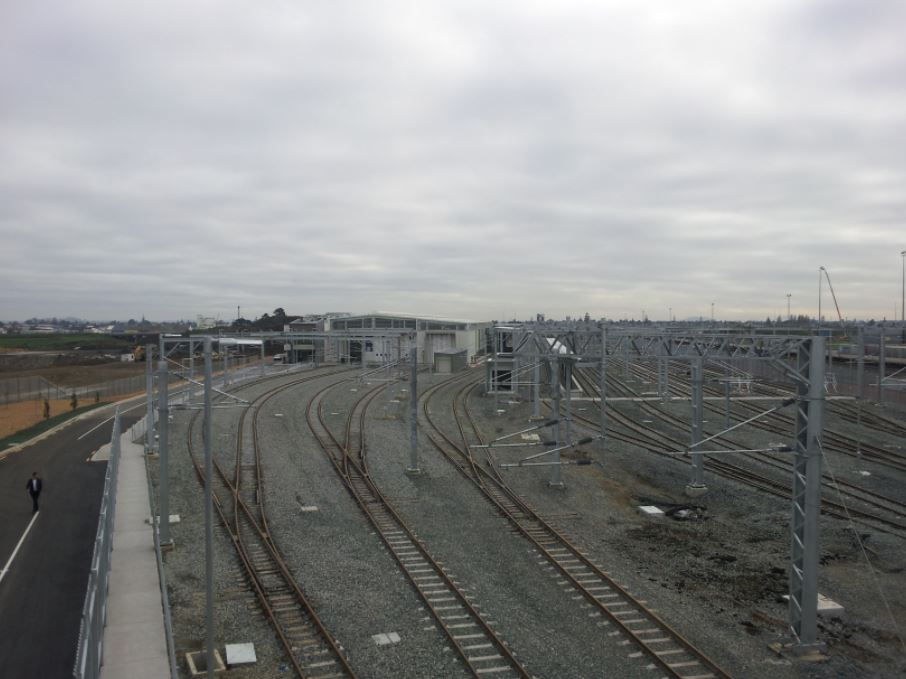
- Tracks entering the maintenance building and stabling facilities, 2013.
- Interactive map of Wiri Maintenance and Stabling Depot

Location
- Location: Wiri, Auckland, New Zealand

Characteristics
- Owner: Auckland Transport
- Operator: Auckland One Rail
- Type: EMU
- Roads: 17

History
- Opened: 5 July 2013

Wiri Maintenance and Stabling Depot (Wiri Depot) is the main maintenance and stabling facility for Auckland Transport's electric multiple unit trains, owned by Auckland Transport and operated by Auckland One Rail. It is located in Wiri next to the North Island Main Trunk railway line, close to the junction with the Manukau Branch line.

Each train visits the depot at least once a month for maintenance, undergoing minor inspections every 1,000 kilometres.

== Facilities ==
=== Maintenance workshop ===
The maintenance workshop has three tracks, with two electrified. A Windhoff ZRW 35AEM remote-controlled battery-powered shunter is used to maneuver trains.

Equipment includes built-in underfloor lifting jacks for a complete trainset, bogie turntable, underfloor wheel lathe, and gantry cranes.

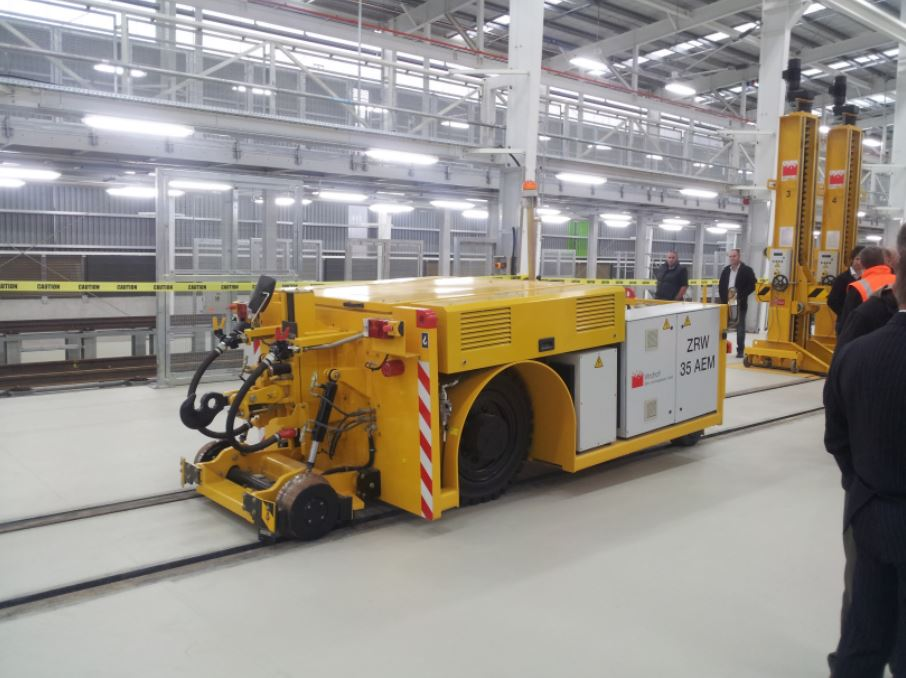
A Windhoff ZRW 35AEM remote-controlled battery shunter is used to move trains in the workshop.

=== Stabling roads ===
Wiri depot was built with seven outdoor stabling roads each able to take four 72 metre long three-car EMUs. In November 2024 10 additional roads were added.

A dedicated platform provides access for cleaning the train interior.

=== Main line platform ===
A footbridge connects the depot with a staff platform on the main line, allowing easy access for changing train crews during regular service.

=== Office building ===
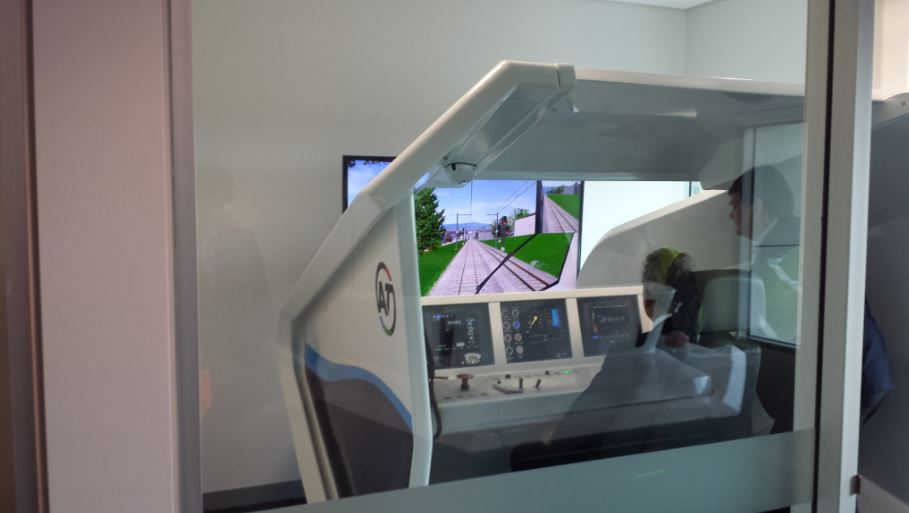
One of the simulators used for training drivers.

Next to the maintenance hall is a two-storey office building. The ground floor houses staff responsible for maintaining the trains. The first floor has offices, and an amenity block for train crews.

A training room houses two train simulators for training drivers, manufactured by Lander Simulation and Training Solution S.A. based in Spain.

The depot control office is located at the south end of the office building. The depot is locally managed using a Tracsis control panel which interfaces to the KiwiRail national control centre in Wellington.

== History ==
The depot was built on the site of a former quarry by a joint venture between Dominion Constructors and Downer Group. The 4.4 hectare site was selected as the best option being large enough to house all the facilities required and adjacent to the railway as required for access purposes. Earthworks preparing the site started in January 2011. This involved filling an area approximately 580m long, 85m wide and 6–11 metres deep in places. Construction of the building and stabling areas commenced in May 2012.

It was officially opened by Ngaire Lasika representing the Māori King Tūheitia, Auckland mayor Len Brown, and Auckland Transport chair Lester Levy on 5 July 2013. The first of 57 three-car New Zealand AM class electric multiple unit trainsets was unveiled by the mayor at the new depot on 12 September 2013. Prime minister John Key attended a ceremony at the depot on 13 August 2015 to mark the delivery of the final trainset.

The depot initially had 6 kilometres of sidings, seven maintenance bays, and provided stabling capacity for up to 28 trains. Additional stabling for the new electric trains was provided at Henderson, Strand Junction, and Papakura.

In 2024, ahead of the opening of the City Rail Link, an order for 23 additional AM Class EMUs was placed, expanding the fleet from 72 to 95 units. The 95th and final unit arrived in Auckland in February 2026. To accommodate the new trains, the depot was expanded with 10 additional stabling roads, along with extra charging stations and maintenance bays.

== See also ==
- Newmarket Workshops, constructed in 1875, replaced by Otahuhu Workshops in 1929.
- Otahuhu Workshops, closed in 1992 when North Island engineering services were consolidated at Hutt Workshops.
- Hutt Workshops, opened in 1930.
