= Edward Tyer =

English railway engineer

Edward Tyer (6 February 1830 - 25 December 1912) was an English railway engineer who developed the Tyer's Electric Train Tablet system widely used in the 19th and 20th centuries on single-track railways. He devised it after the Thorpe rail accident of 1874, which left 21 people dead.

He was also an astronomer.

== See also ==
- "Obituary: Edward Tyer". Minutes of the Proceedings of the Institution of Civil Engineers. 195 (1914). Institution of Civil Engineers: 379. 1914. doi:10.1680/imotp.1914.16820.
