= Manukau Branch =

Railway line in Auckland, New Zealand

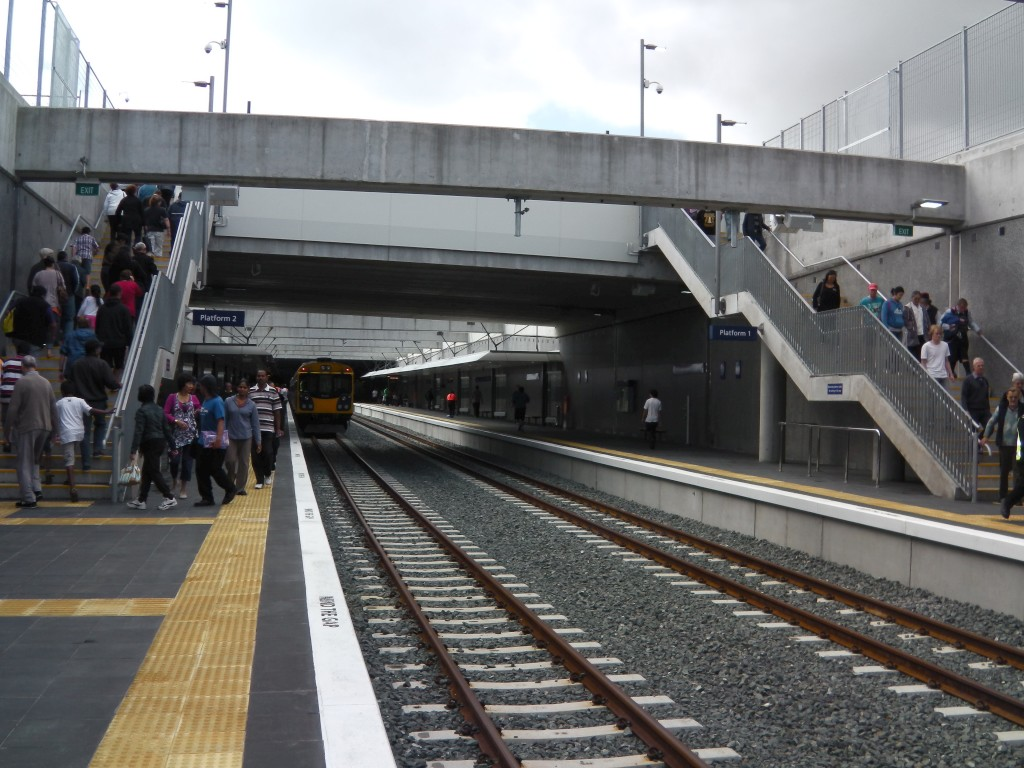
- The trenched approach to Manukau station, the terminus, seen from the west.

Overview
- Status: Open
- Owner: KiwiRail (track and platforms); Auckland Transport (buildings)
- Termini: Wiri; Manukau
- Stations: 1

Service
- Type: Urban rail
- Services: East West Line
- Operator: Auckland One Rail
- Rolling stock: AM class EMU
- Daily ridership: 1,650 (April 2018)

History
- Opened: 15 April 2012

Technical
- Line length: 2.5 kilometres (1.6 mi)
- Track length: 2.5
- Num of tracks: Two
- Character: Urban
- Track gauge: 1,067 mm (3 ft 6 in)
- Electrification: 25 kV AC 2014

Map

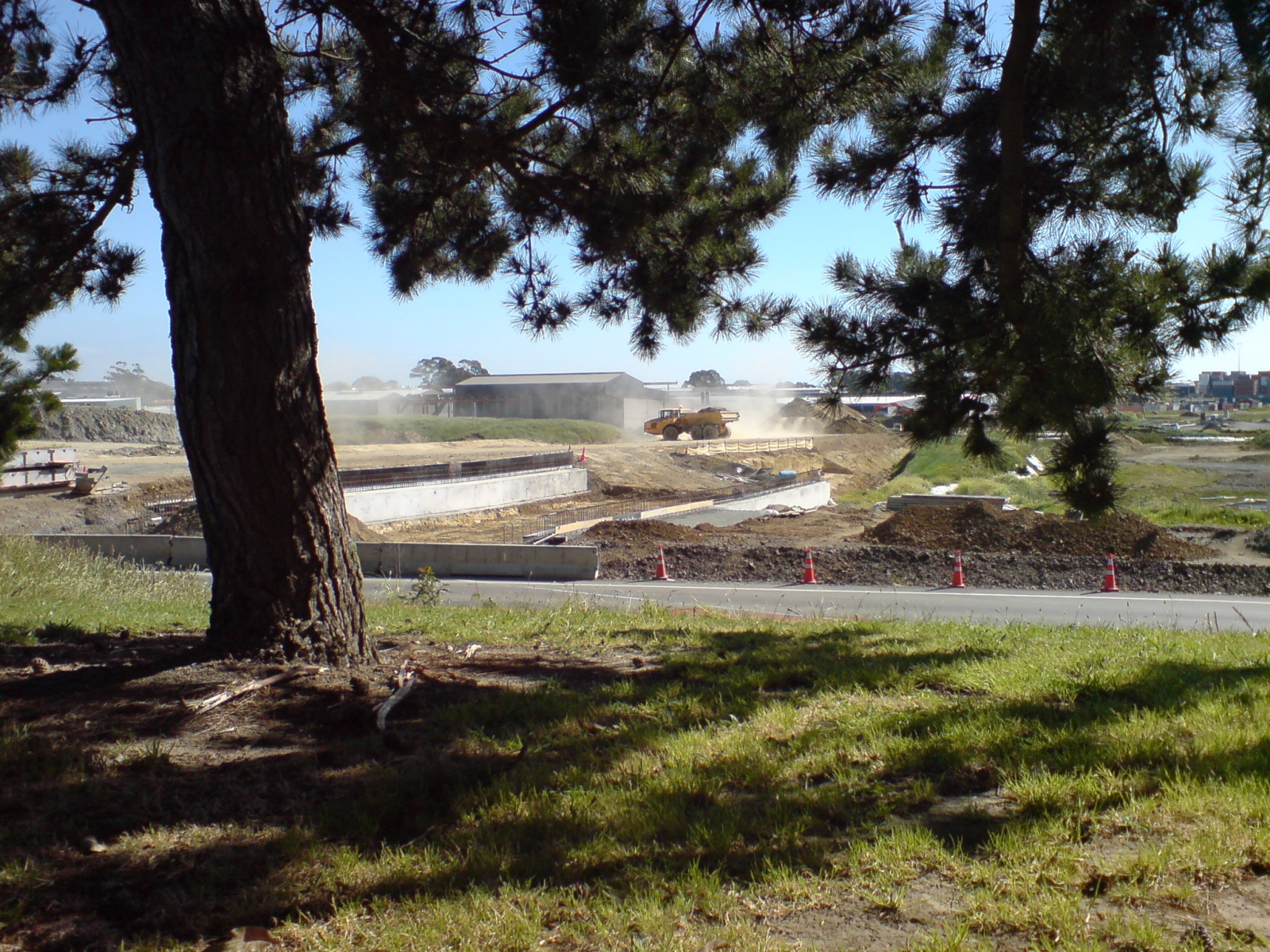
Enabling works for the future rail line as part of the SH20 project in 2008. Looking west over Lambie Drive from just northwest of the future terminus station.

The Manukau Branch is a 2.5 kilometres (1.6 mi) spur railway line off the North Island Main Trunk railway from Wiri to Manukau City Centre in Auckland, New Zealand. It is the first fully new section of railway line constructed in Auckland since the Westfield Deviation in 1930. From Manukau, the branch connects to the NIMT in the north facing direction only.

The estimated cost of the project was $50 million. Construction began in June 2009 and the line opened on 15 April 2012.

== Route ==
The branch leaves the NIMT south of Puhinui station and slightly north of the closed Wiri station. It runs on both New Zealand Railways Corporation and Auckland Council land. The NZ Transport Agency built some of the branch's earthworks. The extension of State Highway 20 to State Highway 1 included provision for the route.

=== Southern link ===
Following the opening of the branch, Auckland mayor Len Brown called for the completion of its south facing link to the North Island Main Trunk. The earthwork formation (constructed by NZTA at a cost of approximately $25 million) for such a link is in place, but tracks need to be laid for it at a cost of approximately $1 million, and another $4–5 million would be required to reconfigure the Ports of Auckland/KiwiRail sidings which were built to a design that conflicts with the proposed southern link.

== Station ==
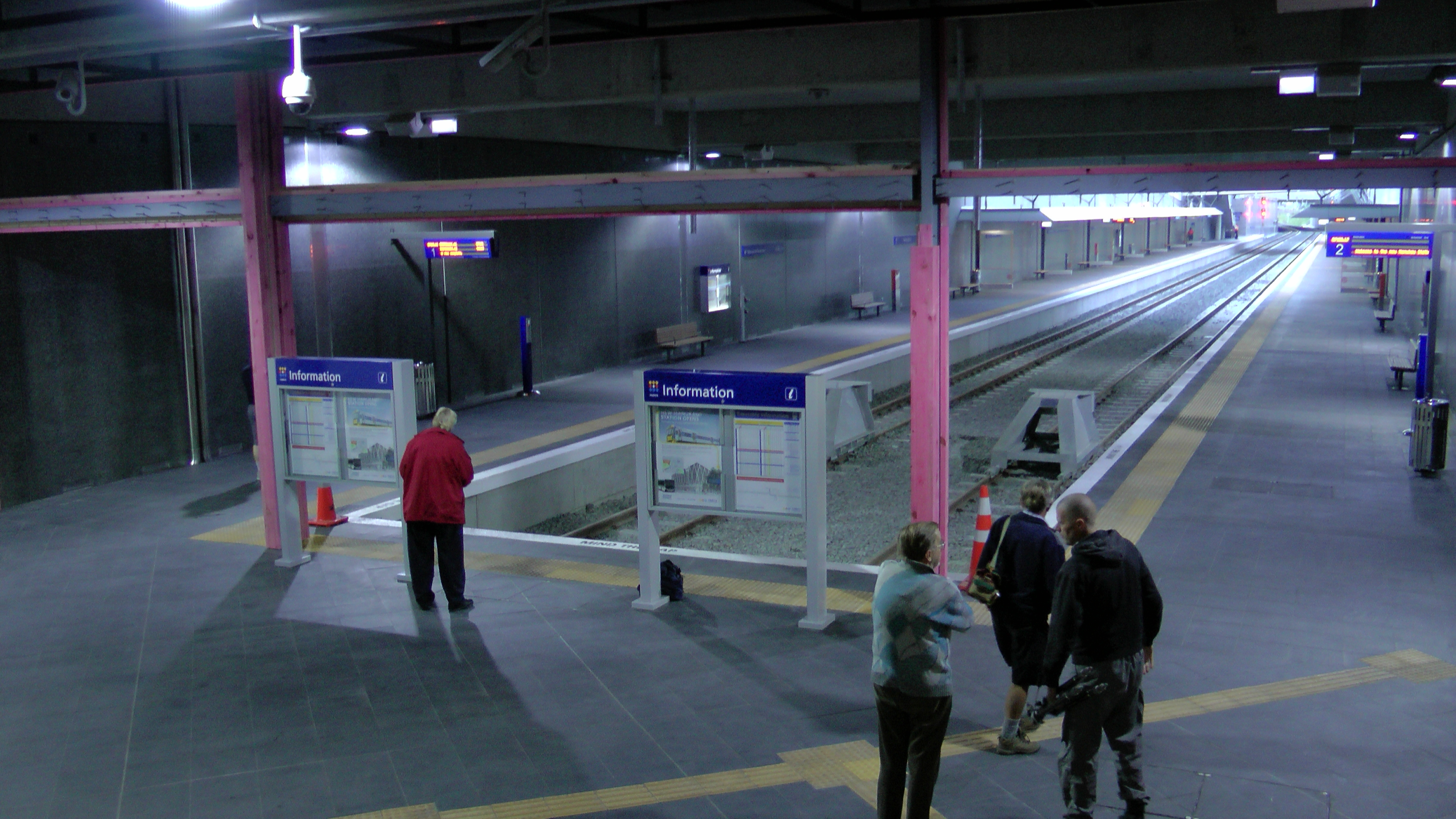
Manukau Station on the first day of services.

The branch has one railway station, Manukau train station, the terminus in Manukau City Centre. The station is intended to move more people into Manukau Central, an area identified by council as a future metropolitan centre.

The station is in (and accessed via) a 300 metres (980 ft) long trench, similar to the New Lynn station, to ease passage under nearby roads. A total of 47,000m^{2} of earth had been excavated when earthworks finished in May 2010.

The station is located at the heart of a campus for the Manukau Institute of Technology, being below ground level with the campus building constructed above it.

== History ==
On 21 November 1986, Mayor of Manukau City, Barry Curtis, announced plans to establish a mini-monorail system at Manukau City Centre ahead of the 1990 Commonwealth Games, with a later extension to the main railway line at Wiri. The plans were eventually abandoned.

The Manukau rail link was part of the $600m DART (Developing Auckland’s Rail Transport) project, which started in 2005.

Construction of the extension of the Southwestern Motorway to connect with the Southern Motorway at Manukau began in June 2006. This included preparatory work towards the construction of the rail line. Construction of the rail line began in June 2009 with completion expected in late 2011. However, due to other work on the Auckland network taking priority, completion was rescheduled for April 2012. Station works were reported essentially finished by October 2011, and the line opened on 15 April 2012.

The branch opened on 15 April 2012. After several months in operation, during June 2012 daily usage levels were around 500 to 600 passengers. In April 2018, Manukau was the 11th busiest train station on the Auckland network with an average of 1,650 passengers on a typical weekday.

On 7 April 2018, a 23-bay bus station was opened on a lot adjacent to the train station to create a transport hub serving most of the southern Auckland Region. Services from the facility began the following day.

== See also ==
- North Island Main Trunk
- North Auckland Line
- Newmarket Line
- Onehunga Branch
- Riverhead Branch
- Waiuku/Mission Bush Branch
- List of Auckland railway stations
