= Papatoetoe Railway Station Preservation Trust =

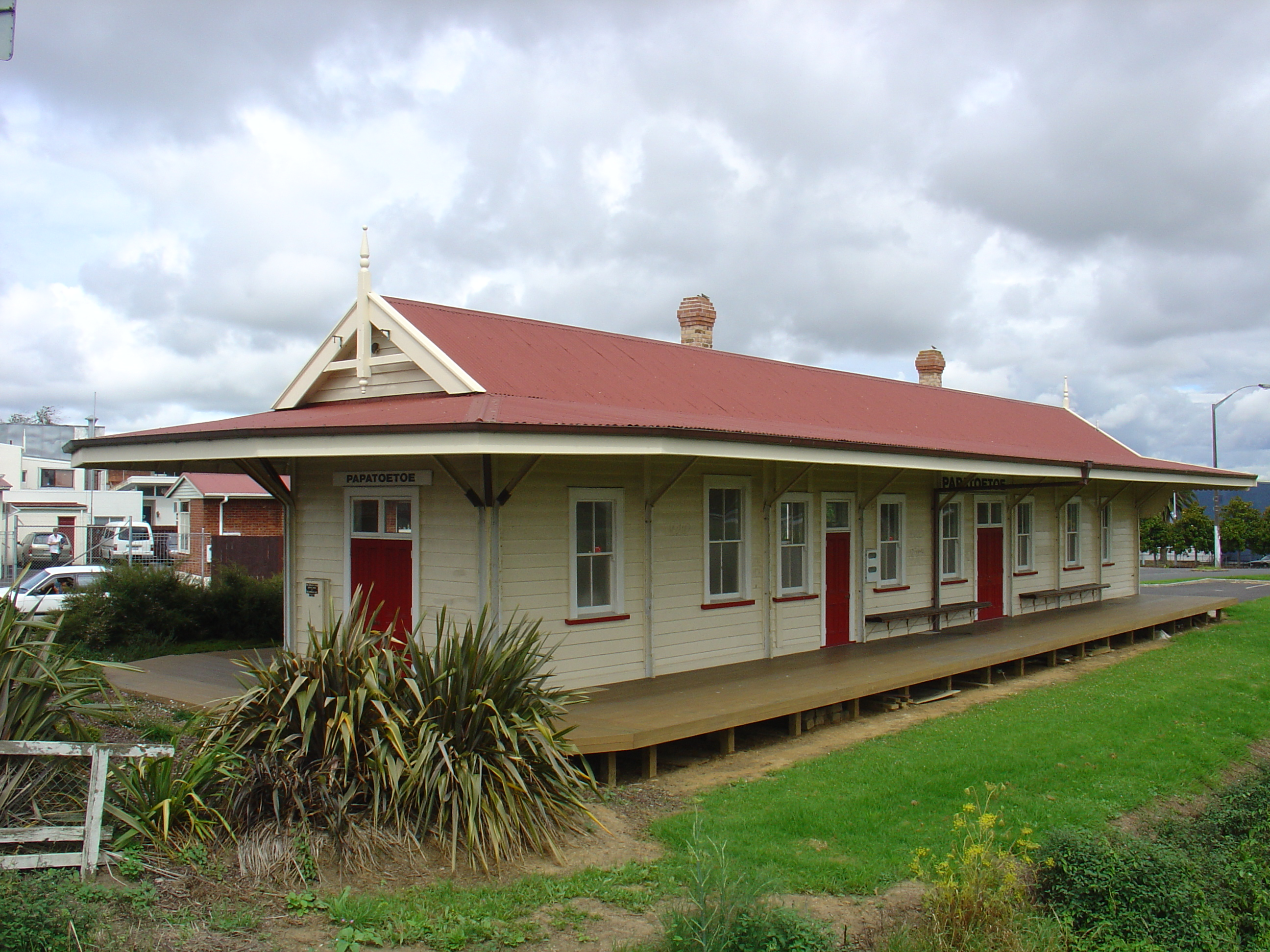
Papatoetoe's old Railway Station - a local landmark

The Papatoetoe Railway Station Preservation Trust, (New Zealand), was formed after a public meeting in 1996 to restore Papatoetoe station building, parts of which date back to 1875, which was facing demolition.

On 13 December 1999 the Trust moved the building a few hundred metres south, still adjacent to the North Island Main Trunk, and the site of the original station master's house. Before the move, chimneys and fireplaces were dismantled and paint stripped from the bricks and the cast concrete fireplaces.

Completely restored, the building is a community building for classes, gatherings and meetings, made possible by community effort and private donations, with funding from the ASB Trust, New Zealand Lottery Grants Board, Manukau City Council, Papatoetoe Licensing Trust, Shooters Snooker and Pool, and the Rail Heritage Trust of New Zealand.

== See also ==
- Papatoetoe Train Station
- List of Auckland railway stations
