= Harania Creek =

Waterway in Auckland, New Zealand

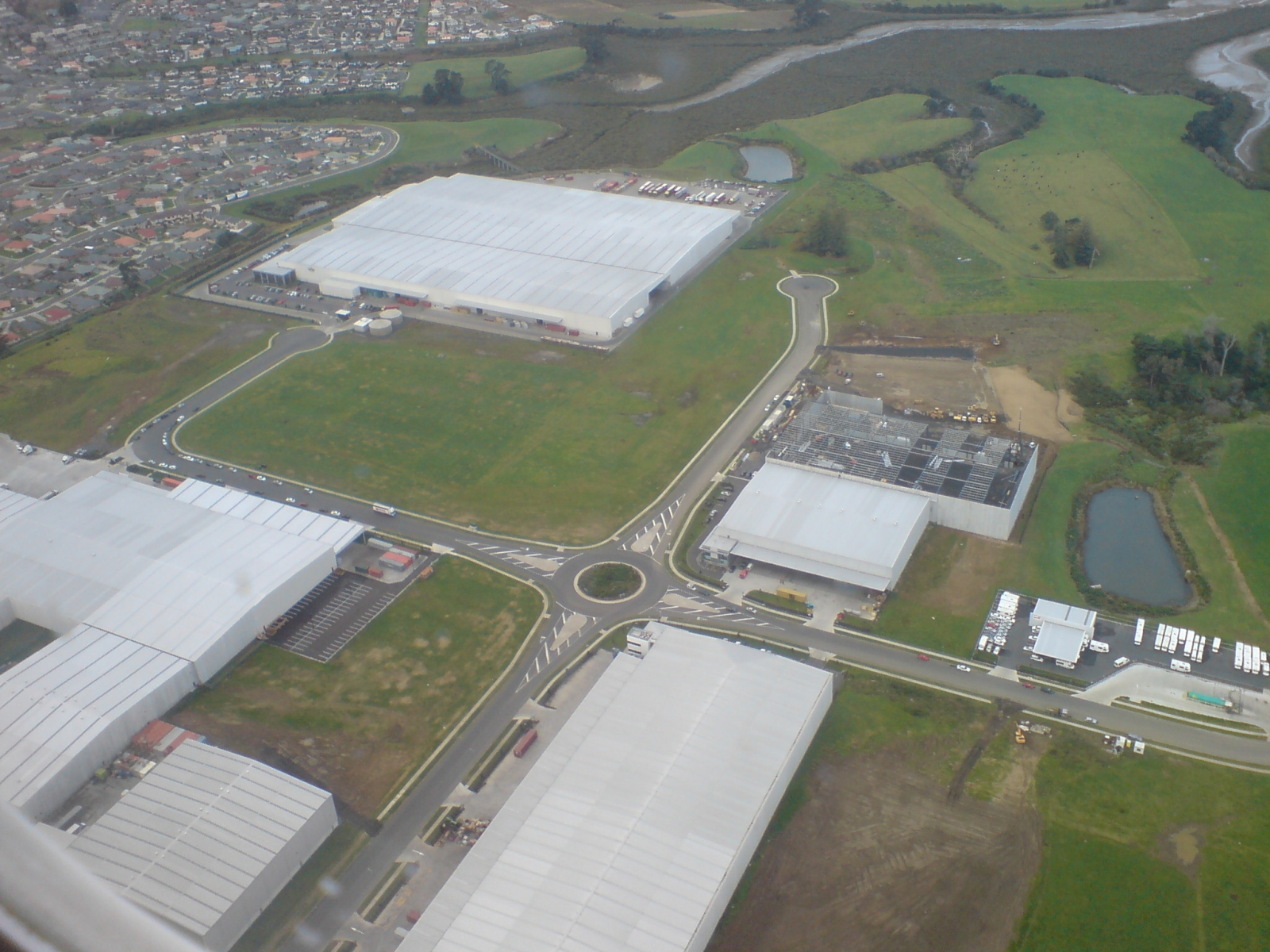
- An aerial view of the Harania Creek in 2008

- Mouth of the Harania Creek Harania Creek (New Zealand)
- Route of the Harania Creek

Location
- Country: New Zealand
- Region: Auckland Region

Physical characteristics
- Source
  - location: Māngere East
  - coordinates: 36.95856°S 174.81663°E
- Mouth: Māngere Inlet
  - coordinates: 36.9461°S 174.8193°E

Basin features
- Progression: Harania Creek → Māngere Inlet → Manukau Harbour

Harania Creek is the name of the shallow estuarine waterway in the Māngere Inlet on the Manukau Harbour, Auckland, New Zealand. The area extends from 1,500 metres (4,900 ft) east of the Māngere Bridge when the tide is fully out, for 1 kilometre to the end of the harbour in the heart of Māngere.

The waterway system is fed by a number of small open and piped creeks which bring runoff from residential, industrial and park areas in Ōtāhuhu, Māngere East, and Favona. The largest of these fresh water runoffs is the Māngere East catchment which emerges from behind the Pacific Steel reclamation.

The creek is bound by mangroves in its upper reaches. These mangroves emerged from approximately 1970s onwards, following the end of significant emissions from several large slaughterhouses. The mangrove roots create a tight course for the creek, which has deepened over time.

The area has been the subject of study into the geomorphology of fresh water flowing through a tidal system by the Auckland University Geology Department. This looked at changing sea levels over time.

The Norana Esplanade Walkway opened in 2020 and crosses the Harania Creek estuary and its associated mangroves.
