= South Auckland =

Region of Auckland, New Zealand

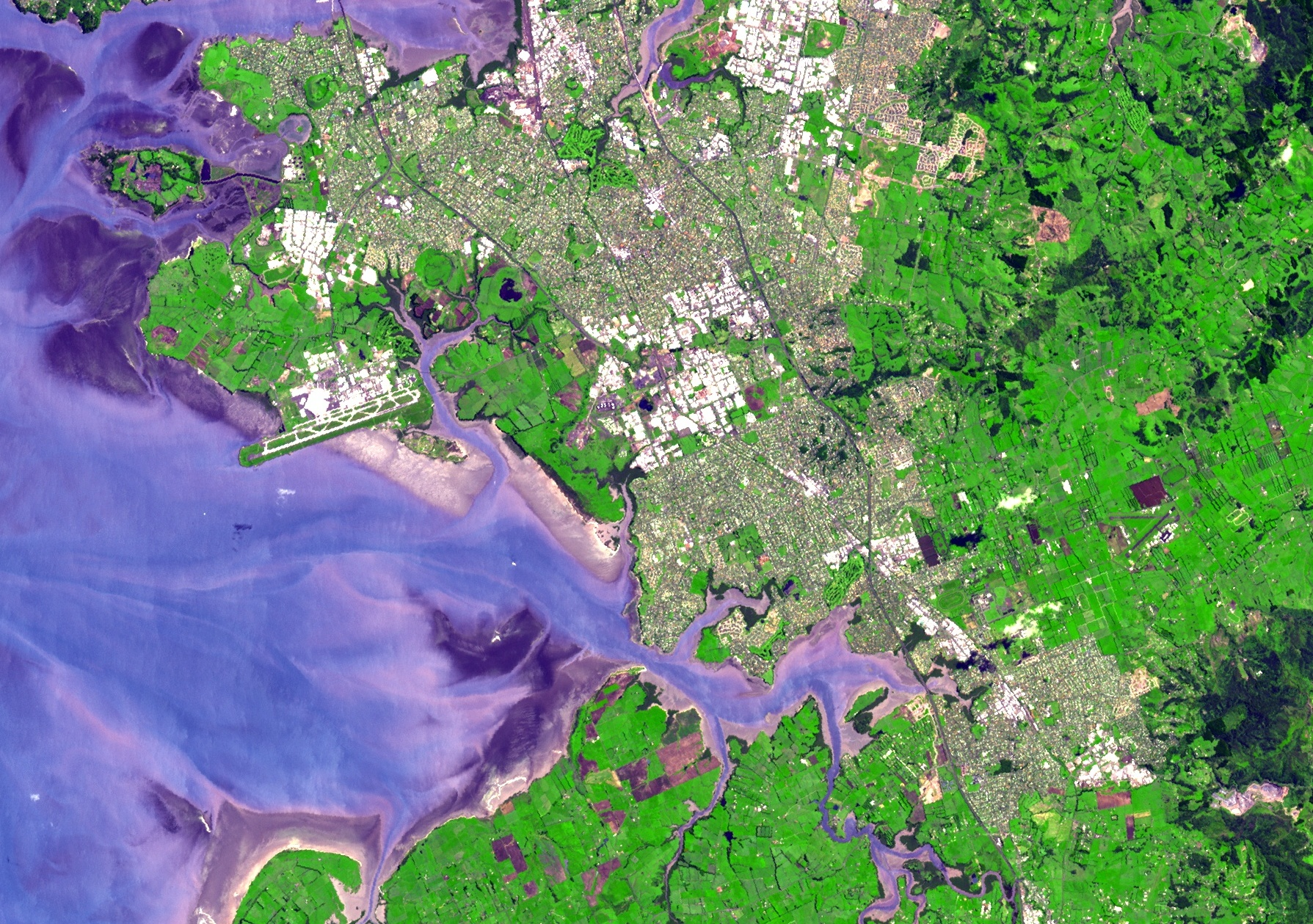
- A satellite view of South Auckland in 2006

- Location in the Auckland Region
- Coordinates: 36°59′S 174°52′E
- Country: New Zealand
- Island: North Island
- Region: Auckland Region
- NZ Parliament: Mangere; Manurewa; Panmure-Ōtāhuhu; Papakura; Takanini

Government
  - MPs: Judith Collins (National); Rima Nakhle (National); Jenny Salesa (Labour); Lemauga Lydia Sosene (Labour); Arena Williams (Labour)

Area
  - Total: 166.94 km^{2} (64.46 sq mi)

Population (June 2025)
  - Total: 379,400
  - Density: 2,273/km^{2} (5,886/sq mi)

South Auckland (Māori: Te Tonga o Tāmaki Makaurau or Māori: Tāmaki ki te Tonga) is one of the major geographical regions of Auckland, the largest city in New Zealand. The area is south of the Auckland isthmus, and on the eastern shores of the Manukau Harbour. The area has been populated by Tāmaki Māori since at least the 14th century, and has important archaeological sites, such as the Ōtuataua stonefield gardens at Ihumātao, and Māngere Mountain, a former pā site important to Waiohua tribes.

The area was primarily farmland until the mid-20th century, when the construction of the Auckland Southern Motorway led to major suburban development, and the establishing of Manukau City, which was later amalgamated into Auckland. Large-scale state housing areas were constructed in the 1960s and 1970s, which led to significant Urban Māori and Pasifika communities developing in the area. The presence of 165 different ethnicities makes South Auckland one of the most diverse places in New Zealand. It is Auckland's most socio-economically deprived area.

== Definition ==
South Auckland is not a strictly defined area. It primarily refers to the western and central parts of the former Manukau City, which existed between 1989 and 2010, and surrounding areas of Franklin. Major areas of South Auckland include Māngere, Manukau, Manurewa, Ōtāhuhu, Ōtara, Papakura and Papatoetoe. A strict definition sometimes used for South Auckland includes just the Māngere-Ōtāhuhu, Manurewa, Ōtara-Papatoetoe, Papakura local board areas.

The term South Auckland was first used in the 1880s, to refer to areas of the southern Auckland Province, such as Cambridge, Ngāruawāhia, Te Awamutu, or Hamilton. The first references to modern South Auckland come from 1962, in discussions for the creation of Manukau City. The term began developing negative connotations in the 1970s, with non-residents associating the term with deprivation, crime and violence. From 1989, many organisations began using the term Counties Manukau as an alternative way to describe South Auckland.

The name South Auckland is often used imprecisely by the press or politicians, to describe lower socio-economic areas south of the Auckland City Centre. Some areas of the Auckland isthmus occasionally referred to as South Auckland are Onehunga, Penrose, Mount Wellington, and Panmure. Some Howick ward suburbs to the East often get confused by being called South Auckland, including Flat Bush and East Tāmaki. Towns south of Auckland are also often referred to as South Auckland, including Pukekohe and Waiuku, and occasionally some towns in the northern Waikato Region, such as Pōkeno and Tuakau.

== Natural history ==
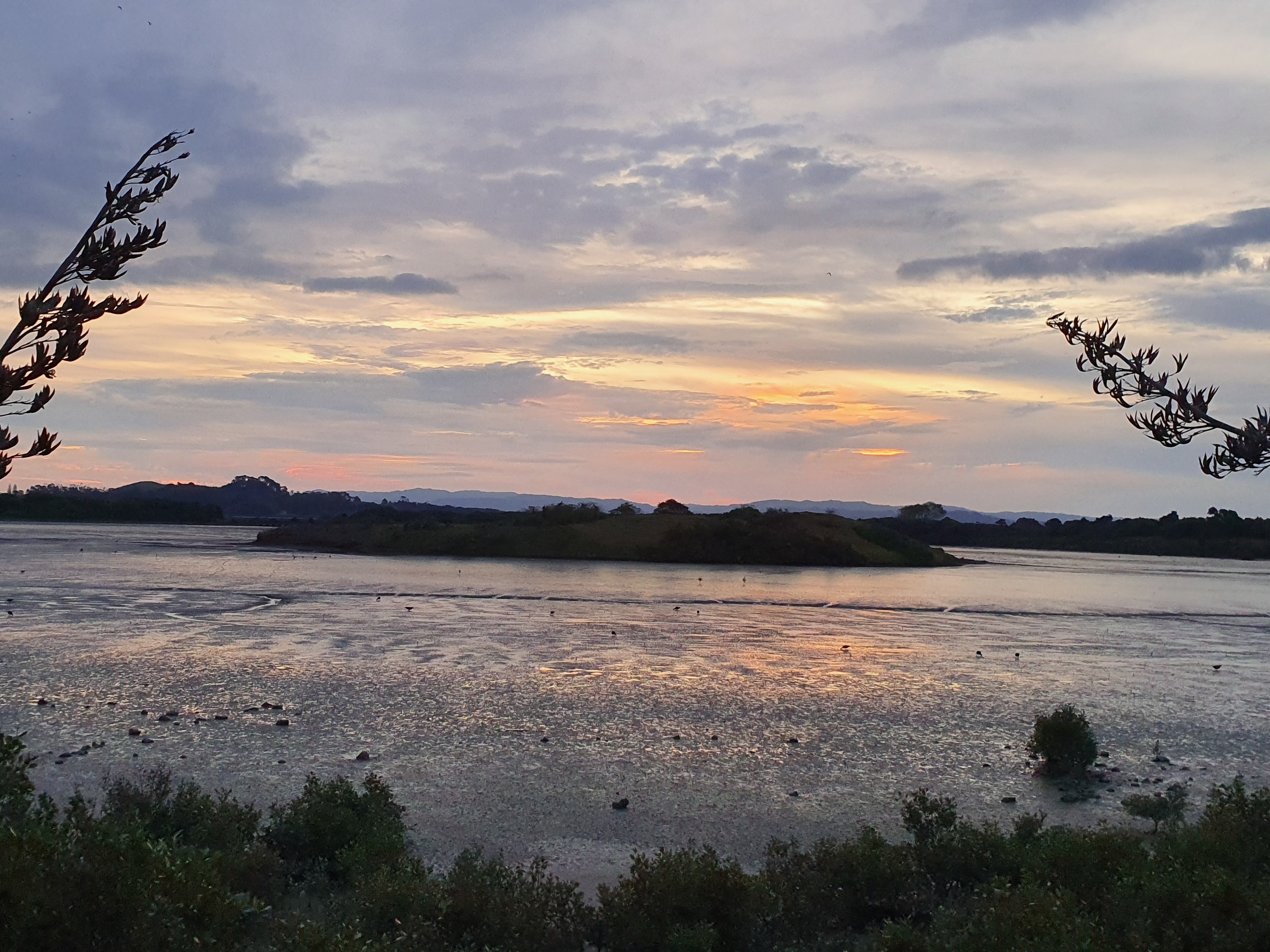
South Auckland is home to many volcanic maars along the coast of the Manukau Harbour, such as Māngere Lagoon

South Auckland is an area on the eastern shores of the Manukau Harbour, and the upper headwaters of the Tāmaki River. Many features of the Auckland volcanic field are found in South Auckland, such as Māngere Mountain, Matukutūreia and the Pukaki Lagoon. Many of the mountains of South Auckland have been quarried, such as Matukutūruru, Maungataketake and Ōtara Hill (either entirely or partially). Some of the northern-most features of the older South Auckland volcanic field can be found in the area, such as Pukekiwiriki and the Hūnua Falls.

Both the Manukau Harbour and the Tāmaki River are drowned river valley systems. The Manukau Harbour formed between 3 and 5 million years ago when tectonic forces between the Pacific Plate and Australian Plate uplifted the Waitākere Ranges and subsided the Manukau Harbour. It began as an open bay, eventually forming as a sheltered harbour as the Āwhitu Peninsula developed at the harbour's mouth. Over the last two million years, the harbour has cycled between periods of being a forested river valley and a flooded harbour, depending on changes in the global sea level. The present harbour formed approximately 8,000 years ago, after the Last Glacial Maximum.

Historically, much of inland South Auckland was composed of wetlands. Many areas of remnant native bush are found in South Auckland, such as the taraire forest at Kirk's Bush in Papakura, and areas of the Auckland Botanic Gardens in Manurewa.

== History ==
=== Early Māori history ===
Known pā and kāinga sites around South Auckland
1 Ōtāhuhu / Mount Richmond
2 Green Hill (Matanginui)
3 Ōtara Hill
4 Māngere Mountain
5 Puketutu Island
6 Waitomokia
7 Oruarangi
8 Ihumātao
9 Maungataketake
10 Pūkaki
11 Papahīnau
12 Te Pā-o-te-tū-tahi-atu
13 Matukutūruru
14 Matukutūreia
15 Takirangaranga
16 Te Aparangi
17 Pukekiwiriki

The Auckland area was an early location visited by many of the Māori migration canoes, including the Matahourua, Aotea, Mātaatua, Tainui, Tākitimu, Tokomaru, Te Wakatūwhenua and Moekākara waka. Some of the earliest stories about the region involve Te Tō Waka, the portage at Ōtāhuhu, that allowed waka to cross between the east coast and the Manukau Harbour, where only 200 metres of land separated the two. The crossing of the Tainui waka is memorialised in the name of Ngarango Otainui Island in the Māngere Inlet, where the wooden skids used to haul the waka were left after the trip was made, and other waka including the Matahourua, Aotea, Mātaatua and Tokomaru all have traditional stories associated with the portage.

Portages remained important features Tāmaki Māori. In South Auckland, the Waokauri and Pūkaki portages at Papatoetoe was used to avoid Te Tō Waka, controlled by the people who lived at Ōtāhuhu / Mount Richmond. The Papakura portage connected the Manukau Harbour at Papakura in the west to the Wairoa River in the east, likely along the path of the Old Wairoa Road, and Te Pai o Kaiwaka at Waiuku connected the Manukau Harbour to the Waikato River in the south.

Tāmaki Māori peoples settled the eastern coastline of the Manukau Harbour as early as the 14th century. Settlements in the area were based on what resources were available seasonally, such as Manukau Harbour fish and shellfish.

In the 15th century, Tāmaki Māori people created extensive garden sites at Ihumātao, Wiri and the slopes of Māngere Mountain. These garden sites used Polynesian agricultural techniques and traditions, with the stone walls acting acted as boundaries, windbreaks and drainage systems for the crops grown in the area, which included kūmara (sweet potato), hue (calabash gourds), taro, uwhi (ube yam), tī pore (Pacific cabbage tree) and aute (the paper mulberry tree). The environment-modifying techniques used in the Ōtuataua Stonefields allowed early Tāmaki Māori to propagate crops which were not suited to a cooler climate.

A number of early Tāmaki Māori iwi and hapū are associated with South Auckland. Ngā Oho was used as a unifying name for Tāmaki Māori who descended from the Tainui and Te Arawa migratory waka. Descendants of Tāhuhunui-o-te-rangi, captain of the Moekākara waka, settled around Ōtāhuhu and adopted the name Ngāi Tāhuhu, while descendants of Tāiki, a Tainui ancestor of Ngāi Tai ki Tāmaki, named the Tāmaki River after himself (Te Wai ō Tāiki) and settled on the eastern shores of the river alongside the descendants of Huiārangi (of the early iwi Te Tini ō Maruiwi), including the shores of Te Waiōtara (the Ōtara Creek). Over time, Ngā Riki emerged as a group who settled between Ōtāhuhu and Papakura, and Ngā Oho was used to describe the people who lived around Papakura.

Many of the volcanic features of South Auckland became fortified pā sites for Tāmaki Māori, notably Māngere Mountain, Matukutūruru, Matukutūreia and Pukekiwiriki. There are few pā sites inland from the coasts, due to the flat land being unsuitable for fortified sites. The pā is known by the name Te Pā-o-te-tū-tahi-atu, a name that describes the pā as temporary, due to the surrounding flat landscape not being ideal for fortifications.

In the early 17th century, the area became a part of the rohe of Te Kawerau ā Maki.

=== Waiohua ===
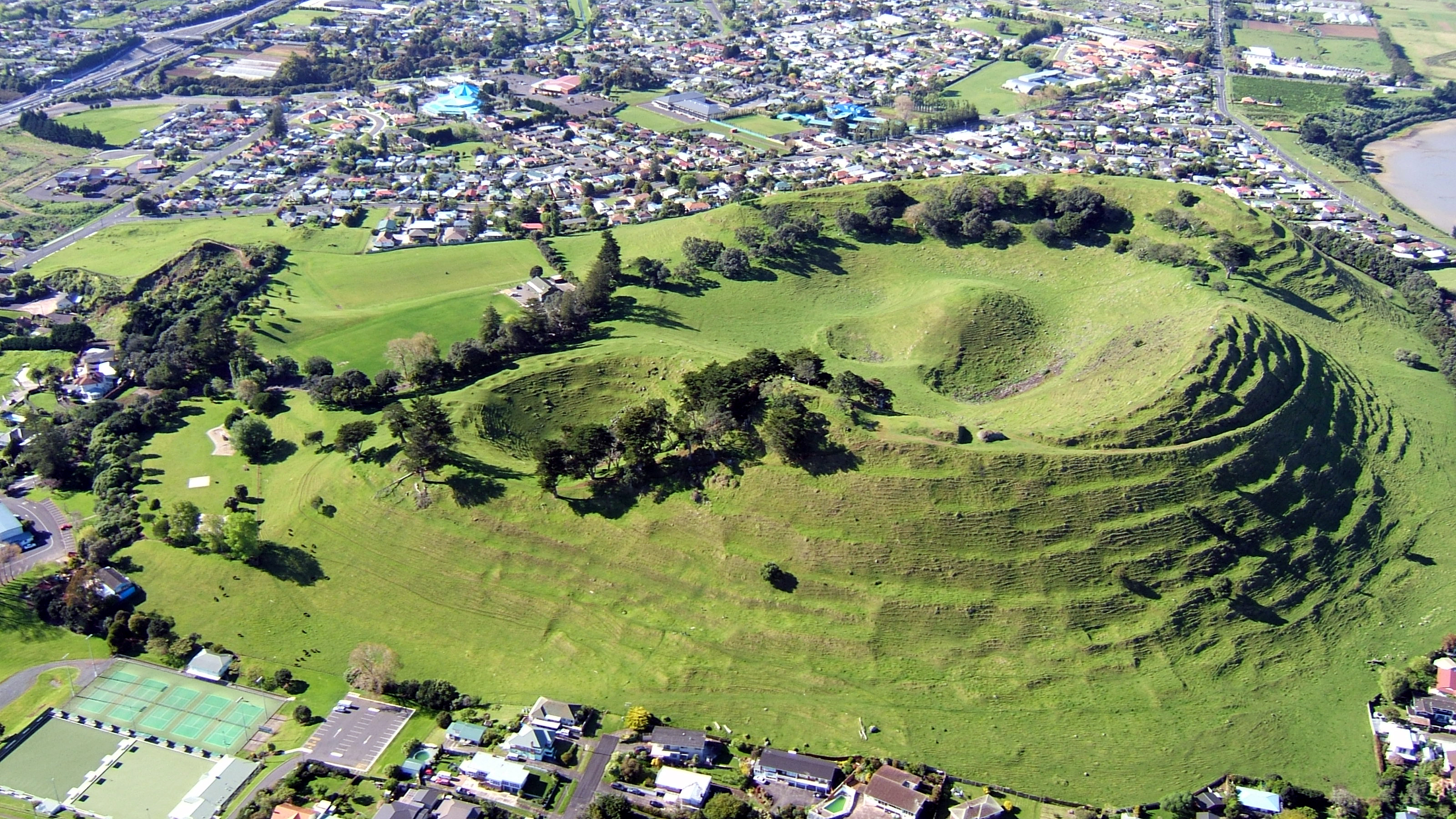
Māngere Mountain / Te Pane-o-Mataaho / Te Ara Pueru was an important pā site for Waiohua and Ngāti Whātua

In the 17th century, three major tribes of Tāmaki Makaurau, Ngā Iwi, Ngā Oho and Ngā Riki, joined to form the Waiohua under the rangatira Huakaiwaka. The union lasted for three generations, and was centred around the pā of Maungawhau and later Maungakiekie on the Auckland isthmus. Other Tāmaki Māori groups such as Ngāi Tāhuhu were considered either allies of Waiohua, or hapū within the union.

Māngere Mountain / Te Pane-o-Mataaho / Te Ara Pueru was a major pā for the Waiohua, a confederacy of Tāmaki Māori iwi. The mountain complex may have been home to thousands of people, with the mountain acting as a central place for rua (food storage pits). Paramount chief Kiwi Tāmaki stayed at Māngere seasonally, when it was the time of year to hunt sharks in the Manukau Harbour. To the south, the twin peaks of Matukutūreia and Matukutūruru were home to the Ngāi Huatau hapū of Waiohua, settled by Huatau, daughter of Huakaiwaka.

Around the year 1740, a conflict between Ngāti Whātua and Waiohua led to the death of paramount chief Kiwi Tāmaki, who became the major occupants of the Tāmaki isthmus and Māngere. Ngāti Whātua was significantly smaller than the Waiohua confederation and chose to focus life at Onehunga, Māngere and Ōrākei. Gradually, the Waiohua people who had sought refuge with their Waikato Tainui relatives to the south, re-established in the South Auckland area, mainly in a disbursed circuit around the Manukau Harbour. During this time, the tribal identities of Te Ākitai Waiohua, Ngāti Tamaoho and Ngāti Te Ata Waiohua developed. Ngāti Whātua people who remained in the area and interwed with Waiohua developed into the modern iwi Ngāti Whātua Ōrākei. By the 19th century, most Tāmaki Māori peoples moved away from fortified pā and favoured kāinga closer to resources and transport routes.

In the 1820s, the threat of Ngāpuhi war parties from the north during the Musket Wars caused most of the Tāmaki Makaurau area to become deserted. Ngāti Whatua and Waiohua relocated to the Waikato under the protection of Pōtatau Te Wherowhero. A peace accord between Ngāpuhi and Waikato Tainui was reached through the marriage of Matire Toha, daughter of Ngāpuhi chief Rewa was married to Kati Takiwaru, the younger brother of Tainui chief Pōtatau Te Wherowhero, who settled together on the slopes of Māngere Mountain. Ngāti Whātua returned to the Māngere-Onehunga area by the mid-1830s, re-establishing a pā on Māngere Mountain called Whakarongo. During the 1840s, Waiohua descendant tribes returned to their papakāinga (settlements) at Ihumātao, Pūkaki, Papahīnau, Waimāhia and Te Aparangi. Māngere-Onehunga was the main residence of Auckland-based Ngāti Whātua until the 1840s.

=== Colonial era ===
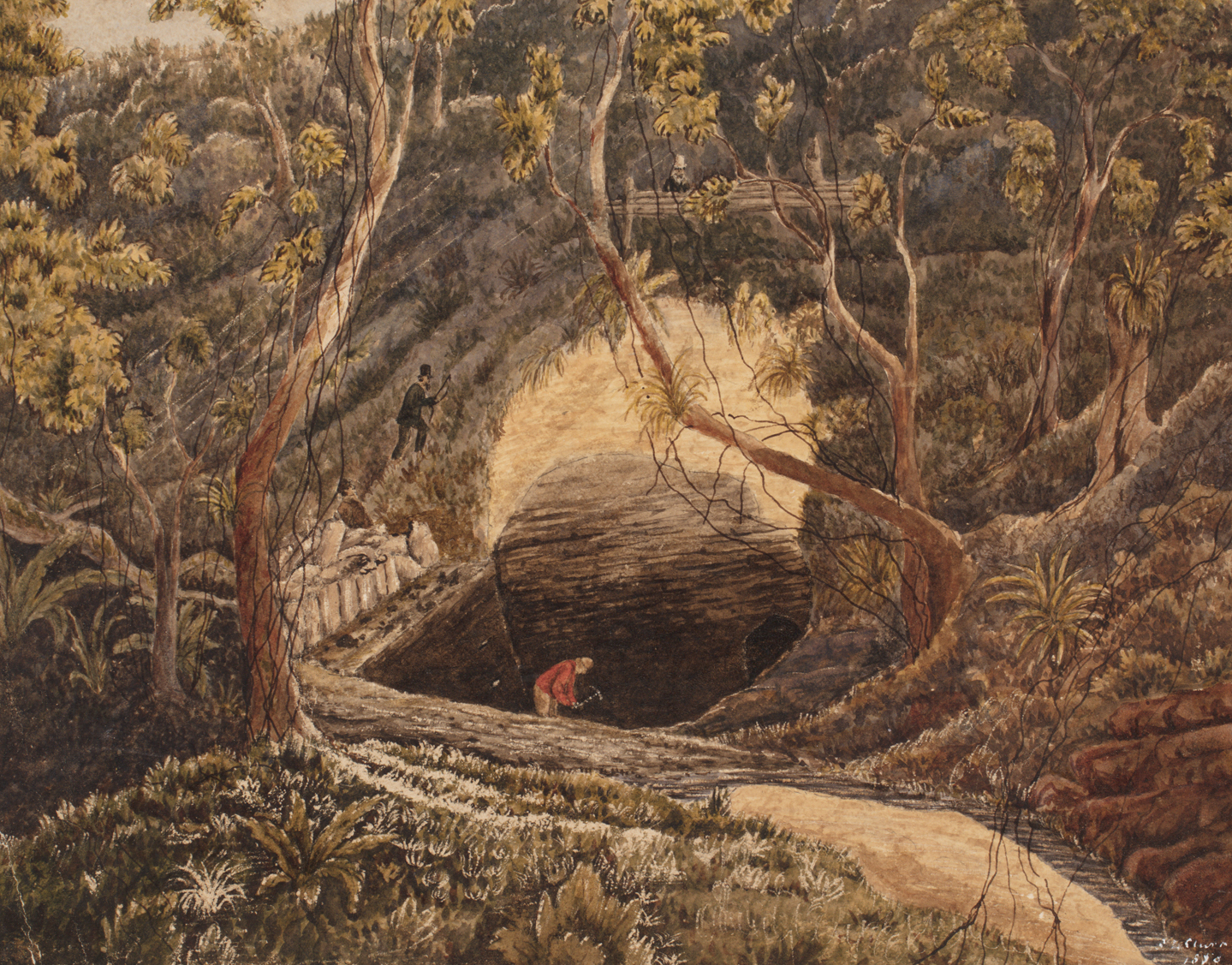
A depiction of the first coal mining at Drury (1850)

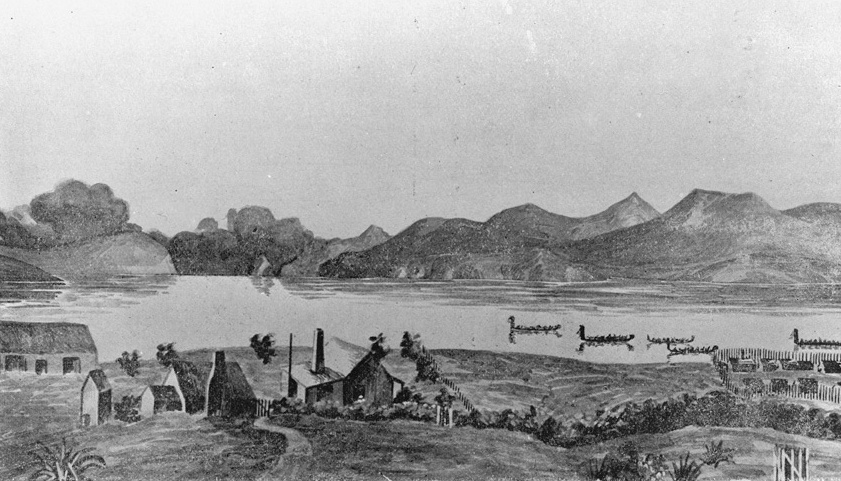
The Wesleyan Mission Station at Ihumātao, near Maungataketake (1855)

In January 1836 missionary William Thomas Fairburn brokered a land sale between Tāmaki Māori chiefs, Pōtatau Te Wherowhero and Turia of Ngāti Te Rau, covering the majority of modern-day South Auckland between Ōtāhuhu and Papakura. The sale was envisioned as a way to end hostilities in the area, but it is unclear what the chiefs understood or consented to. Māori continued to live in South Auckland, unchanged by this sale. The Fairburn Purchase was criticised for the sheer size of the purchase, and in 1842 the Crown significantly reduced the size of his land holdings, and the Crown partitioned much of the land for European settlers.

On 20 March 1840, Ngāti Whātua chief Apihai Te Kawau signed the Treaty of Waitangi at Ōrua Bay on the Manukau Harbour, inviting Lieutenant-Governor William Hobson to settle in Auckland, hoping this would protect the land and people living in Tāmaki Makaurau. In the winter of 1840, Ngāti Whātua moved the majority of the iwi to the Waitematā Harbour, with most iwi members resettling to the Remuera-Ōrākei area, closer to the new European settlement at Waihorotiu (modern-day Auckland City Centre). A smaller Ngāti Whātua presence remained at Māngere-Onehunga.

In 1846, the Wesleyan Methodist Church established a mission at the foot of Maungataketake, near Ihumātao. The following year, Governor George Grey established the village of Ōtāhuhu. The village was created as a way to protect the township of Auckland, and was settled by retired British soldiers of the Royal New Zealand Fencible Corps. Grey also asked Pōtatau Te Wherowhero (then known as a powerful chief and negotiator, but later the first Māori King) to settle at Māngere Bridge as a second defensive site, which developed into a Ngāti Mahuta village. Papakura was established in the late 1840s by a small group of settler families.

The South Auckland area flourished in the 1850s, when Manukau Harbour and Waikato tribes produced goods to sell or barter at the port of Onehunga, primarily corn, potato, kūmara, pigs, peaches, melons, fish and potatoes. Ōtāhuhu developed as an agricultural centre and trade hub, with the Tāmaki River becoming one of the busiest waterways in New Zealand by the late 1850s.

In April 1851, the Tāmaki Bridge was constructed along the Great South Road, spurring growth in the Papatoetoe area. By 1855, the Great South Road was extended as far south as Drury. Coal mining became a major industry in Drury during this time, and in 1862 one of the first tramways in New Zealand was constructed to transport coal from the mine to the Manukau Harbour.

==== Invasion of the Waikato ====
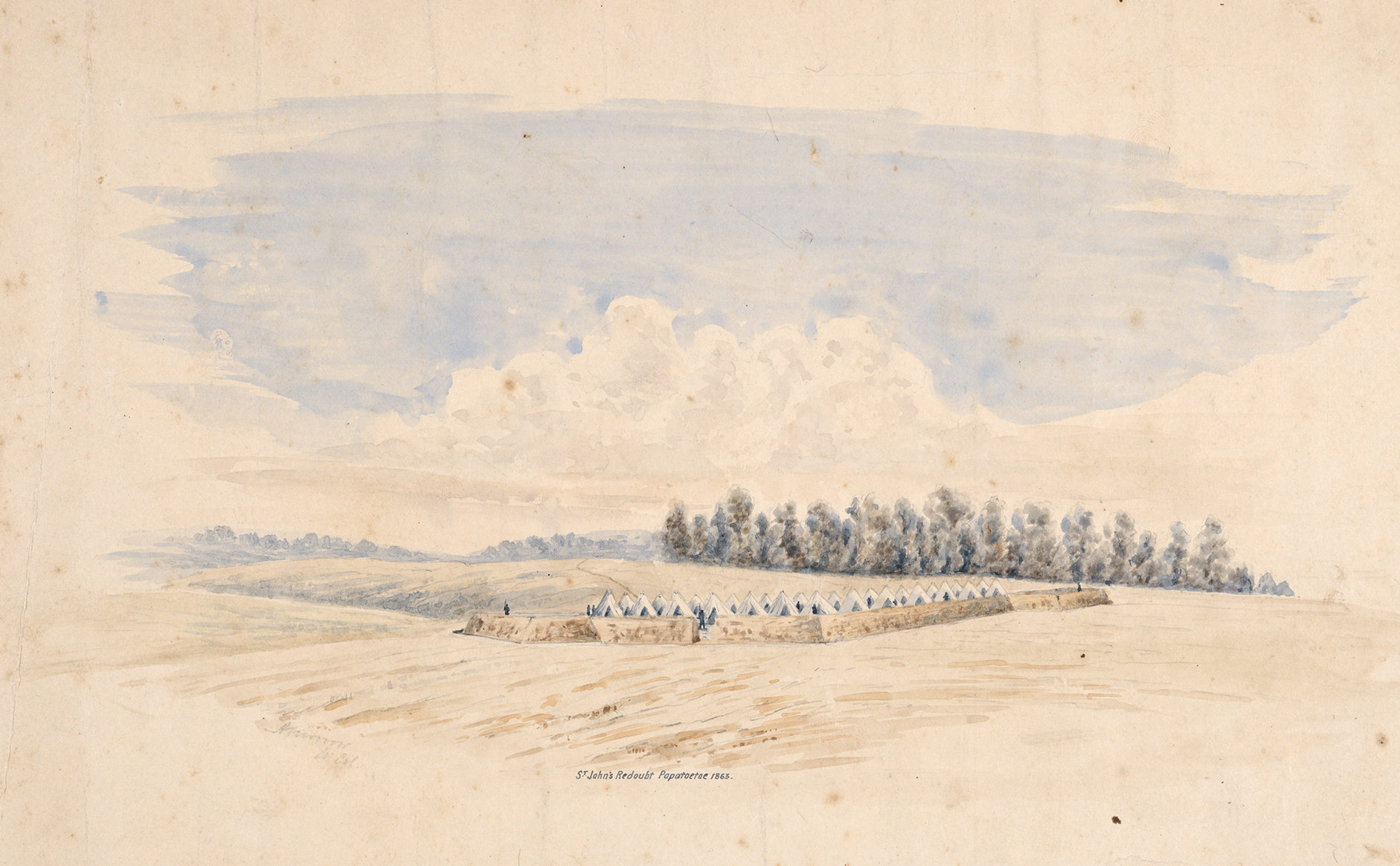
St John's Redoubt in modern Goodwood Heights in 1863

In 1861, Governor George Grey ordered the construction of the Great South Road further into the Waikato, due to fears of potential invasion of Waikato Tainui. On 9 July 1863, due to fears of the Māori King Movement, Governor Grey proclaimed that all Māori living in the South Auckland area needed to swear loyalty to the Queen and give up their weapons. Most people refused due to strong links to Tainui, leaving for the south before the Government's Invasion of the Waikato. Small numbers of people remained, in order to tend to their farms and for ahi kā (land rights through continued occupation). Most Māori occupants of the area felt they had no choice due to their strong ties to Tainui and Pōtatau Te Wherowhero, and were forced to flee to the south. While fleeing, Te Ākitai Waiohua rangatira Ihaka Takanini and his family were captured by his former neighbour, Lieutenant-Colonel Marmaduke Nixon, and taken prisoner on Rakino Island, where Ihaka Takanini died.

During the war, many stockades and redoubts were constructed by the Crown troops. This included St John's Redoubt on Great South Road, constructed in order to secure the supply line for troops and in operation until 1864. Early skirmishes between the Crown and Kīngitanga forces happened in the forested land around Drury and Pukekohe areas, including the Defence of Pukekohe East in September 1863.

After the war, the Crown confiscated 1.2 million acres of Māori land around the Waikato, including Waiohua land in South Auckland. The former residents of the Manukau Harbour began returning to the area in 1866, with the Native Compensation Court returning small portions of land in 1867. Most land was kept by the crown as reserves, or sold on to British immigrant farmers.

=== Farming communities ===
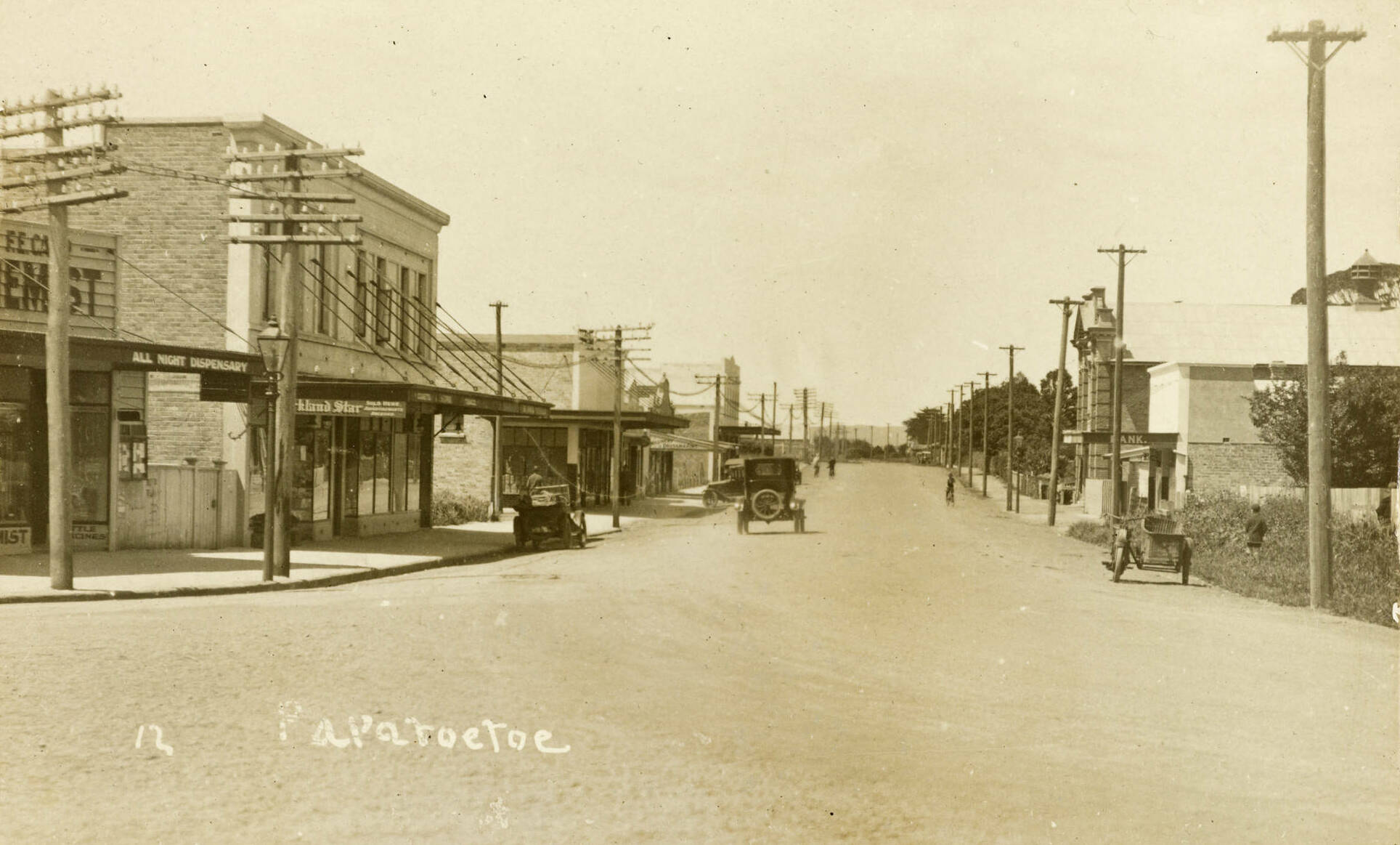
In the early 20th century, South Auckland was primarily made up of small rural communities, such as Papatoetoe (pictured circa 1925)

Small farming communities such as began developing in the area in the latter 19th century along the Great South Road corridor. In 1875, the North Island Main Trunk began operating in South Auckland, linking the South Auckland area to Auckland and the Waikato by train, and leading to development along this corridor. The first Māngere Bridge was opened in 1875, linking Māngere to Onehunga. The township of Woodside in modern-day Wiri dwindled in importance after the railway opened, slowly being overtaken by neighbouring Manurewa. Much of South Auckland was known for wheat production, until the 1880s when dairy farming became popular.

The first local governments in the area, were established in the 1860s in order to better fund roading projects. During the 1890s, the wetlands of South Auckland were a major location for kauri gum digging. Papakura township was adjacent to the large Ardmore Gumfield (also known as the Papakura Gumfield), which stretched from Manurewa to Clevedon. By the 1900s, Auckland gumfields and swamps began being converted into farmland and orchards. In 1890, the Māori King, Tāwhiao, had a residence constructed for his family members at Māngere Bridge, where members of the family including Mahuta Tāwhiao, Tumate Mahuta and Tonga Mahuta stayed while attending schools in Auckland.

The first Chinese New Zealanders arrived in South Auckland in the 1910s, Between the 1920s and 1940s, significant portions of South Auckland were used for Chinese-owned and operated market gardens. In 1911, the first controlled powered flight in New Zealand took place in Takanini. The flight took place inside a single paddock within the racecourse of the now-defunct Papakura Racing Club. The flight was piloted by Vivian Walsh and was carried out in a Howard Wright 1910 Biplane, the parts for which were imported from England in 1910 and assembled by members of the Auckland Aeroplane Syndicate.

During the 1920s, Papatoetoe and Manurewa became some of the fastest growing areas of Auckland. These were joined by Māngere East, which developed after the opening of the Otahuhu Railway Workshops in the late 1920s. During World War II, the Papakura Military Camp was established as an important base for the New Zealand Army. Areas of Papatoetoe and Manurewa were used as military camps for the United States Army. Middlemore Hospital opened in 1947, originally intended to be a temporary military hospital.

In the 1950s, Chinese New Zealand gardeners Fay Gock and Joe Gock began cultivating kūmara (sweet potatoes) at their farm beside Pukaki Creek, using plants donated to them by their neighbours at Pūkaki Marae. The Gocks developed a disease-resistant variety of kūmara that became the modern Owairaka Red variety.

=== Suburban development ===
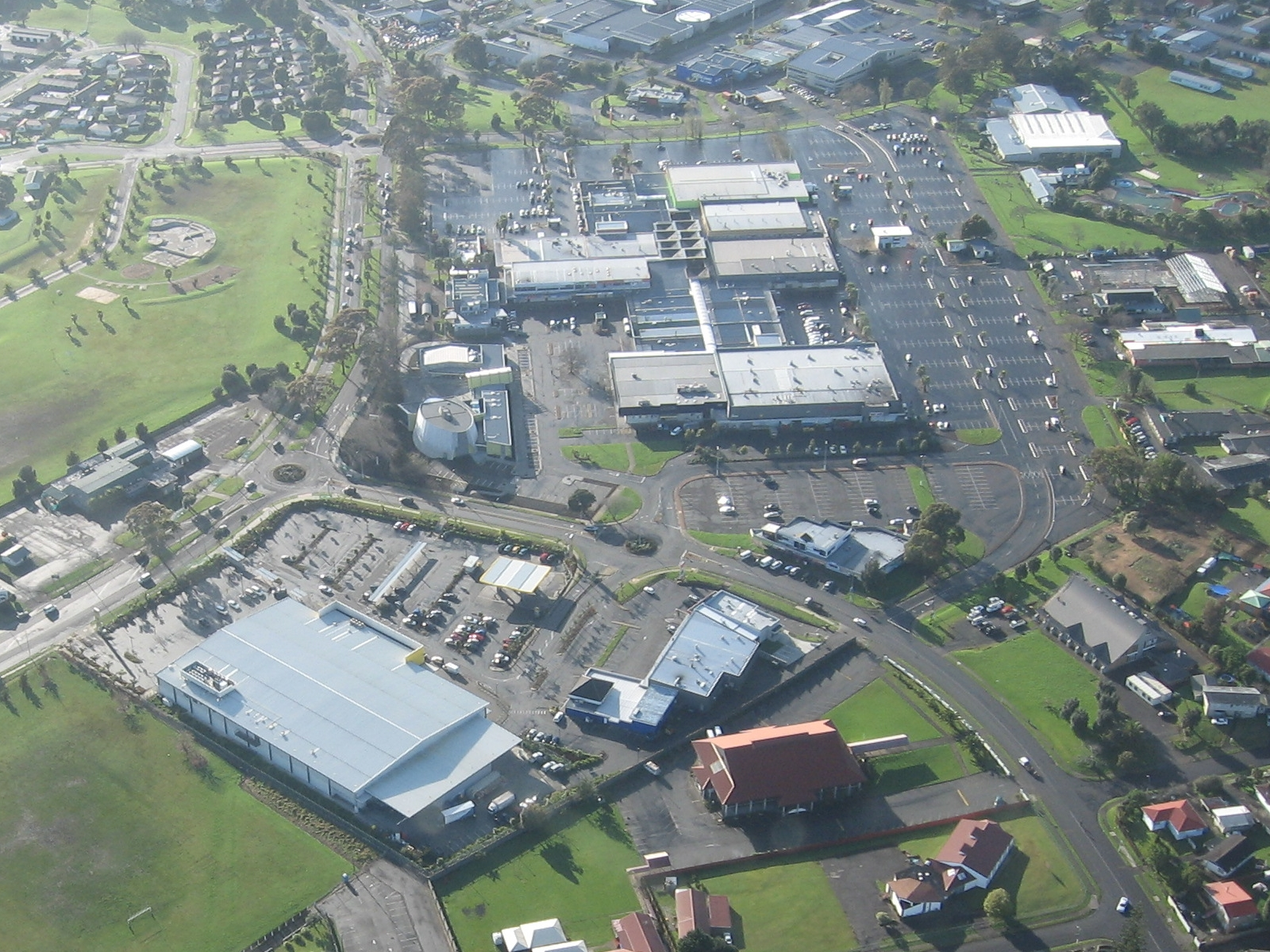
Large-scale state housing projects were undertaken in South Auckland in the 1960s and 1970s, in areas such as Ōtara and Māngere (pictured)

The development of the Auckland Southern Motorway in the mid-1950s led to an explosion in the population of Papatoetoe and Manurewa. In 1958, the first modern supermarket in New Zealand was opened in Papatoetoe, by Tom Ah Chee, Norm Kent and John Brown, and in 1967 the third American-style mall in Auckland was opened, Southmall Manurewa.

In 1960, the Manukau Sewage Purification Works (now Māngere Wastewater Treatment Plant) was opened in the Manukau Harbour, using algae-based oxidation ponds, around Puketutu Island. A new purpose-built Auckland Airport was opened in Māngere 1966 to replace the dual commercial and military airport at Whenuapai. The construction of the airport led to significant reclamation of the Manukau Harbour, and the volcanic scoria of Maungataketake and Puketutu Island was quarried for construction material.

South Auckland's demographics rapidly changed from the 1950s to the 1970s. Between the 1940s and 1960s, Māori living in rural areas were encouraged to move to cities by the Māori Affairs Department, in order to create a larger industrial labour force. Urban Māori populations first settled in the inner suburbs of Auckland and areas close to factories; often areas with poor housing. To counter overcrowding in the central suburbs, the New Zealand Government undertook large scale state housing developments, creating planned suburbs in Ōtara and Māngere in the 1970s, and adding large areas of state housing around Manurewa and Papatoetoe. Large-scale immigration of Pasifika New Zealanders began in the 1950s and 1960s, typically from primarily from Western Samoa (modern-day Samoa), Tonga, the Cook Islands and Niue. By the mid-1970s, gentrification caused many Pasifika communities to relocate away from the central suburbs, moving to areas such as South Auckland.

In 1965, Manukau City was formed by the amalgamation of the Manurewa Borough and Manukau County. The new city decided to create a new commercial and administrative centre, leading to the development of Manukau in a previously rural area between Manurewa and Papatoetoe. After the construction of Manukau, South Auckland from Ōtāhuhu to Papakura became a continuous part of the urban sprawl of Auckland.

In the mid-1970s, construction on State Highway 20 (commonly known as the Southwestern Motorway) began in South Auckland, including a new motorway bridge to be built alongside the existing Māngere Bridge. Construction was halted by May 1978, when workers organised a labour strike over insufficient redundancy payments. The partially constructed bridge was picketed for a period of two and a half years, becoming the longest continuous labour strike in the history of New Zealand. The Auckland Botanic Gardens opened in Manurewa in 1982, the same year as, Rainbow's End a theme park in Manukau. Over time, Rainbow's End expanded to become the largest theme park in New Zealand.

In the 1989 local government reforms, Manukau, Papatoetoe and Howick in East Auckland amalgamated into the Manukau City, and in 2010 all areas of the Auckland Region were merged into a single unitary body, administered by Auckland Council. By the 2010s, areas of South Auckland such as Papatoetoe had developed as major areas for South Asian communities.

Between 2016 and 2020, Ihumātao was occupied by protesters, who were concerned at the construction of a housing development on the archaeological site, and called for the land to be returned to mana whenua. In late 2020, the New Zealand Government purchased the site, with no decision being made on the future of the land.

Areas south of Papakura began developing into new suburban housing in the late 2010s. The first of these was Paerata Rise north of Pukekohe, joined by Auranga, an area of coastal Karaka. A major development is planned for the Drury-Ōpaheke area, to be developed in stages from the 2020s through to the 2050s. Three new train stations will be constructed in the area between Papakura and Pukekohe. In the 2010s, a light rail line was proposed to link the Auckland City Centre to Māngere. In the 2040s, the Auckland Council plans to create a new regional park on Puketutu Island. Much of the island was quarried in the 1950s, and is slowly being refilled with biosolids. At the end of this process, the quarried peaks will be reformed.

== Demographics ==
South Auckland covers 166.94 km^{2} (64.46 sq mi) (Note: In this section, South Auckland is treated as comprising the Māngere-Ōtāhuhu, Ōtara-Papatoetoe, Manurewa and Papakura local board areas.) and had an estimated population of 379,400 as of June 2025, with a population density of 2,273 people per km^{2}.

Historical population
Year	Pop.	±% p.a.
2006	259,227	—
2013	274,500	+0.82%
2018	316,878	+2.91%
2023	336,693	+1.22%

South Auckland had a population of 336,693 in the 2023 New Zealand census, an increase of 19,815 people (6.3%) since the 2018 census, and an increase of 62,193 people (22.7%) since the 2013 census. There were 167,883 males, 168,006 females and 810 people of other genders in 89,619 dwellings. 2.2% of people identified as LGBTIQ+. There were 80,334 people (23.9%) aged under 15 years, 79,758 (23.7%) aged 15 to 29, 145,350 (43.2%) aged 30 to 64, and 31,248 (9.3%) aged 65 or older.

People could identify as more than one ethnicity. The results were 23.1% European (Pākehā); 20.7% Māori; 42.8% Pasifika; 29.2% Asian; 1.5% Middle Eastern, Latin American and African New Zealanders (MELAA); and 1.1% other, which includes people giving their ethnicity as "New Zealander". English was spoken by 90.1%, Māori language by 5.1%, Samoan by 13.5%, and other languages by 27.3%. No language could be spoken by 3.0% (e.g. too young to talk). New Zealand Sign Language was known by 0.5%. The percentage of people born overseas was 40.6, compared with 28.8% nationally.

Religious affiliations were 45.7% Christian, 8.4% Hindu, 4.1% Islam, 2.0% Māori religious beliefs, 1.5% Buddhist, 0.2% New Age, and 5.5% other religions. People who answered that they had no religion were 26.3%, and 6.6% of people did not answer the census question.

Of those at least 15 years old, 42,492 (16.6%) people had a bachelor's or higher degree, 120,042 (46.8%) had a post-high school certificate or diploma, and 93,837 (36.6%) people exclusively held high school qualifications. 16,116 people (6.3%) earned over $100,000 compared to 12.1% nationally. The employment status of those at least 15 was that 131,325 (51.2%) people were employed full-time, 23,265 (9.1%) were part-time, and 12,879 (5.0%) were unemployed.

Individual statistical areas
Name	Area (km^{2})	Population	Density (per km^{2})	Dwellings	Median age	Median income
Māngere-Ōtāhuhu Local Board Area	52.47	78,642	1,499	19,632	30.9 years	$34,700
Ōtara-Papatoetoe Local Board Area	37.12	86,949	2,342	22,380	31.1 years	$36,800
Manurewa Local Board Area	37.10	98,784	2,663	25,938	31.0 years	$37,300
Papakura Local Board Area	40.25	72,318	1,797	21,669	32.3 years	$44,000
New Zealand					38.1 years	$41,500

== Politics and governance ==
=== Local government ===
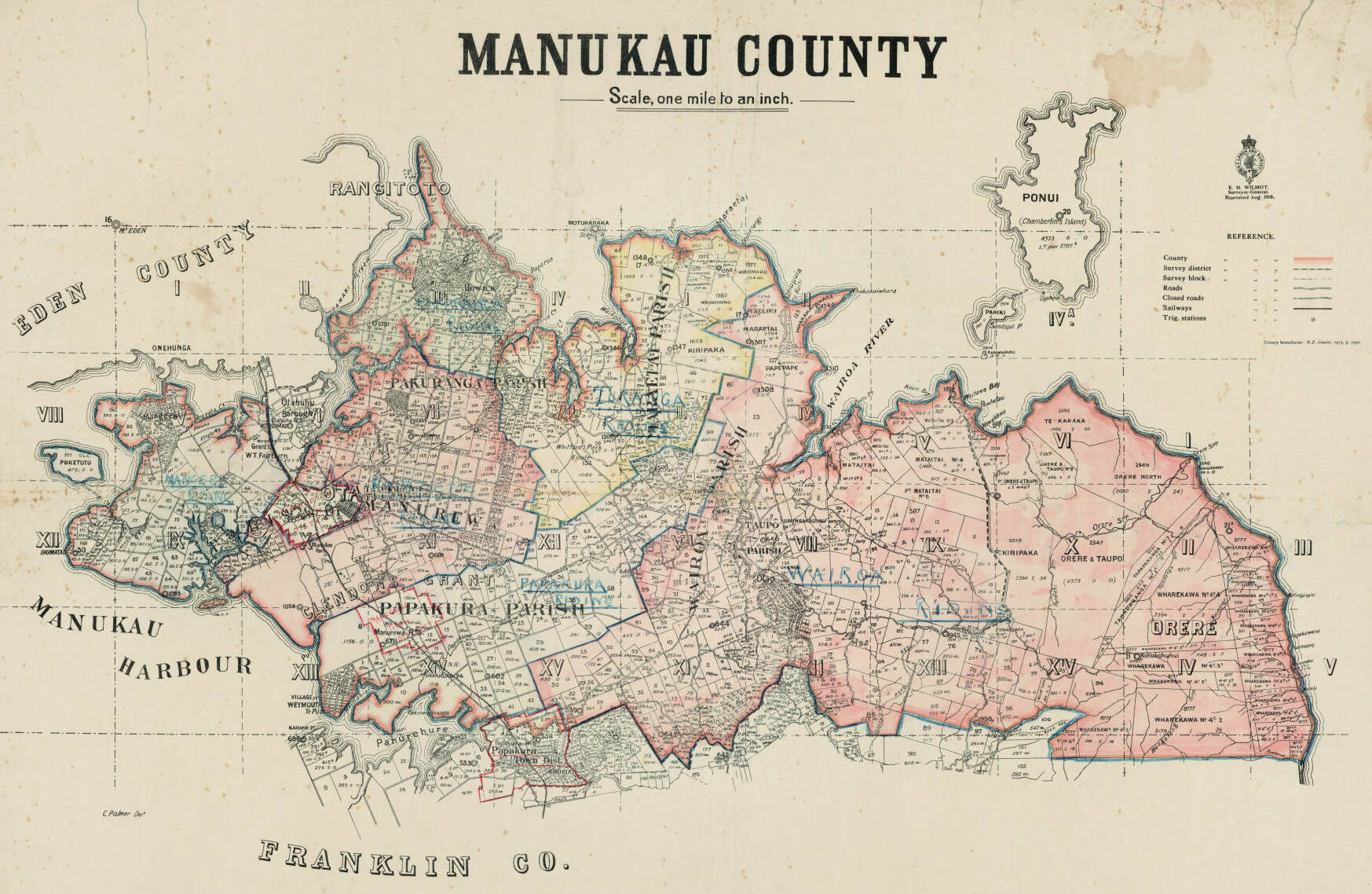
A cadastral map of the former Manukau County in 1918

Road boards were the first local government in South Auckland in the 1860s, which were established across the Auckland Province due to a lack of central government funding for road improvements. In South Auckland, over 20 road boards were established to administer upkeep for major arterial connections, some of which included the Drury Road Board, Mangere Road Board, Awhitu Road Board and the Hunua Road Board. In 1876, the Manukau County was established as the local government for South Auckland. In 1881, the Town District Act allowed communities of more than 50 households to amalgamate into a town district. Large town districts were able to form boroughs, which had their own councils and a greater lending power. The county was split into two bodies in 1912: the Manukau County Council and a new body, the Franklin County Council. Between 1912 and 1955, seven areas of South Auckland split from the Manukau, Franklin or Eden Counties to form independent boroughs: Pukekohe and Ōtāhuhu in 1912, Manurewa in 1937, Papakura in 1938, Papatoetoe in 1946 and Waiuku and Tuakau in 1955.

In the early 1960s, a movement began to amalgamate the various town and borough councils in South Auckland into a single city, which became known as the Manukau City. Churchill was an early name proposed for the city, which was disparaged at the time. The city formed in 1965, and later that year was joined by Papatoetoe City, after the Papatoetoe borough grew in population. Papakura became recognised as a city in 1975, and in 1986 Ōtāhuhu joined with Mount Wellington to form a unified city, known as Tamaki City. With the 1989 local government reforms, Manukau, Papatoetoe and Howick in East Auckland merged to form a larger Manukau City, while Tamaki City was amalgamated into Auckland City along with the rest of the Auckland isthmus.

On 1 November 2010, Manukau City and Franklin District were merged with the surrounding areas of Auckland to form a single local government area, managed by the Auckland Council as a unitary authority. Within the new system, South Auckland was primarily split into five areas which elect a local board: Māngere-Ōtāhuhu, Manurewa, Ōtara-Papatoetoe, Papakura and Franklin. Ōtāhuhu, previously administered by the Auckland City to the north, was again a part of a South Auckland local government body, and a number of southern and eastern townships within the former Franklin District became part of the Waikato and the Hauraki districts in the Waikato Region, including Tuakau, Pōkeno, Pukekawa, Whakatīwai and Pūkorokoro / Miranda.

In addition to local boards, a number of councillors represent South Auckland on the Auckland Council. Voters in the Māngere-Ōtāhuhu and Ōtara-Papatoetoe areas vote for two councillors as a part of the Manukau ward, and people in the Manurewa and Papakura areas vote for two Manurewa-Papakura ward councillors. Franklin area residents vote for a single Franklin ward councillor.

=== National government ===
Traditionally, South Auckland has strongly supported the Labour Party in general elections. Notably, the general electorates of Māngere, Panmure-Ōtāhuhu and Manurewa are three of Labour's safest seats. However, after the 2023 election, Labour lost the electorate of Takanini which is considered to be a marginal seat.

== Notable people ==
People who hail from South Auckland include Olympic champion John Walker, mountaineer Edmund Hillary, and former Prime Minister David Lange. Many successful sportspeople are South Aucklanders, including rugby players Jonah Lomu and Eric Rush, rugby league player Ruben Wiki, heavyweight boxers David Tua and Joseph Parker, cricketers Daryl Tuffey and Ish Sodhi, kickboxer Mark Hunt, indycar racer Scott Dixon, and shot-putter Valerie Adams. Prominent entertainers from South Auckland include musicians Young Sid, Savage, Pauly Fuemana, and P-Money.

== Bibliography ==
- Ballara, Angela (2003). "Tāmaki-makau-rau (Auckland isthmus)". Taua: 'musket wars', 'land wars' or tikanga?: warfare in Maori society in the early nineteenth century. Auckland: Penguin. ISBN 9780143018896.
- Belich, James (1986). The New Zealand Wars. Auckland: Penguin. ISBN 0-14-027504-5.
- Bloomfield, G.T. (1973). The Evolution of Local Government Areas in Metropolitan Auckland, 1840–1971. Auckland University Press, Oxford University Press. ISBN 0-19-647714-X.
- Cameron, Ewen; Hayward, Bruce; Murdoch, Graeme (2008). A Field Guide to Auckland: Exploring the Region's Natural and Historical Heritage (Revised ed.). Random House New Zealand. ISBN 978-1-86962-1513.
- Hayward, Bruce W. (1989). Kauri Gum and the Gumdiggers. The Bush Press. ISBN 0-908608-39-X.
- Hayward, Bruce (2009). "Land, Sea and Sky". In Macdonald, Finlay; Kerr, Ruth (eds.). West: The History of Waitakere. Random House. ISBN 9781869790080.
- Jones, Pei Te Hurinui; Biggs, Bruce (2004). Ngā iwi o Tainui: Nga Koorero Tuku Iho a Nga Tuupuna = The traditional history of the Tainui people. Auckland [N.Z.]: Auckland University Press. ISBN 1869403312.
- Lancaster, Mike (2011). "Auckland International Airport". In La Roche, John (ed.). Evolving Auckland: The City's Engineering Heritage. Wily Publications. ISBN 9781927167038.
- Mackintosh, Lucy (2021). Shifting Grounds: Deep Histories of Tāmaki Makaurau Auckland. Bridget Williams Books. doi:10.7810/9781988587332. ISBN 978-1-988587-33-2.
- Murdoch, Graeme (1990). "Nga Tohu o Waitakere: the Maori Place Names of the Waitakere River Valley and its Environs; their Background History and an Explanation of their Meaning". In Northcote-Bade, James (ed.). West Auckland Remembers. Vol. 1. West Auckland Historical Society. pp. 9–32. ISBN 0-473-00983-8.
- Payne, Val (2005). Celebrating Mangere Bridge. Mangere Historical Society. ISBN 0-476-00941-3.
- Reidy, Jade (2009). "How the West Was Run". In Macdonald, Finlay; Kerr, Ruth (eds.). West: The History of Waitakere. Random House. pp. 237–256. ISBN 9781869790080.
- Stone, R. C. J. (2001). From Tamaki-makau-rau to Auckland. Auckland University Press. ISBN 1869402596.
- Walker, Ranginui (2004). Ka Whawhai Tonu Matou - Struggle Without End (2nd ed.). Auckland, New Zealand: Penguin Books. ISBN 9780143019459.
- Wichman, Gwen (1990), A brief history of Manurewa, Manurewa: Manurewa Historical Society, Wikidata Q117327773
- Wichman, Gwen (2001). Soaring Bird: A History of Manurewa to 1965. Manurewa: Manurewa Historical Society. ISBN 0-473-07114-2. Wikidata Q117421984.
