= Favona =

- Suburb
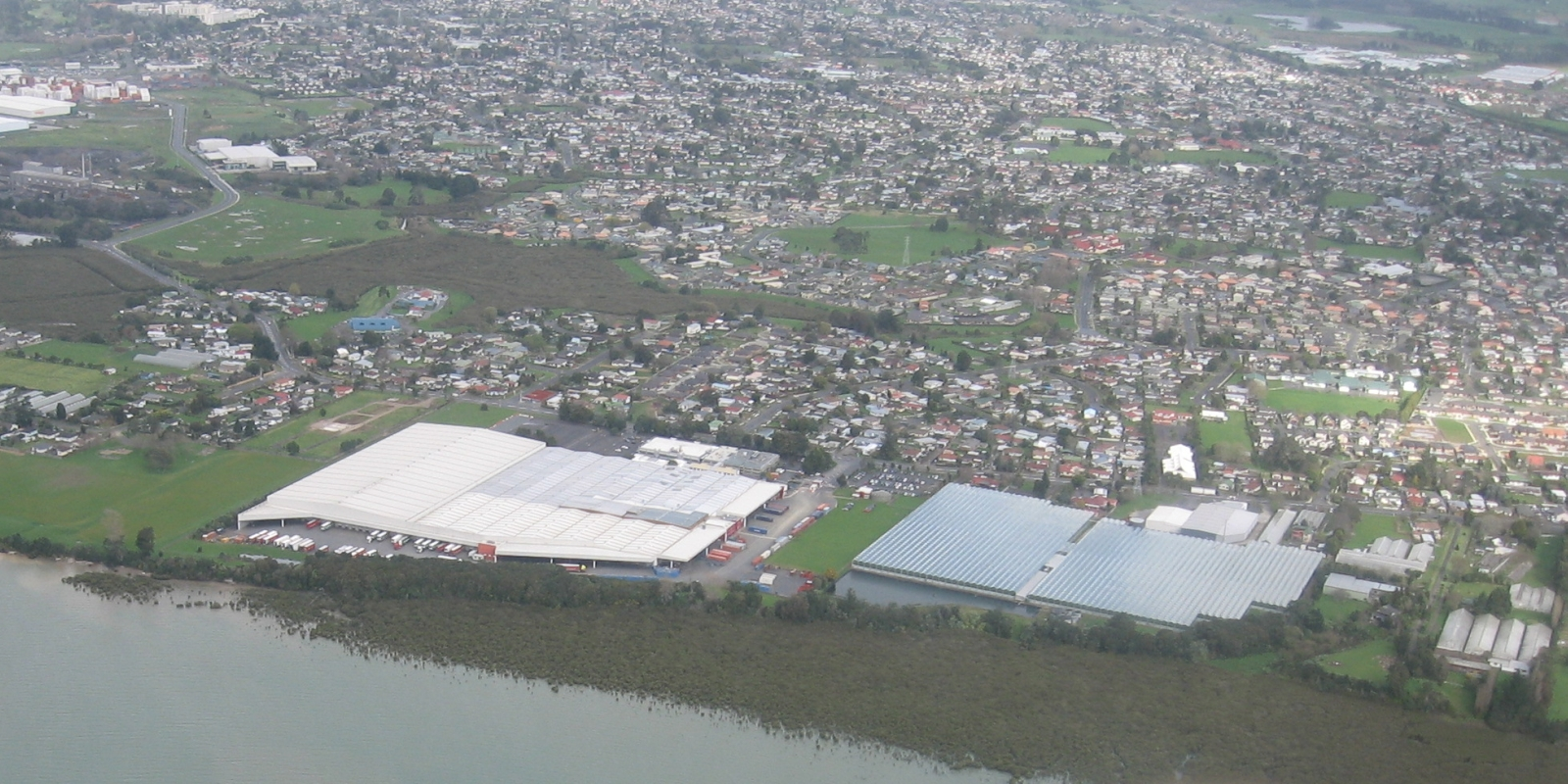
- Favona from the air, looking south.
- Interactive map of Favona
- Coordinates: 36°57′9″S 174°48′1″E
- Country: New Zealand
- City: Auckland
- Local authority: Auckland Council
- Electoral ward: Manukau ward
- Local board: Māngere-Ōtāhuhu Local Board

Area
  - Land: 261 ha (640 acres)

Population (June 2025)
  - Total: 11,080
  - Density: 4,250/km^{2} (11,000/sq mi)

Māngere Bridge	(Māngere Inlet)	(Māngere Inlet)
Māngere Bridge	Favona	Ōtāhuhu
Māngere	Māngere	Māngere East

Favona is a semi industrial and residential suburb of Auckland, New Zealand, and is part of the Māngere area. The suburb is in the Manukau ward, one of the thirteen administrative divisions of Auckland city, and is under governance of the Auckland Council.

== Etymology ==
The origin of the name Favona is unknown, although it may relate to the cattle of the Robertson family who farmed in Māngere. Favona was the name of a race horse who came to prominence in the 1890s, who raised on John Lennard's farm in Māngere. In 1899 Hugh Mosman, member of the Queensland Legislative Council, purchased 300 acres of farmland in the area, calling his estate the Favona Farm.

== Geography ==
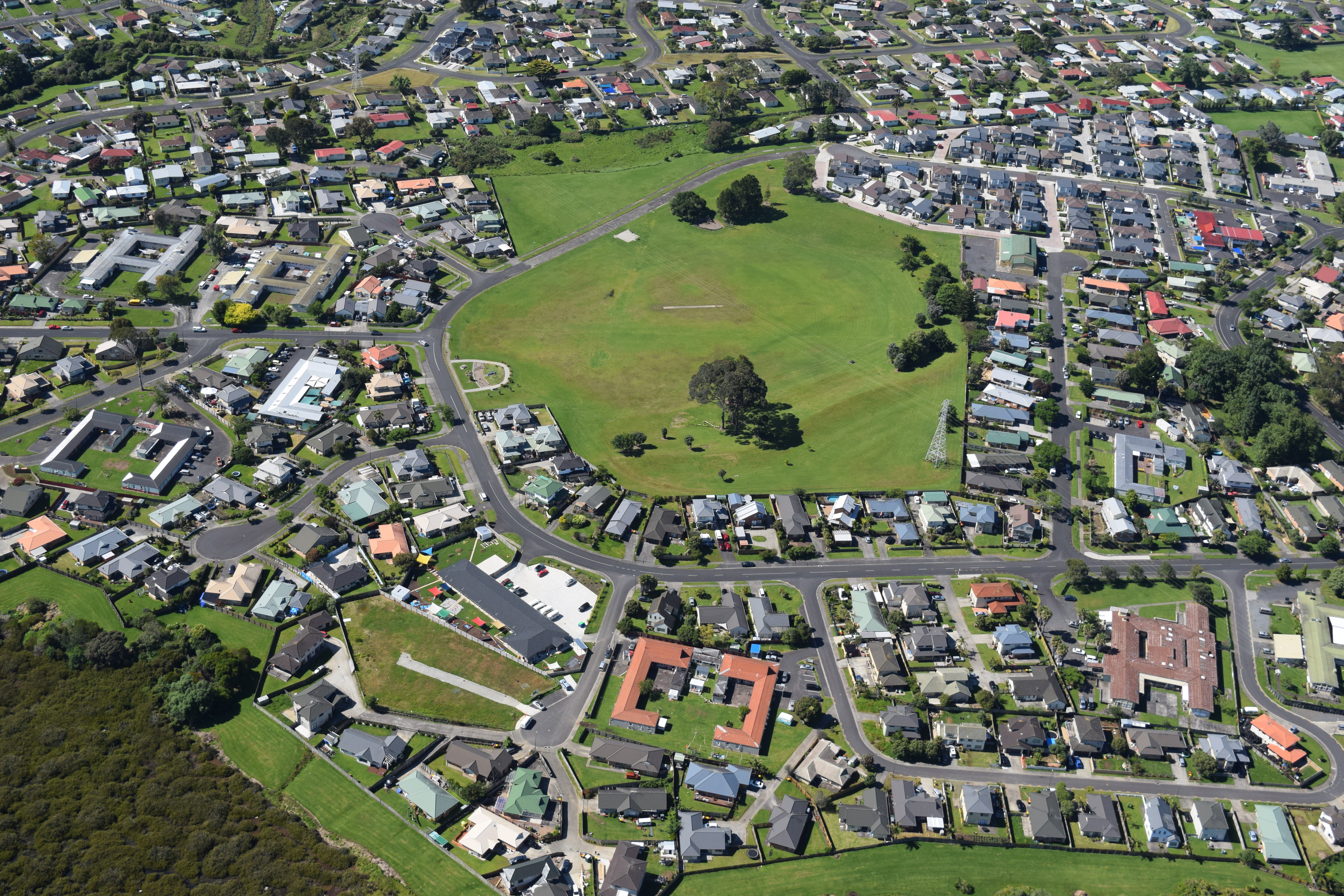
The Boggust Park Crater

Favona is located south of the Māngere Inlet, around the Tararata Creek and Harania Creek. The Boggust Park Crater in Favona is the oldest known feature of the Auckland volcanic field, erupting an estimated 130,000 years ago.

== History ==
The first evidence of Tāmaki Māori in the coastal Māngere area comes from the 14th century, with evidence of the first settlements later in the 15th century. Area is close to Te Tō Waka, the shortest portage connecting the Manukau Harbour to the Waitematā Harbour at Ōtāhuhu.

In January 1836 missionary William Thomas Fairburn brokered a land sale between Tāmaki Māori chiefs, Pōtatau Te Wherowhero and Turia of Ngāti Te Rau, covering the majority of modern-day South Auckland between Ōtāhuhu and Papakura. The sale was envisioned as a way to end hostilities in the area, but it is unclear what the chiefs understood or consented to. Māori continued to live in South Auckland, unchanged by this sale. Fairburn was criticised for the sheer size of the purchase, and in 1842 the Crown significantly reduced the size of his land holdings, and the Crown partitioned much of the land for European settlers. Until the 1860s, the Māori population of the Manukau Harbour and Waikato areas produced goods to sell or barter at the port of Onehunga. On 9 July 1863, due to fears of the Māori King Movement, Governor Grey proclaimed that all Māori living in the South Auckland area needed to swear loyalty to the Queen and give up their weapons. Most people refused due to strong links to Tainui, leaving for the south before the Government's Invasion of the Waikato.

In 1862, the first local government was established in the area, with the formation of the Mangerei Highway Board. Favona remained a rural area until the mid-20th Century. In the 1899, Hugh Mosman, member of the Queensland Legislative Council, purchased a 300-acre farm, which he used to breed race horses. The farm was purchased by investors in 1910 and subdivided into urban farmlets, under the name Favona Park. Some areas of Favona also historically had large areas of greenhouses, such as for tomato production.

In mid-1922, the first store opened for the Favona community, which was followed by an Anglican hall, used for both church services and as a community hall. From the 1920s until the 1970s, Favona was an area popular with Chinese market gardeners, including the Luen, Chong and Ou Hong families. Black Bridge, a wooden bridge across the Tararata Creek, acted as the terminus for bus services from Onehunga and the city. After World War II, large-scale industrial developments began operating in Favona, including the Pacific Steel steel mill, which opened in the 1960s.

The area is one is of relative poverty and until 2005 had one of New Zealand's largest caravan parks. beginning as an unlicensed caravan park in 1986. Favona hosts the Māngere campus of Te Wānanga o Aotearoa. Numerous shipping and freight forwarding companies have premises in the industrial areas, including the national distribution headquarters of supermarket chain Progressive Enterprises.

== Demographics ==
Favona covers 2.61 km^{2} (1.01 sq mi) and had an estimated population of 11,080 as of June 2025, with a population density of 4,245 people per km^{2}.

Historical population
Year	Pop.	±% p.a.
2006	7,488	—
2013	8,514	+1.85%
2018	9,687	+2.62%
2023	10,248	+1.13%

Favona had a population of 10,248 in the 2023 New Zealand census, an increase of 561 people (5.8%) since the 2018 census, and an increase of 1,734 people (20.4%) since the 2013 census. There were 5,040 males, 5,187 females and 18 people of other genders in 2,160 dwellings. 1.8% of people identified as LGBTIQ+. The median age was 29.6 years (compared with 38.1 years nationally). There were 2,454 people (23.9%) aged under 15 years, 2,724 (26.6%) aged 15 to 29, 4,197 (41.0%) aged 30 to 64, and 867 (8.5%) aged 65 or older.

People could identify as more than one ethnicity. The results were 11.7% European (Pākehā); 14.3% Māori; 66.8% Pasifika; 20.5% Asian; 1.5% Middle Eastern, Latin American and African New Zealanders (MELAA); and 0.6% other, which includes people giving their ethnicity as "New Zealander". English was spoken by 89.6%, Māori language by 3.6%, Samoan by 22.2%, and other languages by 28.5%. No language could be spoken by 3.0% (e.g. too young to talk). New Zealand Sign Language was known by 0.5%. The percentage of people born overseas was 43.1, compared with 28.8% nationally.

Religious affiliations were 61.0% Christian, 6.1% Hindu, 5.0% Islam, 1.4% Māori religious beliefs, 0.9% Buddhist, 0.1% New Age, and 0.8% other religions. People who answered that they had no religion were 17.8%, and 7.0% of people did not answer the census question.

Of those at least 15 years old, 1,080 (13.9%) people had a bachelor's or higher degree, 3,789 (48.6%) had a post-high school certificate or diploma, and 2,922 (37.5%) people exclusively held high school qualifications. The median income was $33,900, compared with $41,500 nationally. 330 people (4.2%) earned over $100,000 compared to 12.1% nationally. The employment status of those at least 15 was that 3,810 (48.9%) people were employed full-time, 750 (9.6%) were part-time, and 441 (5.7%) were unemployed.

Individual statistical areas
Name	Area (km^{2})	Population	Density (per km^{2})	Dwellings	Median age	Median income
Favona North	1.11	2,961	2,668	675	30.0 years	$31,500
Favona West	0.86	3,504	4,074	744	27.5 years	$33,700
Favona East	0.64	3,783	5,911	744	31.4 years	$35,600
New Zealand					38.1 years	$41,500

== Education ==
Favona School is a contributing primary school (years 1–6) with a roll of 278. The school was established in 1973.

Koru School is a full primary (years 1–6) with a roll of 455.

Sir Keith Park School is a special school with a roll of 188. It caters for students with intellectual disability or special needs.

All these schools are coeducational. Rolls are as of July 2026.

== Bibliography ==
- Mackintosh, Lucy (2021). Shifting Grounds: Deep Histories of Tāmaki Makaurau Auckland. Bridget Williams Books. doi:10.7810/9781988587332. ISBN 978-1-988587-33-2.
- Payne, Val (2015). Favona: Its History and Stories. Mangere Historical Society. ISBN 978-0-473-44065-7.
- Wichman, Gwen (1990). Soaring Bird: a History of Manurewa to 1965. Manurewa: Manurewa Historical Society. ISBN 0-473-07114-2.
