= Māngere Inlet =

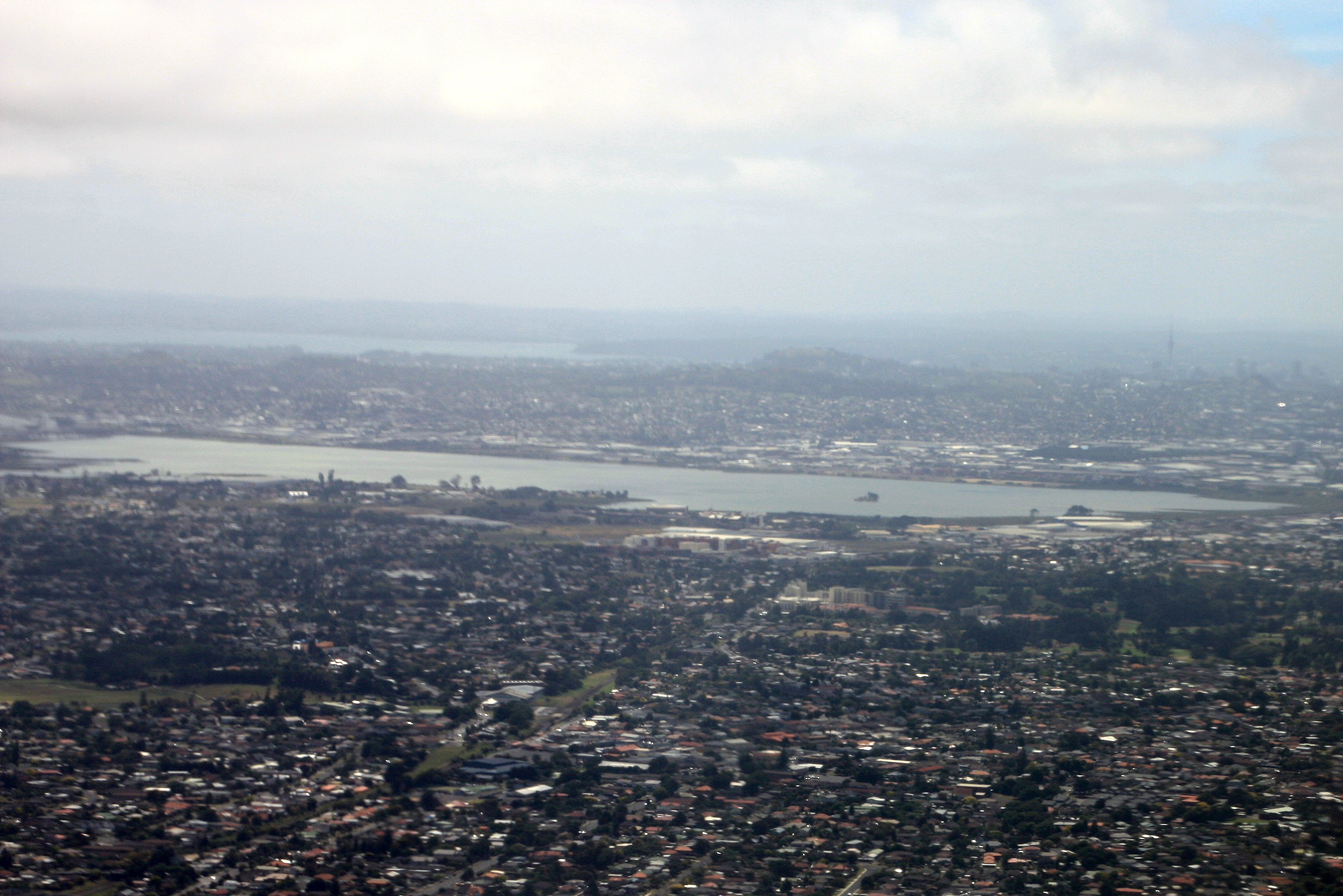
- Aerial view of Māngere Inlet (2009)

- Location within New Zealand
- Interactive map of Māngere Inlet
- Location: Auckland, North Island
- Coordinates: 36.938°S 174.804°E
- River sources: Harania Creek, Tararata Creek, Anns Creek
- Primary outflows: Manukau Harbour
- Surface elevation: 0 m (0 ft)
- Islands: Ngarango Otainui Island

Mangere Inlet is an arm of the Manukau Harbour, the southwestern of the two harbours of Auckland, New Zealand and itself an arm of the Tasman Sea. The inlet lies between the Auckland isthmus and South Auckland, and has a size of 6.6 km^{2} and a catchment of 34.5 km^{2}, being considered to extend to just west of Onehunga (including where the Port of Onehunga is now situated). It is an environment highly modified by land reclamation and human uses, with the northern shoreline especially affected. However, the inlet also acts as a natural sedimentation sink, thus being especially at risk of contamination.

== Geography ==
It is surrounded by the suburbs of Te Papapa, Southdown, Westfield, Ōtāhuhu, Māngere East, Favona, and Māngere Bridge. The narrowest point on the Auckland isthmus is at Ōtāhuhu, where the coast of the Māngere Inlet is a mere 1200 m from the Otahuhu Creek, which ultimately feeds into the Hauraki Gulf.

The Māngere Bridge crosses the western end of the inlet where it joins the main body of the Manukau Harbour. At this point the inlet is about 750 m wide. The Waikaraka Cycleway also travels along the northern shoreline of the inlet.

Ngarango Otainui Island is situated in the inlet at the eastern end near Ōtāhuhu.

== History ==
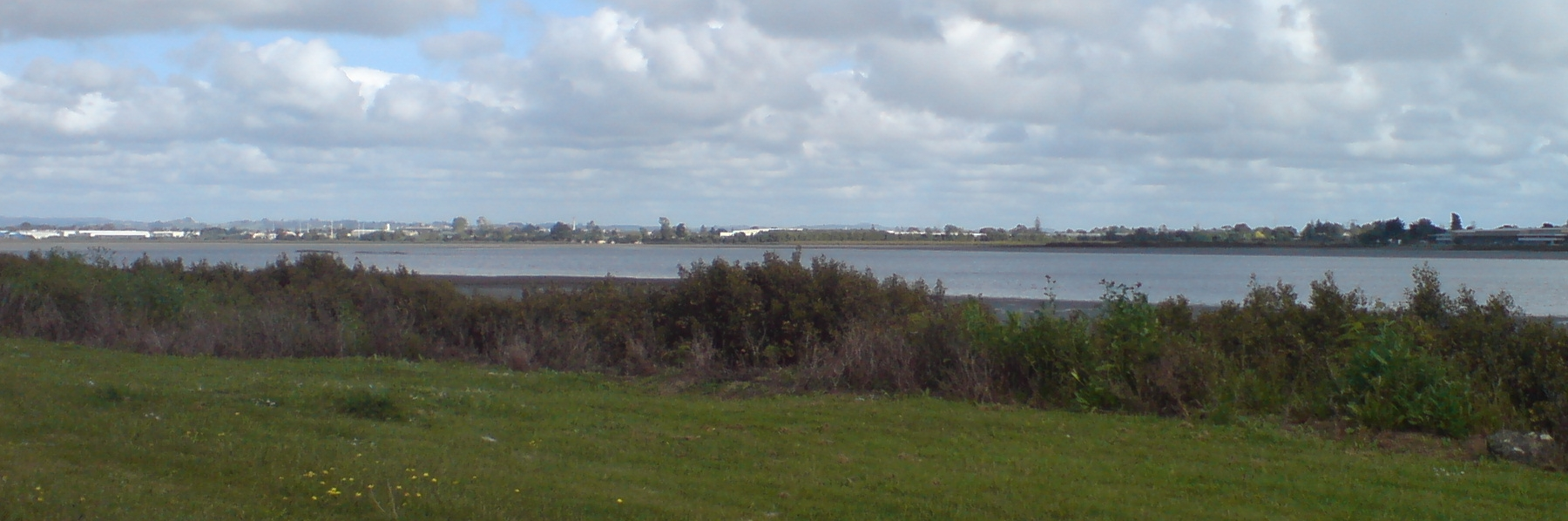
A look over the inlet to the south, near the western end.

The inlet was traditionally known as Te Waimokoia to Tāmaki Māori.

Te Tō Waka at Ōtāhuhu is the location of one of the overland routes between the two harbours (and thus the Pacific Ocean and the Tasman Sea), where the Maori would beach their waka (canoes) and drag them overland to the other coast, thus avoiding having to paddle around Cape Reinga. This made the area of immense strategic importance in both pre-European times and during the early years of European occupation. Portage Road, Ōtāhuhu approximately follows this route.

In the 1850s, after settlement by Europeans, the areas around the inlet had become the agricultural centre of Auckland. Later industrial expansion westwards from the new railway line at Westfield led to increasing discharges of contaminants into the inlet.

In 1947, Dove-Myer Robinson (then a council member of the Auckland Drainage Board) suggested an alternative to the planned Motukorea / Browns Island sewage scheme, where the Māngere Inlet would be dammed beneath at the Māngere Bridge and all of Auckland's sewage sent to the inlet, acting as a large-scale oxidation pond filled with water hyacinths. The idea did not progress, and eventually the Manukau Wastewater Treatment Plant was opened, which included oxidation ponds located between Puketutu Island and Māngere.

== Environment ==
The inlet is highly man-modified, with three embayments at the inlets of historic streams having been lost along the northern shore, to a significant degree for use as landfills, and a loss of tidal inundation to the Hopua volcanic crater forming the Onehunga Basin further west. Ann’s Creek in the north-east still has a short section of open stream remaining in the north-east. Land reclamation in the 1960s for the Westfield Rail Yards also reduced the inlet in the east, while the southern shore is less modified.

The area is generally known for relatively muddy, sedimented waters, which seem to predate human occupation of the area. Mangrove swamp fringes are present around most of the shoreline, becoming less common west of Māngere Bridge.

For many years the many industries, from meatworks and abattoirs, to phosphate fertiliser works and other factories located here were discharging large amounts of untreated waste into the Manukau Harbour. This had a detrimental effect on the ecology of the harbour which at the turn of the 20th century had been a popular and attractive place to swim, sail, fish and gather shellfish. During the 1950s, the decomposition of organic wastes (including from residential areas and facilities like Middlemore Hospital into the mud flats led to sulphate reduction under anaerobic conditions – leading to complaints about hydrogen sulphide smells, and blackening of lead paint in the areas around the inlet. From 1962, the Mangere sewage works removed many of the household and industrial wastes that were previously discharged and led to significant improvements. As of 2008, a number of coastal protection zones had been established around the shores of the inlet.

However, industrial sewage mixed with stormwater overflows, and other contamination still leads to above-average traces of toxins like pesticides, insecticides, PCBs and copper in the mussels and oysters sampled by testing.

In the discussions around Stadium New Zealand, constructing the new venue over the eastern shoreline of the inlet was mooted by several architects as a potential alternative to the Auckland CBD location. They considered that the site would be far enough away from residential areas to suit the need for a large and busy multi-use stadium, but would also be able to be accessed easily by public transport (trains) and cars, more so than the CBD location. However, the idea failed to get public traction.
