= Ngarango Otainui Island =

Island in New Zealand

Native name: Ngā Rango e Rua o Tainui
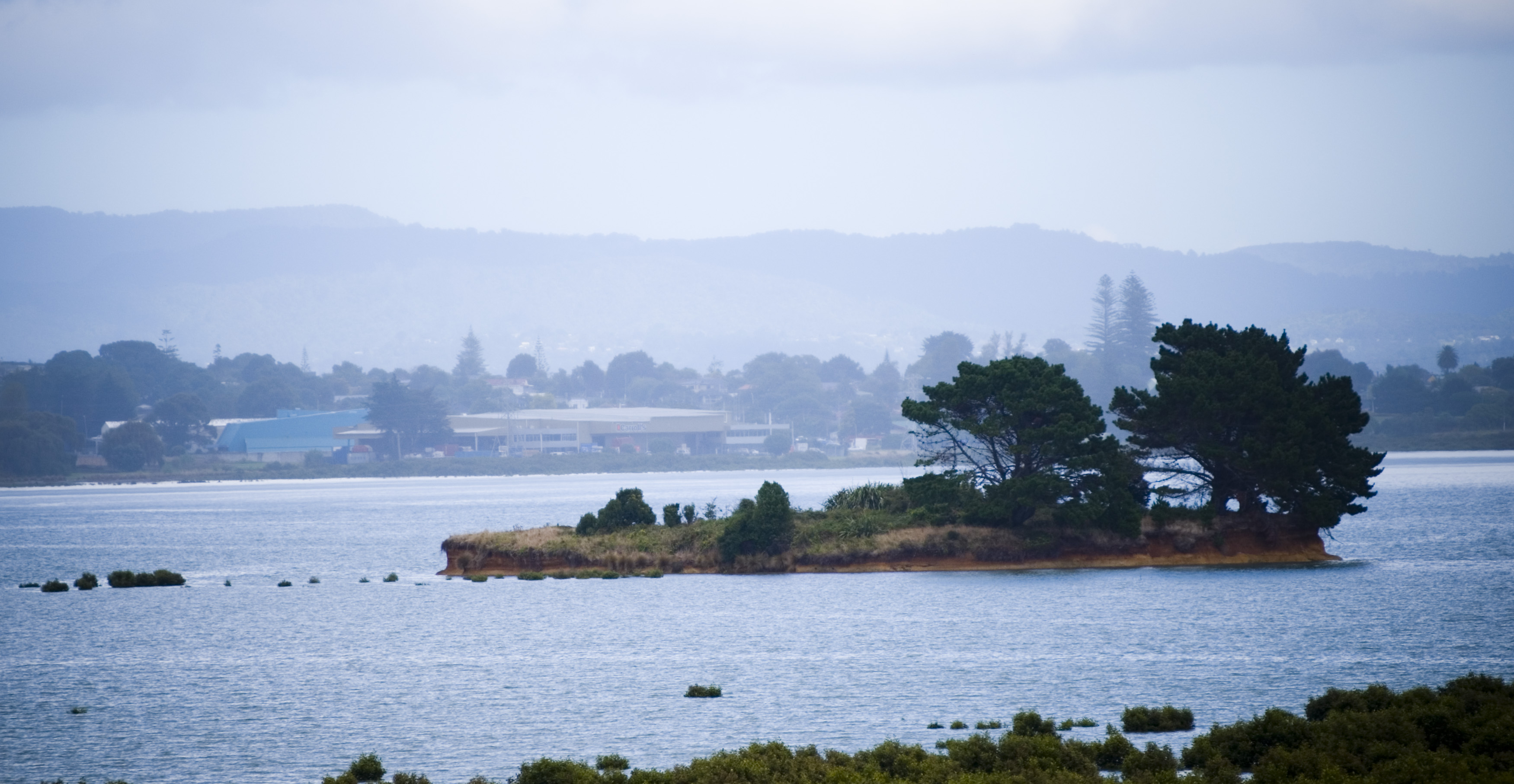
- Ngarango Otainui Island in 2008
- Interactive map of Ngarango Otainui Island

Geography
- Location: Auckland
- Coordinates: 36.93883°S 174.82011°E
- Adjacent to: Māngere Inlet, Manukau Harbour
- Highest elevation: 13 m (43 ft)

Administration
- New Zealand

Ngarango Otainui Island is an island that was last privately owned by Arzan Hajee and Arif Hajee. It is situated in the Manukau Harbour in Auckland, New Zealand. The Island is 5 km from the Auckland Airport and 10 km from Auckland CBD (as the crow flies). It can be visible from One Tree Hill. The land area is approximately 3288 square meters when it was last surveyed and sold off in the 1960s but is profoundly smaller than this in the 21st century due to storm surge and erosion. This was one of the smallest privately owned Islands in New Zealand. The New Zealand Transport Agency bought the island in 2017 as part of the now scrapped plans for the controversial East-West Motorway link

The island, traditionally known as Ngā Rango e Rua o Tainui, is known as the final resting place of the skids which were used to transport the Tainui migratory canoe across Te Tō Waka, the Ōtāhuhu portage.

== See also ==
- Mangere Inlet
- List of islands of New Zealand
