= Boggust Park Crater =

Volcano in the Auckland volcanic field, New Zealand

Coordinates: 36.955413°S 174.813552°E

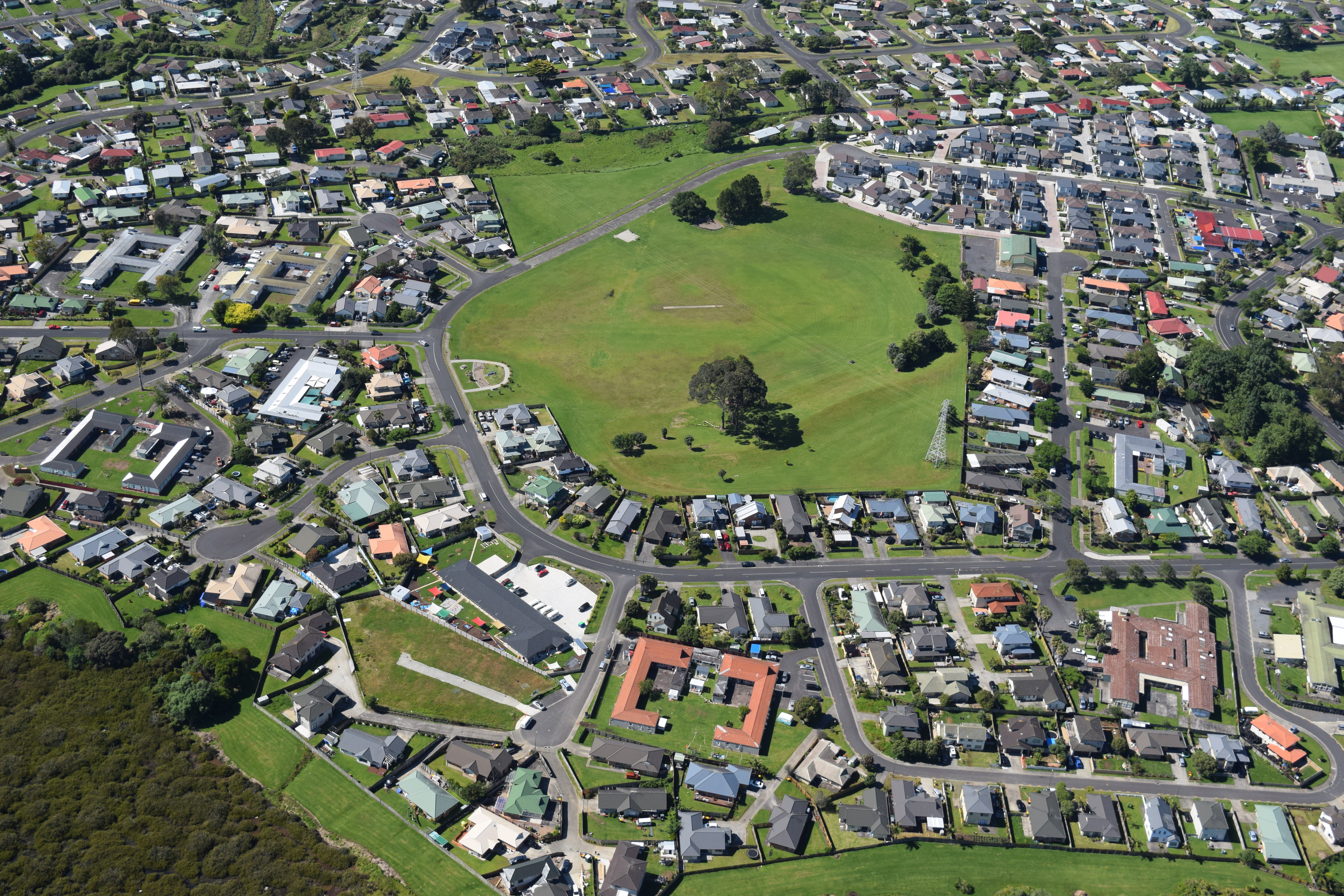
Aerial view of the Boggust Park Crater in 2018

Boggust Park Crater is a volcano in the Auckland volcanic field, New Zealand. Located in the Favona area of the Māngere suburb, it is one of Auckland city's older volcanoes. It was first recognised as a volcano in 2011. The park in which it is located is named after Ralph Boggust, former superintendent of Manukau Parks Dept.

The volcano has a 300–400 m diameter crater surrounded on three sides by a 6–8 m high semi-circular tuff ring with steep inner slopes and gentler outer slopes. In places the crest of the tuff ring has been flattened off by bulldozing during subdivision in the 1990s. The tuff ring is breached to the north-east, presumably by the sea during the Last Interglacial warm period, about 130,000 years ago, when the sea level was 5–6 m above the present. The present floor of the crater is about 5 m above present high tide level and slopes down to the edge of Harania Creek estuary on the Manukau Harbour. After eruption, Boggust Crater would have become a freshwater lake, before it was breached by the sea to become an intertidal lagoon for a few thousand years, rather like Panmure Basin today. The sea level dropped about 120,000 years ago and the crater became a swampy depression until 1 m of fill was added and drainage installed to make it a recreational sports field.
