= Tāmaki Bridge =

Road bridge in Auckland, New Zealand

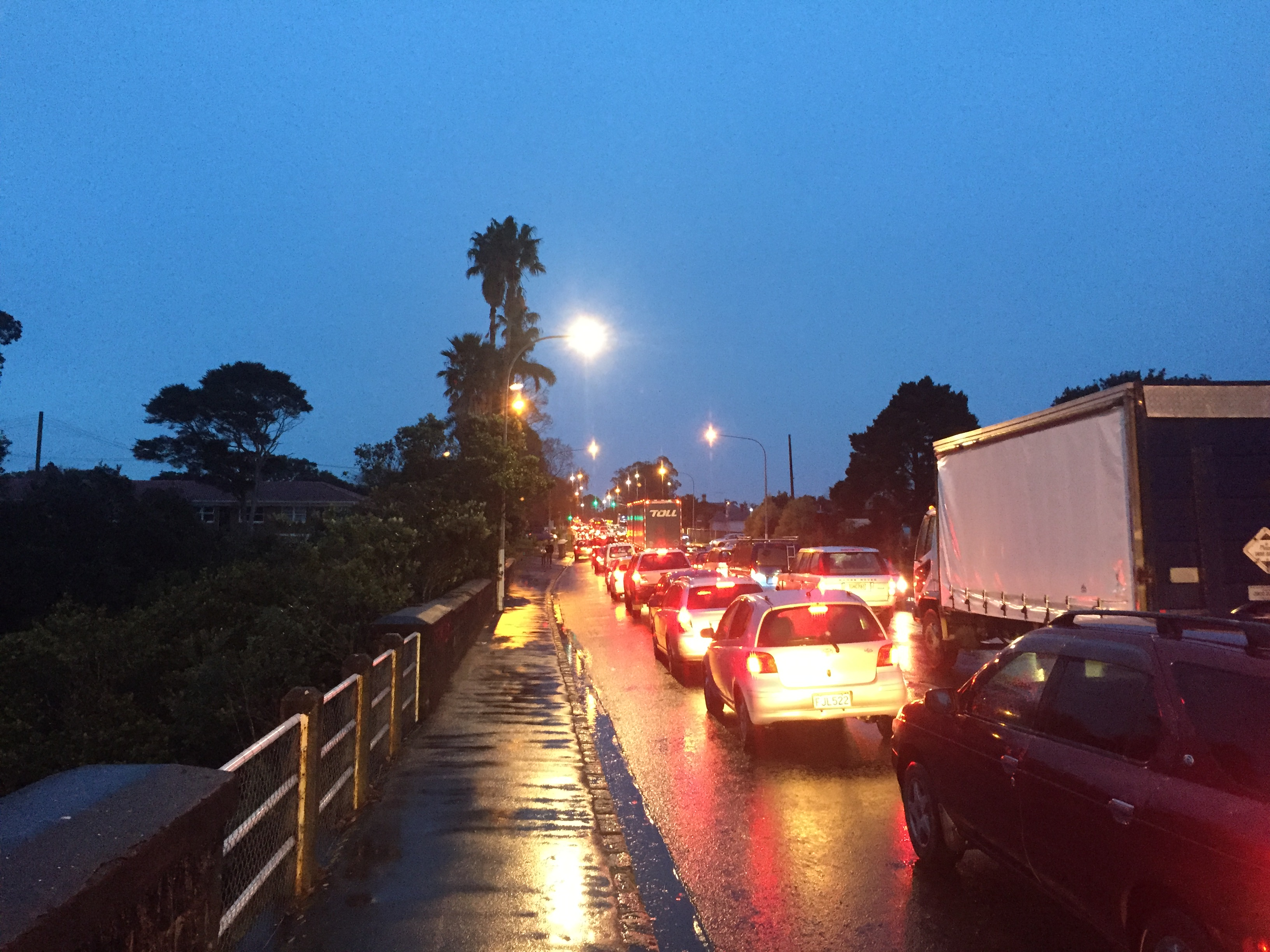
- Coordinates: 36.955142°S 174.849641°E
- Crosses: Tāmaki River
- Locale: Auckland, New Zealand
- Maintained by: NZ Transport Agency

The Tāmaki Bridge is a bridge along the Great South Road crossing the Tāmaki River in Auckland, New Zealand, connecting the suburbs of Ōtāhuhu and Papatoetoe. The first bridge opened in 1851, and was significantly widened in 1932.

== History ==
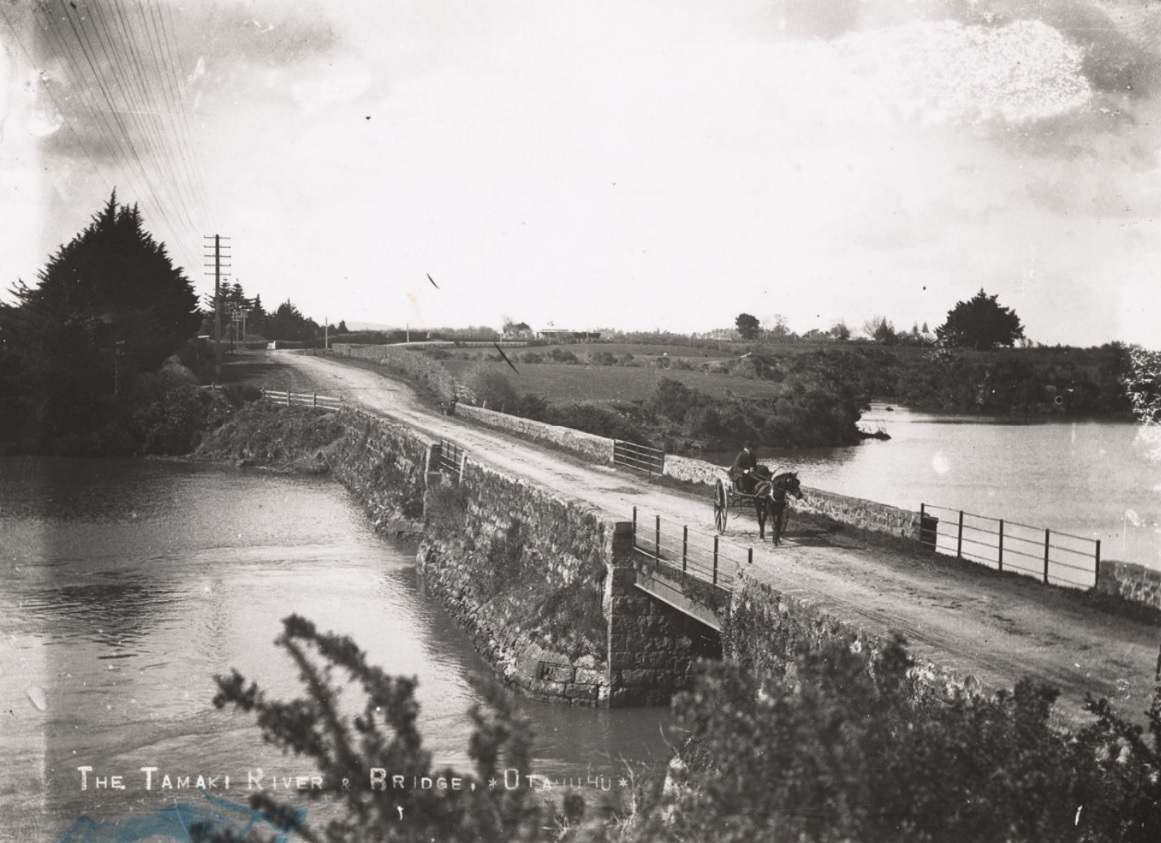
The old Tāmaki Bridge in circa 1910

The first Tāmaki Bridge opened in 1851, and led to greater settlement of Papatoetoe and the areas of Auckland south of the Tāmaki River. The original bridge was constructed from scoria piers connected by wooden platforms, and was rebuilt in 1859.

In the late 19th century, traffic accidents caused damage to the sides of the bridge, leading the Manukau County to make it an offence to drive over the bridge faster than walking pace.

By the 1920s, Ōtāhuhu residents and Auckland road users lobbied the borough council to reconstruct the bridge, which had developed a reputation for being dangerous and poor quality. In 1932, the Ōtāhuhu Borough Council and Manukau County Council significantly widened the bridge, concreting the archway and road overtop of the original bridge.

In 1955, the Auckland Southern Motorway opened between Mount Wellington and Redoubt Road. This included a new motorway bridge, constructed to the east of the Tāmaki Bridge.
