= Māngere East =

- Suburb
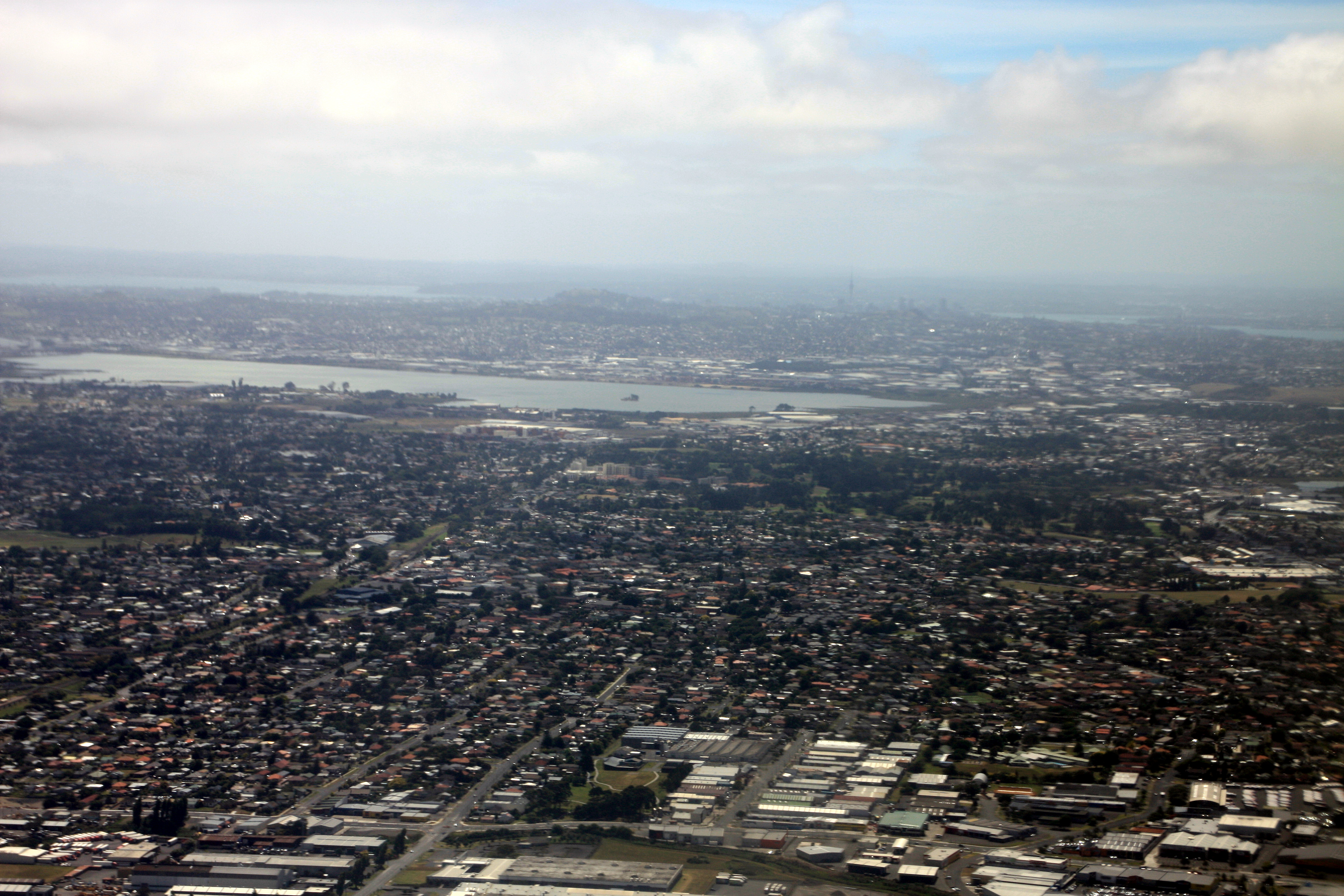
- Aerial view of Māngere East, with the Māngere Inlet and Ōtāhuhu in the background (2009).
- Interactive map of Māngere East
- Coordinates: 36.96612°S 174.82590°E
- Country: New Zealand
- City: Auckland
- Local authority: Auckland Council
- Electoral ward: Manukau ward
- Local board: Māngere-Ōtāhuhu Local Board; Ōtara-Papatoetoe Local Board

Area
  - Land: 662 ha (1,640 acres)

Population (June 2025)
  - Total: 28,620
  - Density: 4,320/km^{2} (11,200/sq mi)
- Postcode: 2024
- Railway stations: Middlemore Railway Station

	Favona	Ōtāhuhu
Māngere	Māngere East	Middlemore
	Papatoetoe

Māngere East or Mangere East is a suburb of Auckland, New Zealand, under the governance of Auckland Council. It is located to the south of Favona, north of Papatoetoe, west of Middlemore, east of Māngere and Māngere Bridge, and southwest of Ōtāhuhu.

In 2019, the name of the suburb was officially gazetted as Māngere East.

== Geography ==
Māngere East is located in South Auckland, east of central Māngere between the Southwestern Motorway and the Southern Line.

== History ==
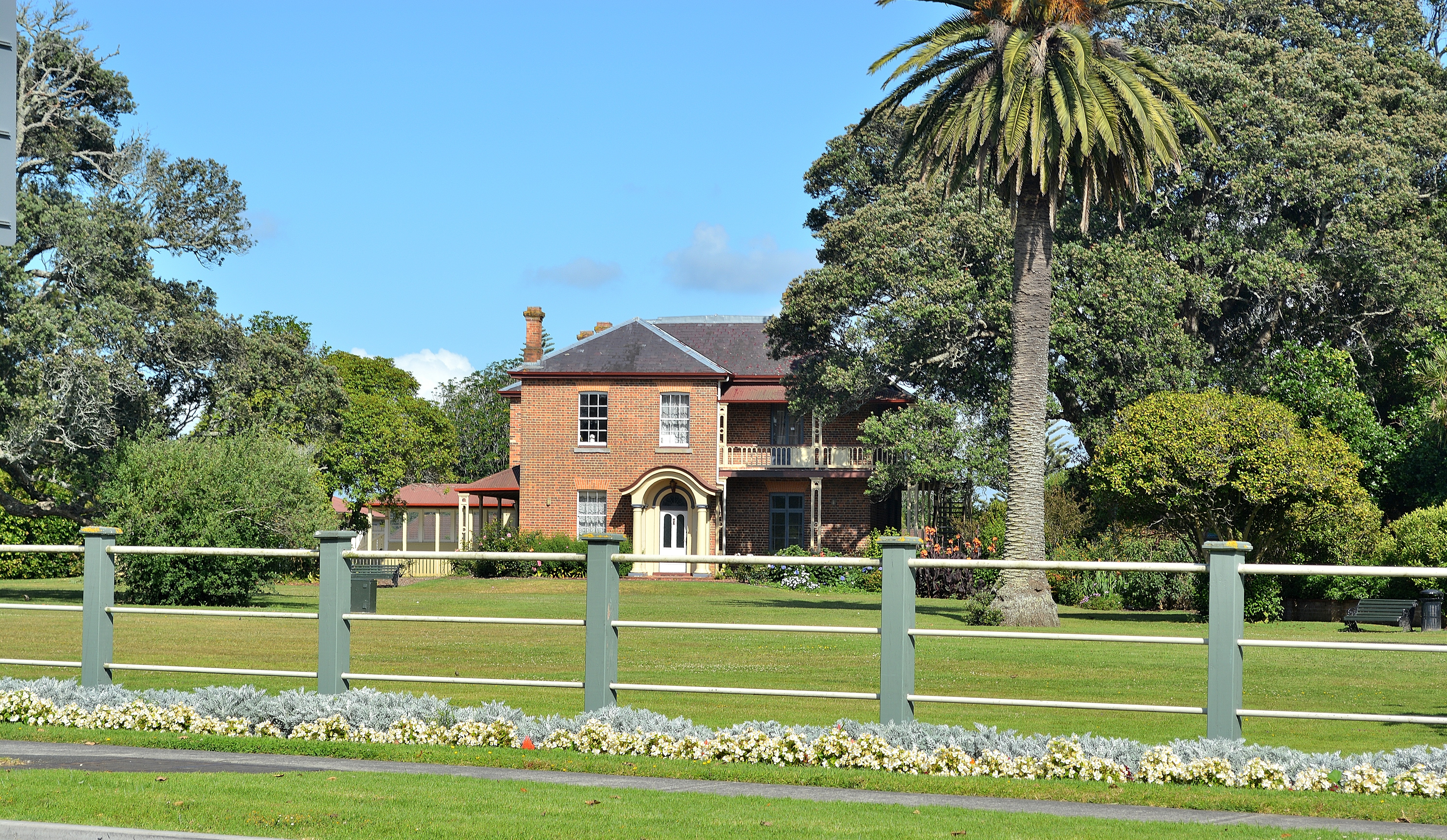
Massey Homestead, a 19th-century country manor and former home of Prime Minister William Massey

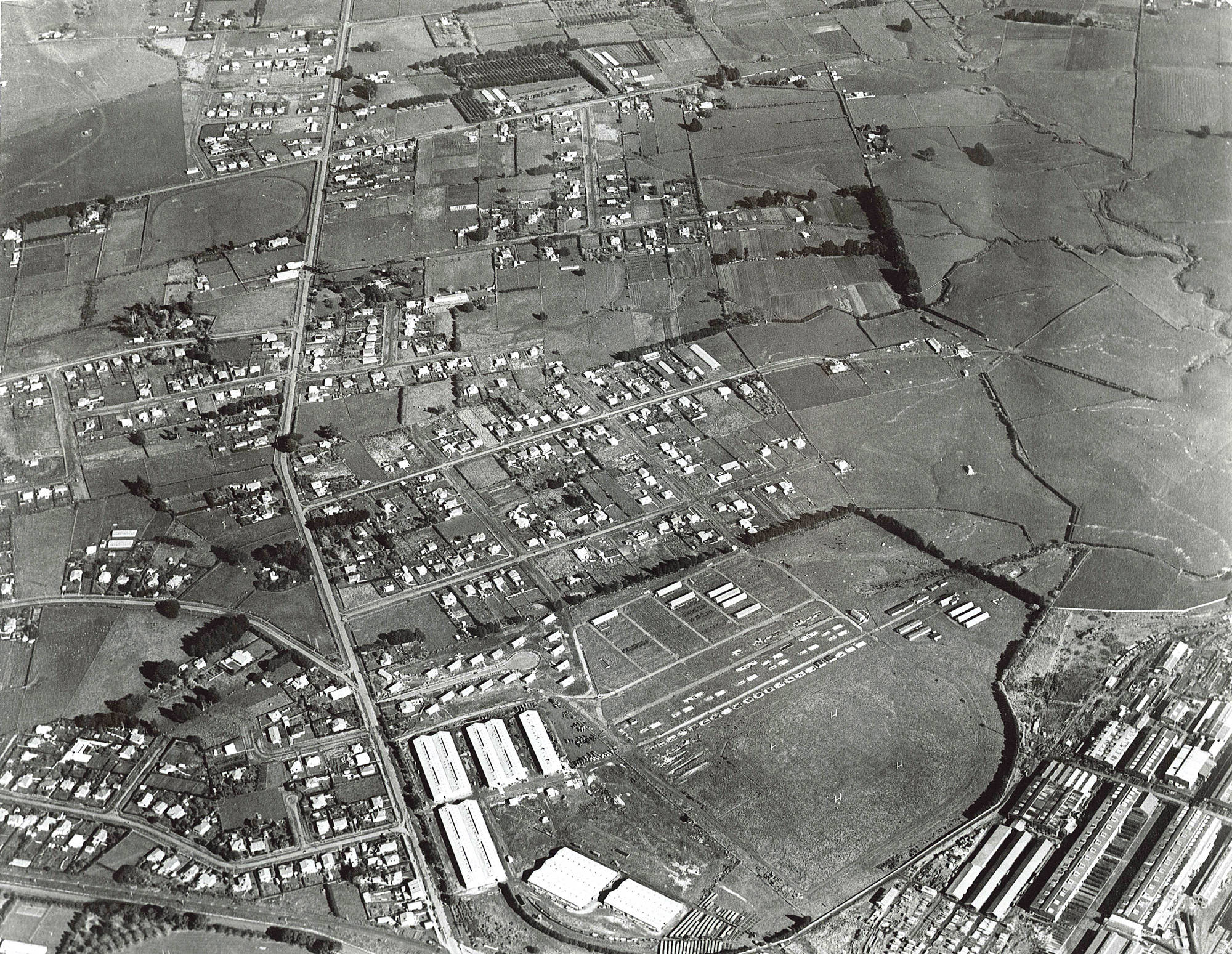
Aerial view of Māngere East in 1949, showing the former Camp Euart and the Otahuhu Workshops

The first evidence of Tāmaki Māori in the coastal Māngere area comes from the 14th century, with evidence of the first settlements later in the 15th century. The Māngere East area formed an important part of the Waokauri / Pūkaki portage, connecting the Manukau Harbour and Tāmaki River via Papatoetoe, and was often used by Tāmaki Māori to avoid the Te Tō Waka and Karetu portages, controlled by the people who lived at Ōtāhuhu / Mount Richmond. The area is within the rohe of the Waiohua tribes, including Te Ākitai Waiohua.

In January 1836 missionary William Thomas Fairburn brokered a land sale between Tāmaki Māori chiefs, Pōtatau Te Wherowhero and Turia of Ngāti Te Rau, covering the majority of modern-day South Auckland between Ōtāhuhu and Papakura. The sale was envisioned as a way to end hostilities in the area, but it is unclear what the chiefs understood or consented to. Māori continued to live in South Auckland, unchanged by this sale. Fairburn was criticised for the sheer size of the purchase, and in 1842 the Crown significantly reduced the size of his land holdings, and the Crown partitioned much of the land for European settlers. Until the 1860s, the Māori population of the Manukau Harbour and Waikato areas produced goods to sell or barter at the port of Onehunga. On 9 July 1863, due to fears of the Māori King Movement, Governor Grey proclaimed that all Māori living in the South Auckland area needed to swear loyalty to the Queen and give up their weapons. Most people refused due to strong links to Tainui, leaving for the south before the Government's Invasion of the Waikato. In 1862, the first local government was established in the area, with the formation of the Mangerei Highway Board.

The Māngere East area was predominantly rural, featuring a number of country villas (such as the Massey Homestead, former home of Prime Minister William Massey). Māngere East and Ōtāhuhu began slowly developing after the North Island Main Trunk linked Auckland to Wellington in 1908, and the Māngere railway station opened around the same time.

Māngere East began to develop as a suburban area after the opening of the Otahuhu Railway Workshops in the late 1920s. One of the first suburban developments was the Massey Park subdivision, which was built at the corner of Henwood Road and Massey Road. The Mangere East Hall opened in 1924, serving as a community area and cinema. Mangere East School opened in 1927, and in 1927 a Selwyn church was relocated to Māngere East from Ōtāhuhu.

During World War II, Māngere East became home to Camp Euart, an 84-acre military camp for the United States Military which housed 5,000 troops.

By 1955, the area had grown enough that Māngere East was established as a town district. Ten years later, the Māngere East town district was absorbed into the newly established Manukau City. The greater area saw increased suburban growth in the 1960s and 1970s, when central Māngere was developed as a large-scale housing development, and Māngere East became a suburb of the Manukau City.

== Demographics ==
Māngere East, which includes Middlemore in the SA3 statistical area, covers 6.62 km^{2} (2.56 sq mi) and had an estimated population of 28,620 as of June 2025, with a population density of 4,330 people per km^{2}.

Historical population
Year	Pop.	±% p.a.
2006	24,594	—
2013	24,018	−0.34%
2018	25,992	+1.59%
2023	26,361	+0.28%
The 2006 population is for a larger area of 6.86 km^{2}. Source:

Māngere East had a population of 26,361 in the 2023 New Zealand census, an increase of 369 people (1.4%) since the 2018 census, and an increase of 2,343 people (9.8%) since the 2013 census. There were 12,951 males, 13,353 females and 60 people of other genders in 5,979 dwellings. 1.7% of people identified as LGBTIQ+. The median age was 30.1 years (compared with 38.1 years nationally). There were 6,540 people (24.8%) aged under 15 years, 6,600 (25.0%) aged 15 to 29, 10,806 (41.0%) aged 30 to 64, and 2,415 (9.2%) aged 65 or older.

People could identify as more than one ethnicity. The results were 11.8% European (Pākehā); 16.1% Māori; 66.9% Pasifika; 20.1% Asian; 0.6% Middle Eastern, Latin American and African New Zealanders (MELAA); and 0.5% other, which includes people giving their ethnicity as "New Zealander". English was spoken by 90.1%, Māori language by 4.6%, Samoan by 20.0%, and other languages by 28.1%. No language could be spoken by 2.7% (e.g. too young to talk). New Zealand Sign Language was known by 0.4%. The percentage of people born overseas was 42.0, compared with 28.8% nationally.

Religious affiliations were 60.5% Christian, 6.0% Hindu, 5.5% Islam, 1.8% Māori religious beliefs, 1.1% Buddhist, 0.1% New Age, and 1.0% other religions. People who answered that they had no religion were 16.9%, and 7.2% of people did not answer the census question.

Of those at least 15 years old, 2,196 (11.1%) people had a bachelor's or higher degree, 9,660 (48.7%) had a post-high school certificate or diploma, and 7,971 (40.2%) people exclusively held high school qualifications. The median income was $33,300, compared with $41,500 nationally. 711 people (3.6%) earned over $100,000 compared to 12.1% nationally. The employment status of those at least 15 was that 9,618 (48.5%) people were employed full-time, 1,716 (8.7%) were part-time, and 1,050 (5.3%) were unemployed.

Individual statistical areas
Name	Area (km^{2})	Population	Density (per km^{2})	Dwellings	Median age	Median income
Harania North	0.94	3,900	4,149	747	27.1 years	$28,000
Sutton Park	0.73	3,741	5,125	750	28.3 years	$31,000
Harania South	0.78	3,540	4,538	801	28.7 years	$29,500
Massey Road West	0.69	3,699	5,361	951	31.7 years	$31,500
Massey Road North	0.84	3,255	3,875	882	31.8 years	$37,600
Massey Road South	0.32	1,857	5,803	405	28.7 years	$36,000
Middlemore	0.72	138	192	—	49.3 years	$33,300
Aorere North	0.33	1,425	4,318	345	30.5 years	$37,800
Māngere East	0.64	2,637	4,105	603	32.4 years	$37,800
Aorere Central	0.62	2,163	3,489	495	31.4 years	$37,500
New Zealand					38.1 years	$41,500

== Education ==
Kedgley Intermediate School is an intermediate school (years 7–8) with a roll of 736.

Robertson Road School, Mangere East and Sutton Park School are full primary schools (years 1–8) with rolls of 508, 565 and 532 students, respectively.

Kingsford and Papatoetoe North schools are contributing primary schools (years 1–6) with rolls of 307 and 754 students, respectively.

St Mary MacKillop Catholic School is a state-integrated full primary school (years 1–8) with a roll of 328.

De La Salle College is a state-integrated boys' Catholic secondary school (years 7–13) with a roll of 977.

All these schools except De La Salle are coeducational. Rolls are as of July 2025.

== Local government ==
The first local government in the area was the Mangerei Highway Board, which formed in 1862. Māngere for the 19th and early 20th Centuries, Māngere was a rural area within the Manukau County. Māngere East was established as a town districts in 1955. In 1965, the area became a part of the Manukau City, In November 2010, all cities and districts of the Auckland Region were amalgamated into a single body, governed by the Auckland Council.

Māngere East is primarily part of the Māngere-Ōtāhuhu local board area, who elects members of the Māngere-Ōtāhuhu Local Board. Some areas of Māngere East south-east of Walter Massey Park and Aorere Park are a part of the Ōtara-Papatoetoe, who elect members to the Ōtara-Papatoetoe Local Board. Residents of Māngere East, regardless of local board, also elect two Manukau ward councillors to sit on the Auckland Council.

== Community facilities ==
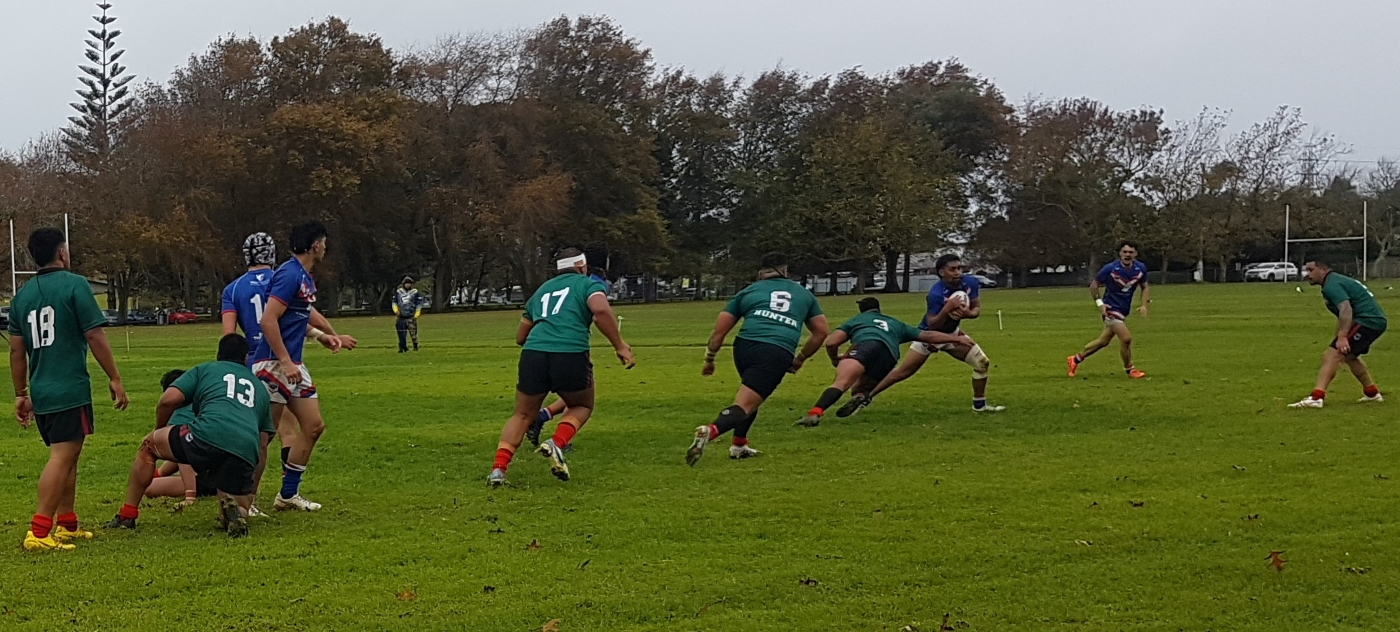
Mangere East Hawks v. Te Atatu Roosters rugby league match at Walter Massey Park (2023)

- Tri Duc Temple, a Vietnamese Buddhist temple is located in the suburb.
- Walter Massey Park, a public park in Māngere East. The park is home to the association football club Manukau United FC, the rugby league club Mangere East Hawks, Māngere East Library, the historic Māngere East Hall and the Māngere East Community Centre.

== Notable people ==
- William Massey – Prime Minister of New Zealand (1912–1925)
- Tupou Neiufi – Commonwealth Games and Paralympics athlete

== Bibliography ==
- Mackintosh, Lucy (2021). Shifting Grounds: Deep Histories of Tāmaki Makaurau Auckland. Bridget Williams Books. doi:10.7810/9781988587332. ISBN 978-1-988587-33-2.
- Wichman, Gwen (1990), A brief history of Manurewa, Manurewa: Manurewa Historical Society, Wikidata Q117327773
