= Ōtāhuhu =

- Suburb
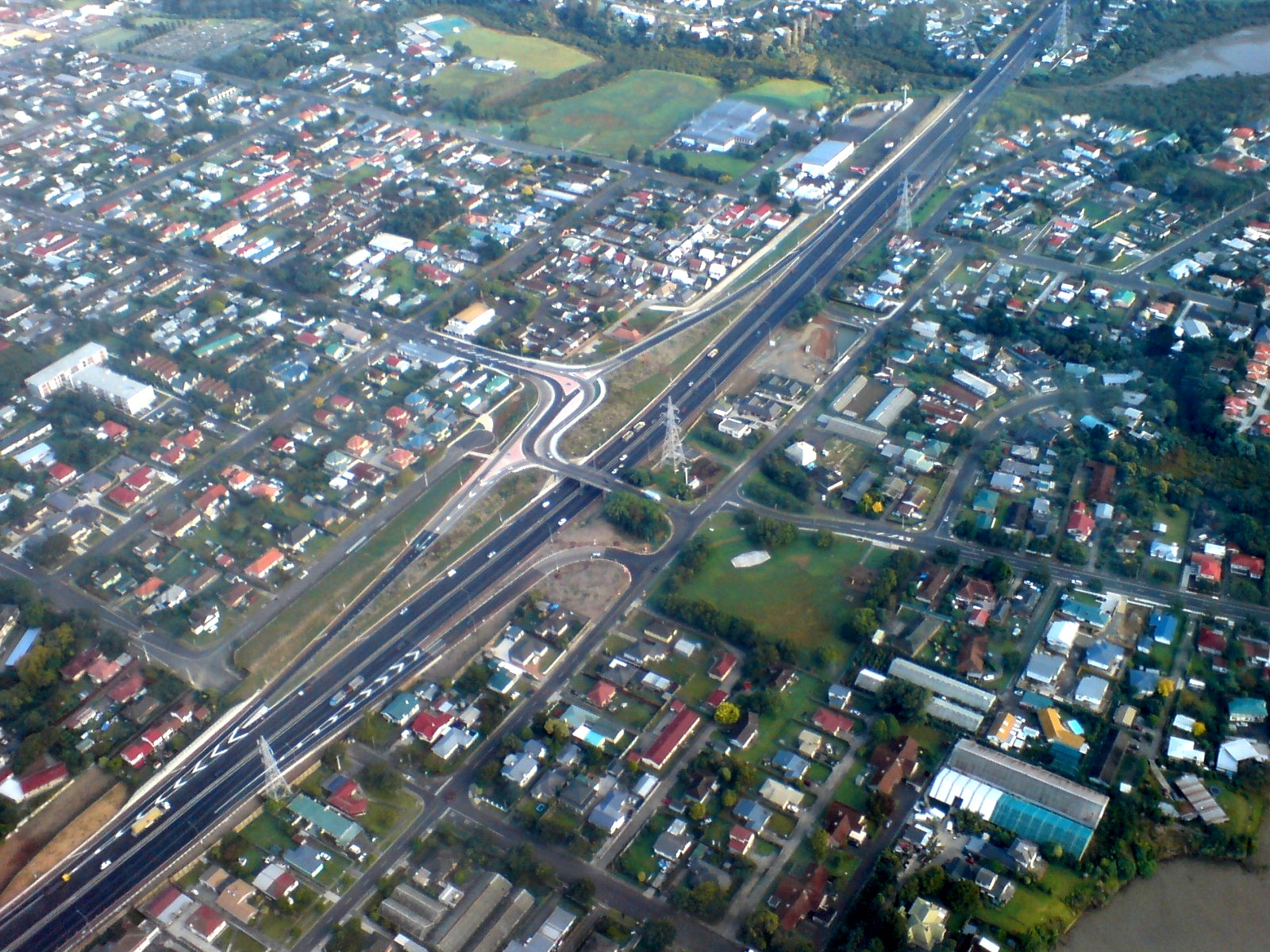
- Part of eastern Ōtāhuhu from the air, 2007
- Interactive map of Ōtāhuhu
- Coordinates: 36°56′43″S 174°50′42″E
- Country: New Zealand
- City: Auckland
- Local authority: Auckland Council
- Electoral ward: Manukau ward
- Local board: Māngere-Ōtāhuhu Local Board

Area
  - Land: 668 ha (1,650 acres)

Population (June 2025)
  - Total: 16,600
  - Density: 2,490/km^{2} (6,440/sq mi)
- Train stations: Ōtāhuhu railway station

Westfield	Mount Wellington	(Tāmaki River), Pakuranga
(Māngere Inlet)	Ōtāhuhu	(Tāmaki River), East Tāmaki
Favona, Māngere East	Middlemore

Ōtāhuhu is a suburb of Auckland, New Zealand – 13 kilometres (8.1 mi) to the southeast of the CBD, on a narrow isthmus between an arm of the Manukau Harbour to the west and the Tāmaki River estuary to the east. The Auckland isthmus is the narrowest connection between the North Auckland Peninsula and the rest of the North Island, being only some 1,200 metres (3,900 ft) wide at its narrowest point, between the Ōtāhuhu Creek and the Māngere Inlet. As the southernmost suburb of the former Auckland City, it is considered part of South Auckland.

The suburb's name is taken from the Māori-language name of the volcanic cone known as Ōtāhuhu / Mount Richmond. The name refers to "the place of Tāhuhu" — the eponymous ancestor, Tāhuhu-nui-a-Rangi, of Ngāi Tāhuhu.

== Demographics ==
Ōtāhuhu covers 6.68 km^{2} (2.58 sq mi) and had an estimated population of 16,600 as of June 2025, with a population density of 2,485 inhabitants per square kilometre (6,440/sq mi).

Historical population
Year	Pop.	±% p.a.
2006	12,903	—
2013	13,566	+0.72%
2018	15,162	+2.25%
2023	14,778	−0.51%

Ōtāhuhu had a population of 14,778 in the 2023 New Zealand census, a decrease of 384 people (−2.5%) since the 2018 census, and an increase of 1,212 people (8.9%) since the 2013 census. There were 7,719 males, 7,017 females and 45 people of other genders in 4,374 dwellings. 2.8% of people identified as LGBTIQ+. The median age was 32.6 years (compared with 38.1 years nationally). There were 3,147 people (21.3%) aged under 15 years, 3,540 (24.0%) aged 15 to 29, 6,669 (45.1%) aged 30 to 64, and 1,419 (9.6%) aged 65 or older.

People could identify as more than one ethnicity. The results were 19.7% European (Pākehā); 16.7% Māori; 49.6% Pasifika; 27.6% Asian; 1.6% Middle Eastern, Latin American and African New Zealanders (MELAA); and 0.7% other, which includes people giving their ethnicity as "New Zealander". English was spoken by 89.0%, Māori language by 4.6%, Samoan by 14.6%, and other languages by 30.4%. No language could be spoken by 2.9% (e.g. too young to talk). New Zealand Sign Language was known by 0.5%. The percentage of people born overseas was 45.9, compared with 28.8% nationally.

Religious affiliations were 51.1% Christian, 7.1% Hindu, 6.4% Islam, 1.9% Māori religious beliefs, 2.5% Buddhist, 0.2% New Age, and 1.7% other religions. People who answered that they had no religion were 23.2%, and 6.1% of people did not answer the census question.

Of those at least 15 years old, 1,680 (14.4%) people had a bachelor's or higher degree, 5,148 (44.3%) had a post-high school certificate or diploma, and 4,803 (41.3%) people exclusively held high school qualifications. The median income was $33,800, compared with $41,500 nationally. 612 people (5.3%) earned over $100,000 compared to 12.1% nationally. The employment status of those at least 15 was that 5,757 (49.5%) people were employed full-time, 984 (8.5%) were part-time, and 606 (5.2%) were unemployed.

Individual statistical areas
Name	Area (km^{2})	Population	Density (per km^{2})	Dwellings	Median age	Median income
Ōtāhuhu Industrial	1.83	153	84	—	18.9 years	—
Ōtāhuhu Central	1.25	1,209	967	369	37.3 years	$32,300
Ōtāhuhu North West	0.38	2,244	5,905	660	30.6 years	$30,100
Ōtāhuhu North East	0.36	1,902	5,283	588	31.0 years	$33,200
Ōtāhuhu East	0.79	2,304	2,916	654	32.8 years	$40,800
Ōtāhuhu South West	1.24	3,372	2,719	951	33.2 years	$34,800
Ōtāhuhu South	0.82	3,600	4,390	1,149	33.4 years	$33,700
New Zealand					38.1 years	$41,500

== History ==
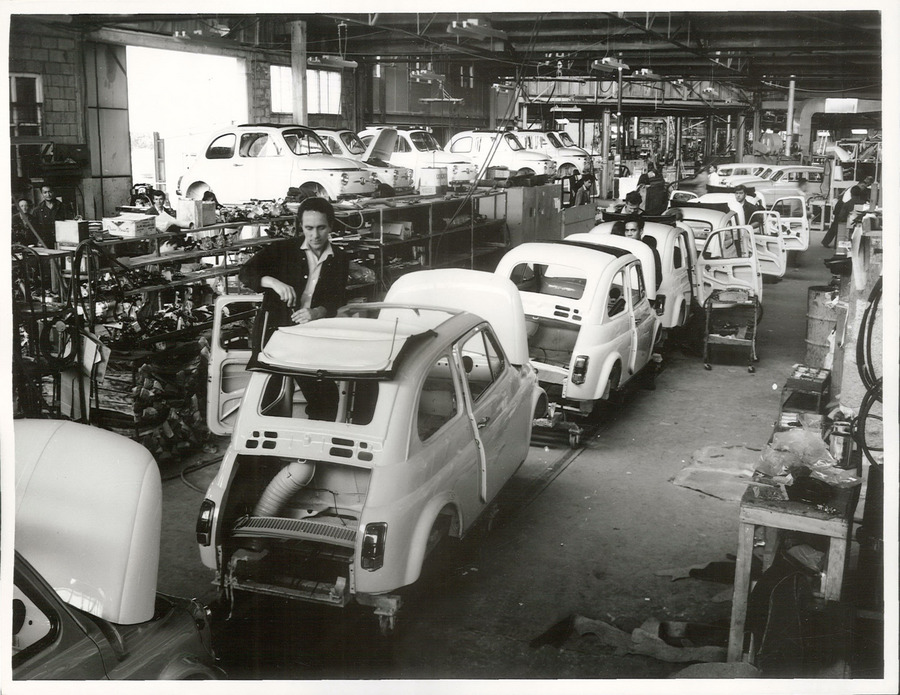
An assembler at the Fiats Assembly Works, Ōtāhuhu (1966)

The area is named after Tāhuhunui-o-te-rangi, captain of the Moekākara waka, and who settled on Ōtāhuhu and in Northland, his descendants becoming the Ngāi Tāhuhu iwi.

Portage Road, which runs between the Manukau Harbour and Ōtāhuhu Creek, was originally Te Tō Waka, a portage for waka between the Manukau and Waitemata harbours. This portage is traditionally associated as the place where the Tainui waka was hauled between the Tamaki River and Manukau Harbour. In the early 1800s, the portage was used by Ngāpuhi during the Musket Wars, to attack Tainui tribes in the Waikato. As early as 1850 there were proposals to create a canal along the route, and a strip of land was reserved for this purpose; this was re-visited from time to time, but the canal was not constructed.

Ōtāhuhu was established in 1848 with the arrival of the ship Ann as a fencible settlement, where soldiers were granted land with the implied understanding that in wartime, they would be raised as units to defend it (the eventual fighting in July 1863 well over a decade later used professional soldiers instead). All features excluding the street layout we see today from this time have disappeared such as the stone Tāmaki Bridge built by the fencibles that had to make way to a widening of Great South Road.

Great South Road is one of the earliest roads in the region. Surveying and construction commenced in 1843; by 1851 the road had been metalled as far as Ōtāhuhu. The first section of the Auckland to Drury Railway was opened in 1873, connecting the township of Auckland to Penrose. The Otahuhu station was opened on 20 May 1875.

By the 1870s, Ōtāhuhu became the largest agricultural town in the Auckland Province, facilitated by the trade of wheat and other agricultural products to the city of Auckland, trading along the Tāmaki River.

During World War II fortifications were constructed in case of Japanese Invasion. Anti-tank measures included concrete barriers on Great South Road and extensive ditches. Pillboxes were erected adjacent to Favona Road and in Sturges Park. Camp Euart was established nearby, housing 5000 American troops at its peak; this had positive economic effects on Ōtāhuhu.

The first supermarket in the country was opened at present day 628 Great South Road, Ōtāhuhu on 18 June 1958, when the first Foodtown was opened by Tom Ah Chee, who pooled his resources with two other Auckland produce shop owners Norman Kent and John Brown.

== Local government ==
The Otahuhu Borough Council was formed in 1912 from the earlier Otahuhu Road District, which had been formed in 1865. The Otahuhu Borough Council merged with Mt Wellington Borough Council into Tamaki City in 1986 which was a short lived affair. Further amalgamations of Otahuhu's local government affairs resulted them moving into Auckland City Council in 1990 and eventually amalgamated into Auckland Council in November 2010, where it has been part of the Mangere-Otahuhu Local Board area jurisdiction since 2010.

=== Mayors during Otahuhu Borough Council ===
- Alfred Sturges, 1912–1915
- James Atkinson, 1915–1917
- Alfred MacDonald, 1917–1921
- Robert Black Todd, 1921–1929
- Hubert Thomas Clements, 1929–1935
- Charles Robert Petrie, 1935–1944
- Albert Murdoch, 1944–1950
- James Deas, 1950–1954
- John "Jack" David Murdoch, 1954–1962
- Robert G. Ashby, 1962–1965
- Aubray Thayer Bedingfield, 1965–1970
- Claude H. D. Handisides, 1970–1977
- Niall Frederick Burgess, 1977–1985

== Education ==
- Otahuhu College is a secondary school (years 9–13) with a roll of 1,151.
- Otahuhu Intermediate is an intermediate school (years 7–8) with a roll of 375.
- Otahuhu School and Fairburn School are contributing primary schools (years 1–6) with rolls of 550 and 436 students, respectively.
- McAuley High School is a state-integrated Catholic girls secondary school (years 9–13) with a roll of 770. St Joseph's School is a state-integrated Catholic full primary school (years 1–8) with a roll of 269. The schools are across the street from each other.
- King's College is a private Anglican secondary school (years 9–13) with a roll of 1,233. Years 9–11 are boys only, and years 12 and 13 are coeducational.
- Mt Richmond School is a special school for students with intellectual disabilities. It has a roll of 204.

All these schools are coeducational, except McAuley High School and King's College (as noted above). Rolls are as of July 2026.

== Community facilities ==
- Giac Nhien Temple, a Vietnamese Buddhist temple is located in the suburb.

== Transport ==
Ōtāhuhu, in its position on a narrow section of the Auckland isthmus, is an important part of Auckland's southern transportation approaches for both road and rail, containing a combined bus interchange and Ōtāhuhu railway station. The new bus-train interchange opened on 29 October 2016 as a joint Auckland Transport and NZ Transport Agency initiative costing NZ$28M.

"The station is at the heart of the Southern New Network", said Auckland Transport's Chief AT Metro Officer, Mark Lambert. "Auckland is moving towards a more connected network of local feeder services connecting with frequent bus and train services. Bus and train transport hubs like Ōtāhuhu are at the heart of this transformation."

The old bus interchange, which was badly neglected, and had received increased attention from early 2011 on for vandalism/graffiti prevention measures is now closed and a smaller bus stop has been installed on the main road near the town centre.

== Sport and recreation ==
Ōtāhuhu is home to the Ōtāhuhu Rugby Football Club and the Otahuhu Leopards rugby league club.

== Notable people ==
- Bruce Cathie (1930-2013), National Airways Corporation pilot and ufologist
- Efeso Collins (1974-2024), politician. Last residences were in Otahuhu
- David Lange (1942-2005), lawyer, MP and former Prime Minister of New Zealand. Grew up in Otahuhu.
- Many famous personalities went to Otahuhu College, including heavyweight boxing champion David Tua, former prime minister David Lange, and ex-Manukau City Mayor, Sir Barry Curtis.
