= Te Papapa =

- Suburb
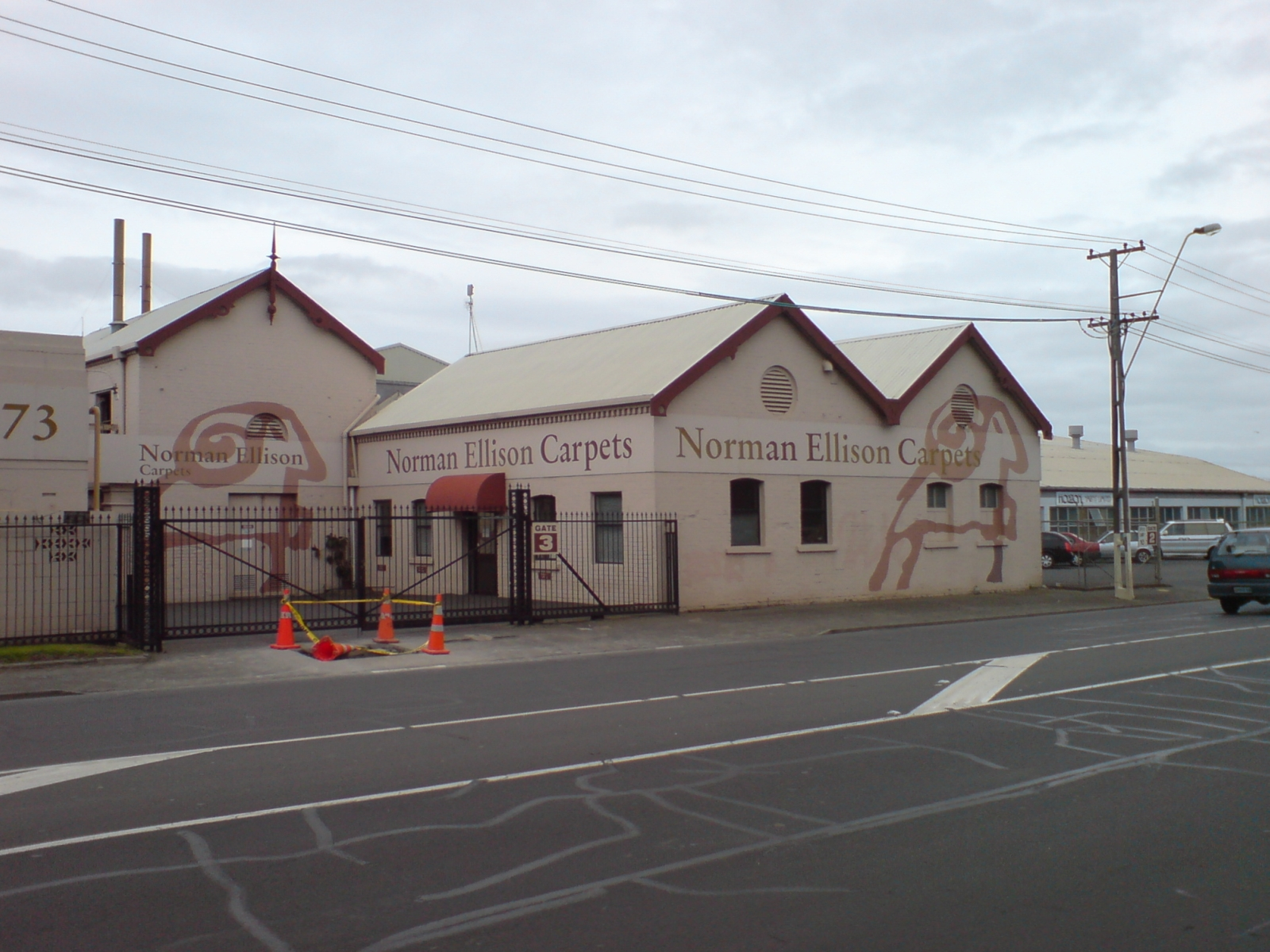
- A carpet factory in the south of the suburb
- Interactive map of Te Papapa
- Coordinates: 36°55′11″S 174°48′08″E
- Country: New Zealand
- City: Auckland
- Local authority: Auckland Council
- Electoral ward: Maungakiekie-Tāmaki ward
- Local board: Maungakiekie-Tāmaki Local Board
- Board subdivision: Maungakiekie

Area
  - Land: 71 ha (180 acres)

Population (June 2025)
  - Total: 3,450
  - Density: 4,900/km^{2} (13,000/sq mi)
- Train stations: Te Papapa railway station

Oranga	Penrose	Mount Wellington
Onehunga	Te Papapa	Southdown
Māngere Bridge	(Māngere Inlet)

Te Papapa is a suburb of Auckland, New Zealand. It is located nine kilometres to the southeast of Auckland city centre, on the northern shore of Māngere Inlet, an arm of the Manukau Harbour. The residential and light-industrial suburb lies between the suburbs of Onehunga, Penrose, and Southdown, and is at the northern end of the Māngere Bridge which connects it with the South Auckland suburb of Māngere. Train services on the Onehunga West Line run through the suburb on the Onehunga Branch line, which reopened in 2010. Services at Te Papapa station commenced on 19 September 2010. Carter Holt Harvey's head office is located at 173 Captain Springs Road in the Te Papapa area.

== Etymology ==
It has been suggested that the name of the suburb refers to a fortress built of rock slabs. However, when Te Papapa Railway Station first opened in 1879, the area around was commonly known as "Pumpkin Flat" and a short article in the Auckland Star reported that the general manager of the railways had chosen to name the station after the "Maori long pumpkin or Te Papapa" (pāpapa) in remembrance of the commonly used name.

== Demographics ==
Te Papapa covers 0.71 km^{2} (0.27 sq mi) and had an estimated population of 3,450 as of June 2025, with a population density of 4,859 people per km^{2}.

Historical population
Year	Pop.	±% p.a.
2006	2,877	—
2013	3,060	+0.88%
2018	3,237	+1.13%
2023	3,150	−0.54%

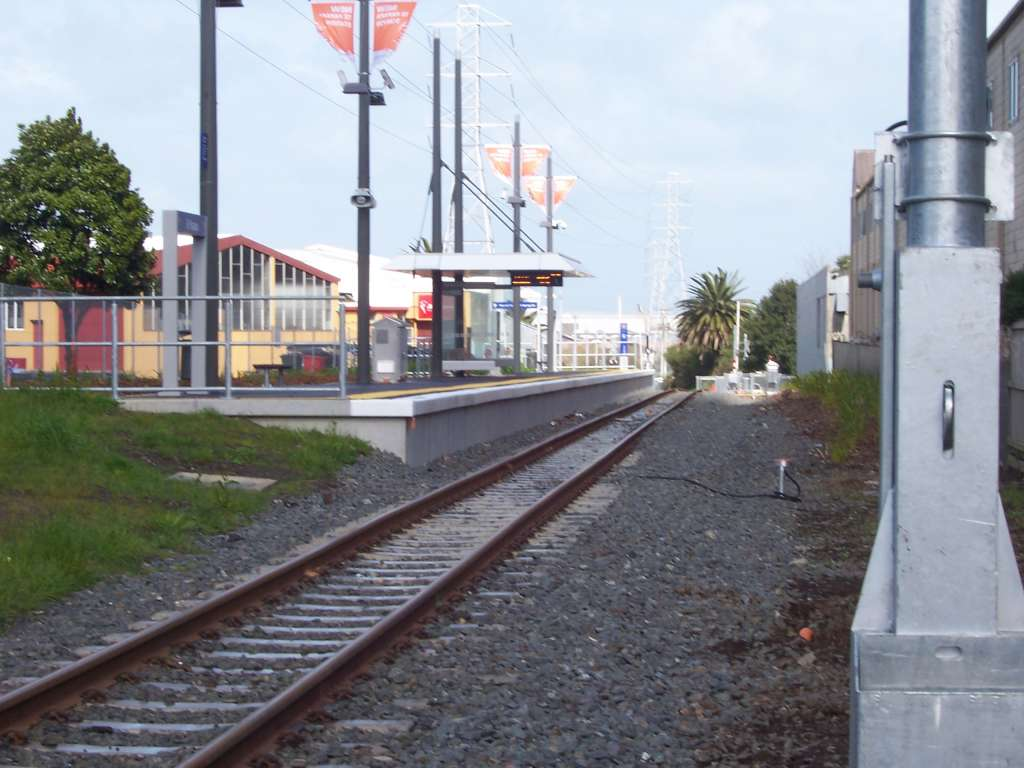
Te Papapa Station

Te Papapa had a population of 3,150 in the 2023 New Zealand census, a decrease of 87 people (−2.7%) since the 2018 census, and an increase of 90 people (2.9%) since the 2013 census. There were 1,557 males, 1,578 females and 15 people of other genders in 1,086 dwellings. 4.4% of people identified as LGBTIQ+. The median age was 34.6 years (compared with 38.1 years nationally). There were 597 people (19.0%) aged under 15 years, 672 (21.3%) aged 15 to 29, 1,605 (51.0%) aged 30 to 64, and 273 (8.7%) aged 65 or older.

People could identify as more than one ethnicity. The results were 53.0% European (Pākehā); 12.3% Māori; 23.6% Pasifika; 23.7% Asian; 3.3% Middle Eastern, Latin American and African New Zealanders (MELAA); and 1.3% other, which includes people giving their ethnicity as "New Zealander". English was spoken by 93.0%, Māori language by 2.7%, Samoan by 3.9%, and other languages by 27.8%. No language could be spoken by 3.0% (e.g. too young to talk). New Zealand Sign Language was known by 0.3%. The percentage of people born overseas was 37.8, compared with 28.8% nationally.

Religious affiliations were 41.6% Christian, 3.4% Hindu, 2.6% Islam, 0.6% Māori religious beliefs, 1.0% Buddhist, 0.2% New Age, 0.2% Jewish, and 1.4% other religions. People who answered that they had no religion were 44.6%, and 4.5% of people did not answer the census question.

Of those at least 15 years old, 942 (36.9%) people had a bachelor's or higher degree, 1,008 (39.5%) had a post-high school certificate or diploma, and 609 (23.9%) people exclusively held high school qualifications. The median income was $54,800, compared with $41,500 nationally. 504 people (19.7%) earned over $100,000 compared to 12.1% nationally. The employment status of those at least 15 was that 1,587 (62.2%) people were employed full-time, 237 (9.3%) were part-time, and 78 (3.1%) were unemployed.

== Education ==
Te Papapa School is a coeducational contributing primary school (years 1–6) with a roll of 310 as of July 2026.
