= Port of Tauranga =

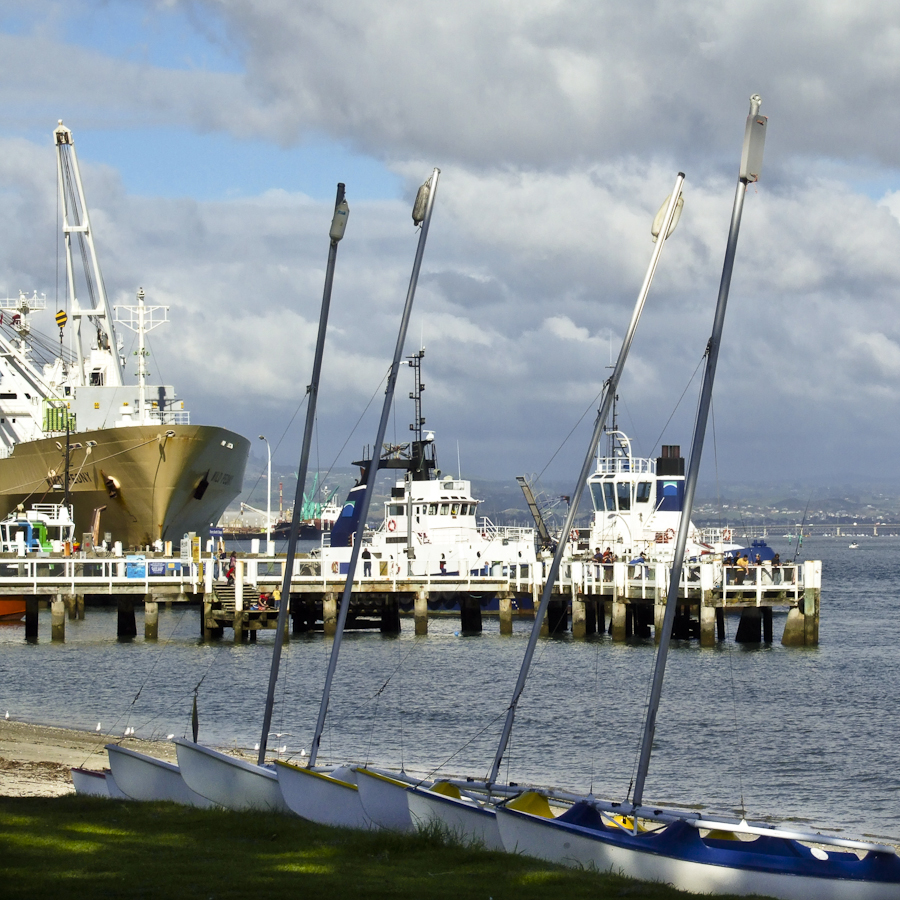
- View of the port from Pilot Bay
- Interactive map of Port of Tauranga
- Location within New Zealand

Location
- Country: New Zealand
- Location: Tauranga, New Zealand
- Coordinates: 37.661384°S 176.172659°E
- UN/LOCODE: NZBOP

Details
- Opened: 1988 (38 years ago)
- Type of Harbor: Port
- No. of berths: 15
- No. of wharfs: 2
- Draft depth: 14.5 m (48 ft)
- Rail lines: East Coast Main Trunk; Mount Maunganui Branch
- Rail gauge: 1,067 mm (3 ft 6 in)

Statistics
- Annual TEU: 1.2 million (2025)
- Annual revenue: NZ$464.7 million (2025)
- Net income: NZ$173.3 million (2025)
- Website port-tauranga.co.nz

Port of Tauranga Limited
- Trade name: Port of Tauranga
- Formerly: Bay of Plenty Harbour Board (Disestablished 1988)
- ISIN: NZPOTE0003S0
- Industry: Port
- Founded: 25 July 1988 in Tauranga, New Zealand
- Headquarters: Tauranga, New Zealand
- Key people: Leonard Sampson (CEO); David Pilkington (Chairman); Alison Andrew (Director); Kim Ellis (Director); Julia Hoare (Director); Alastair Lawrence (Director); Doug Leeder (Chairman BOP Regional Council); Sir Robert McLeod (Chairman Quayside Holdings)
- Owners: Bay Of Plenty Regional Council – 54%; Public - 46%
- Number of employees: 229 (2019)
- Subsidiaries: Coda GP Limited; Metrobox Limited; Northport; North Tugz Limited; Port Connect Limited; PrimePort Timaru Limited; Quality Marshalling; Tapper Transport; Timaru Container Terminal Limited

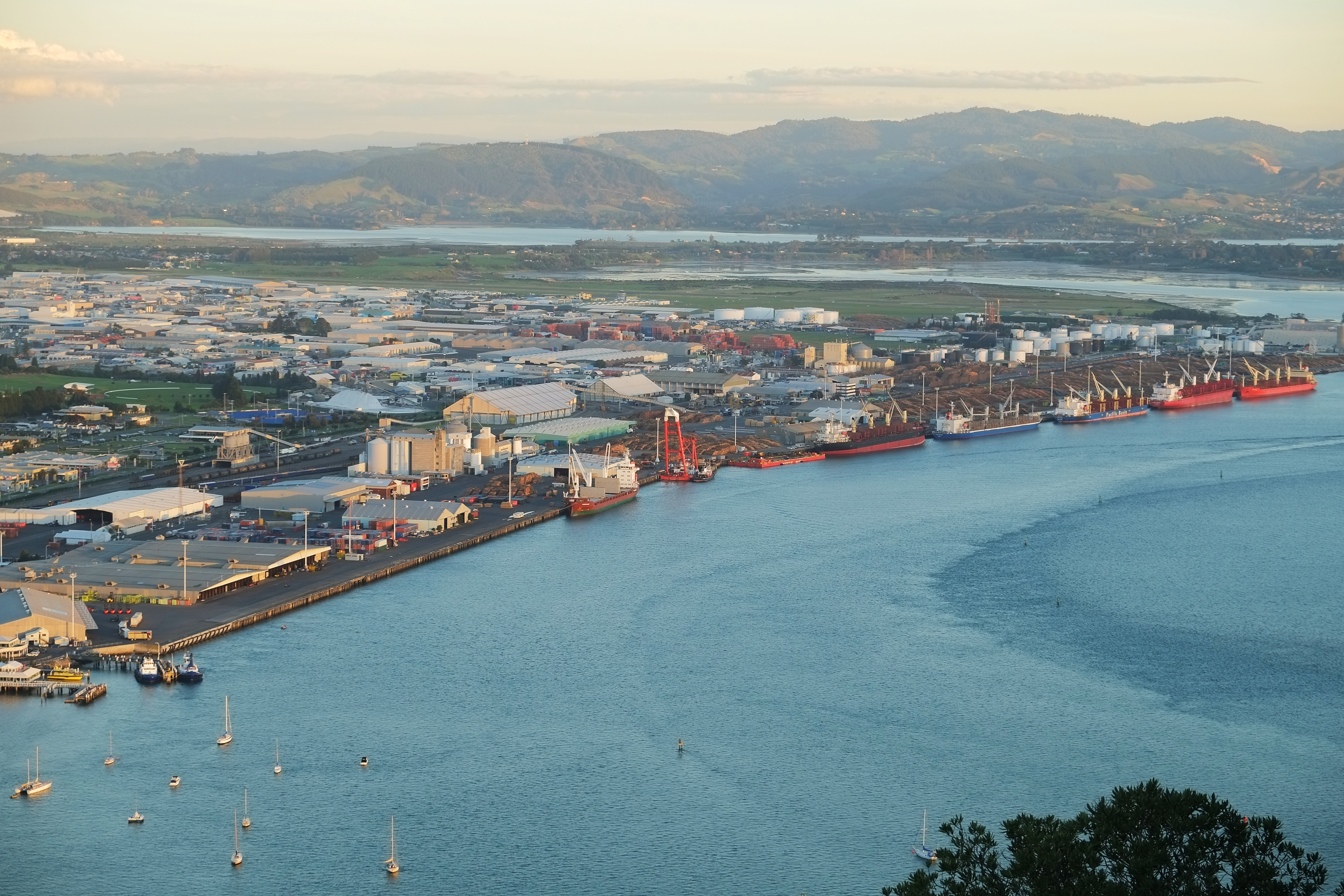
Eastern port facilities (general freight areas), seen from Mount Maunganui.

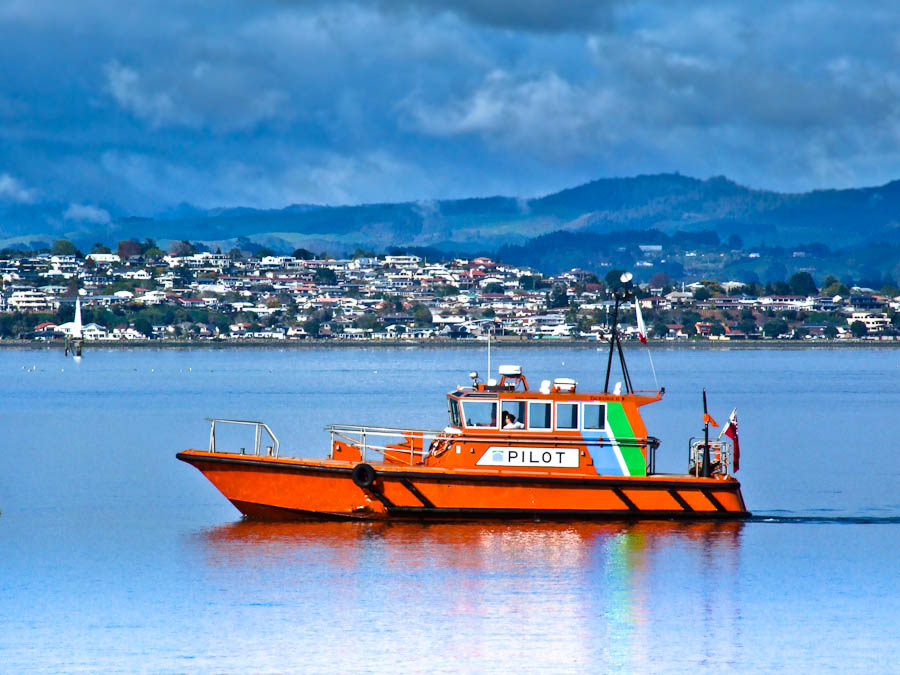
Pilot boat from the port of Tauranga

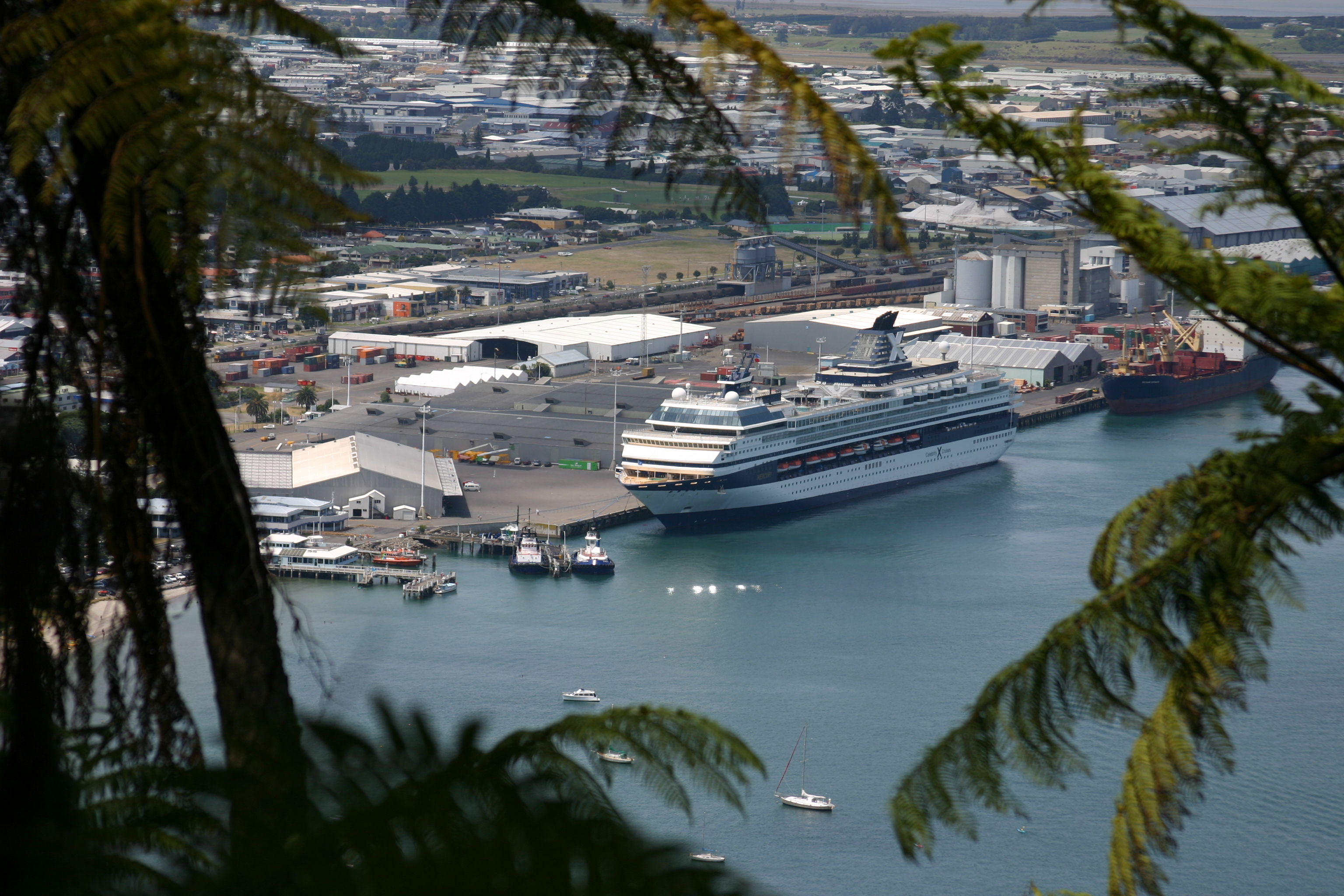
A cruise ship docked in the port.

The Port of Tauranga is situated in Tauranga, New Zealand. It is the largest port in the country both in terms of total cargo volume, and in terms of container throughput with container volumes exceeding 1.2 million TEUs (Twenty Foot Equivalent Units). The port is operated by Port of Tauranga Ltd (NZX: POT).

The port is located in a natural harbour protected by Mount Maunganui and Matakana Island, and is the only natural harbour between Auckland and Wellington offering good shelter in all weather. As of June 2021, Port of Tauranga Ltd employs approximately 270 people.

== History ==
The first wharf was constructed in the 1860s, before which shipping operations took place from the beach. Passenger steamer services were operated from the 1870s, being discontinued in 1929 following the construction of a rail link to Hamilton in 1928.

In September 1873, the Port of Tauranga was officially established by order of the Governor-General of New Zealand, Sir James Fergusson. The Lady Jocelyn of 2,138 tonnes was the first large sailing vessel recorded as entering the harbour, in 1882.

Various schemes were proposed for dredging and other improvements to navigation in the late 19th and early 20th centuries, but little was done.

A Tauranga Harbour Board (later the Bay of Plenty Harbour Board) was constituted to administer the affairs of the harbour in 1912, first meeting in 1913.

In 1927 the Railway Wharf was completed and used almost exclusively for coastal shipping until the visit of the James Cook in 1948 to load timber for Australia. Timber subsequently became and remains a mainstay of cargoes out of the port.

Construction of the Mount Maunganui wharf started in 1953 and the first ship, the MV Korowai berthed at the new wharf on 5 December 1954.

In 1960 the port's first tug, the Mount Maunganui was commissioned. In 1967, the port handled its first shipping container. In 1972 the Port Caroline, then the world's largest conventional refrigerated cargo liner, visited the port for the first time.

The opening of the Kaimai rail tunnel by Sir Rob Muldoon in 1978 substantially reduced travelling times between the port and the rest of New Zealand.

In 1988, as a consequence of Government port reform, the Bay of Plenty Harbour Board established Port of Tauranga Limited as its operating vehicle. In 1989, the Harbour Board was disestablished and ownership of shares in the port passed to The Bay of Plenty and Waikato Regional Councils. The Company is now public, with a diverse shareholding.

The port continued to develop and modernize during the 1990s and 2000s. A significant development in 1999 was the establishment of New Zealand's first fully integrated inland port service, MetroPort Auckland.

In 2000, the port entered a 50:50 joint-venture with Northland Port Corporation (NZ) Limited to develop and operate a deepwater port at Marsden Point near Whangārei.

The port was a joint winner of the 2004 Australasian Port of the Year Award run by Lloyd's List Daily Commercial News, the first time a New Zealand port had won a Lloyd's List award.

With the trend to larger cargo vessels making fewer port calls, Tauranga has increasingly become the only New Zealand, or only North Island, port serviced by international shipping lines, at the expense of ports in Auckland, Wellington, Lyttelton (Christchurch) and elsewhere. Lines include Maersk/Hamburg Sud, CMA CGM, ANL and Swires.

The port is now New Zealand's largest container terminal. Prior to the Covid-19 pandemic, it also hosted increasing numbers of cruise ships.

== Facilities ==
The port has a total of 15 berths, of which 12 are located on the Mount Maunganui side of the harbour (general cargo such as wood, coal handling facilities, bulk liquids), while another 3 are located at the Tauranga Container Terminal at Sulphur Point on the Tauranga CBD side. Port of Tauranga owns 190 hectares of land on both sides of Tauranga Harbour, with about 40 hectares still available for development.

The port has nine Liebherr container cranes and 53 straddle carriers servicing its container terminal at Sulphur Point, on the western side of the harbour. First opened in 1992, this facility features 770m of wharf and 38 hectares of paved container yard.

Port of Tauranga also operates an inland port in Southdown, Auckland. On the Mount Maunganui side of the harbour, the Port of Tauranga has 2,055m of linear (continuous) berth face. Immediately adjacent to the wharf are cargo sheds and a 20,000 tonne capacity coldstore. Spread along the wharf are 22 bunker points to allow ships to refuel while loading or unloading. To the south of the Mount Maunganui Wharf is the Tanker Berth:

The Tanker Berth was completed in 1980 and is dedicated to the transfer of dangerous goods in bulk. Activities include the discharging and/or loading of tankers carrying bulk fluids such as hydrocarbon oil products, chemicals and edible oils. The facility consists of a free standing wharf of 80 metres in length with dolphins at each end allowing for ships of up to 250 metres LOA to berth and pump ashore.

== Company ==
Port of Tauranga Ltd was established in 1985, and has also established MetroPort Auckland in June 1999, an inland port service. • Net Profit After Tax (NPAT) for the year to 30 June 2021 rose 15.4% to a new record of $102.4 million. Trading on the NZX as one of the 50 largest listed companies of New Zealand with a market capitalisation of $4.2 billion as of 9 May 2022.

Several times in the late 2000s, Port of Tauranga proposed to buy or merge with its rival Ports of Auckland (POAL). These approaches were rebuffed by POAL (which is owned by the Auckland Regional Council, rather than listed on the New Zealand Stock Exchange). In turn, Ports of Auckland proposed to buy only the container business of Ports of Tauranga, something which Port of Tauranga chairman John Parker argued would add little value.

In June 2021, Port of Tauranga's Chief Executive of 15 years, Mark Cairns, retired and was replaced by its Chief Operating Officer Leonard Sampson. The company's long-serving Chair, David Pilkington, retired in July 2022 and was succeeded by Julia Hoare.
