= Ellerslie station =

Ellerslie station may refer to:

- Ellerslie railway station in Auckland, New Zealand
- Heritage Valley Transit Centre in Edmonton, Alberta, Canada
