= Remuera railway station =

Train station in Auckland, New Zealand

Remuera
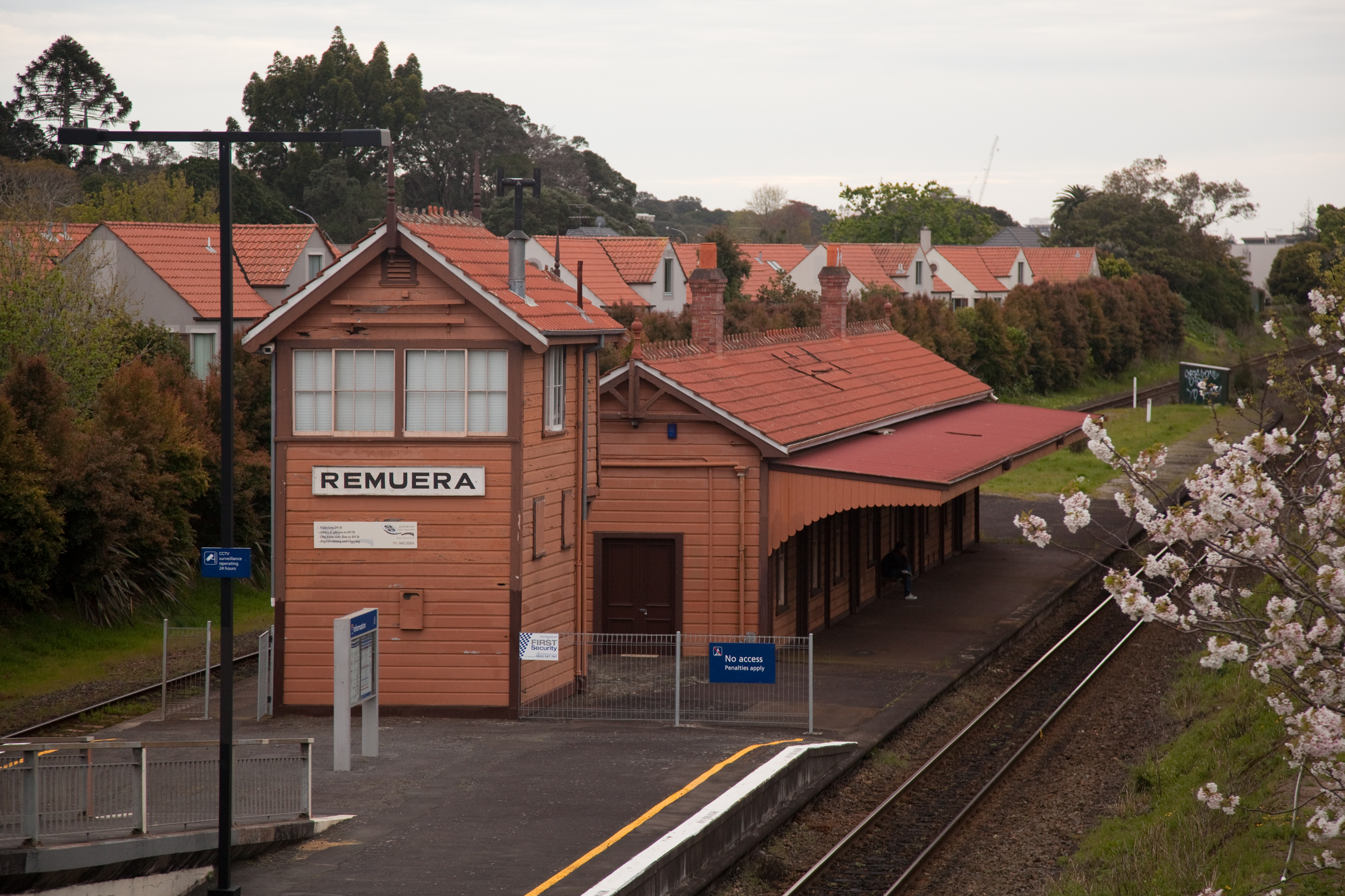
- Looking northwest prior to electrification.

General information
- Location: Remuera, Auckland; New Zealand
- Coordinates: 36°52.9′S 174°47.1′E
- System: Auckland Transport Urban rail
- Owner: KiwiRail (track and platforms); Auckland Transport (buildings)
- Operator: Auckland One Rail
- Line: North Auckland Line
- Distance: 6.92 km (4.30 mi) from Westfield Junction
- Platforms: Island platform (P1 & P2)
- Tracks: Mainline (2)

Construction
- Parking: No
- Cycle facilities: Yes
- Accessible: Step-free ramp from Market Road
- Architectural style: Troup Island Platform

Other information
- Fare zone: Isthmus
- Classification: RHTNZ Category A

History
- Opened: 20 December 1873
- Rebuilt: 1907
- Electrified: April 2014

Passengers
- 2018: 416 passengers/day

Services
Preceding station	Auckland Transport (Auckland One Rail)	Following station
Newmarket towards Henderson	Onehunga West Line	Greenlane towards Onehunga
Greenlane towards Pukekohe	South City Line	Newmarket towards Newmarket via Grafton
Former services
Preceding station	Auckland Transport (Auckland One Rail)	Following station
Newmarket Terminus	Onehunga Line pre-2026	Greenlane towards Onehunga
Newmarket towards Waitematā	Southern Line pre-2026	Greenlane towards Pukekohe

Heritage New Zealand – Category 1
- Designated: 3-Mar-1995
- Reference no.: 634
Location

Remuera railway station is a station serving the suburb of Remuera in Auckland, New Zealand. It is served by the South City line and the Onehunga West line, and consists of an island platform which is accessed by a ramp from the Market Road SH1 motorway overbridge. The station was opened in 1873 and is one of the oldest remaining island platform stations in New Zealand. It includes a weatherboard and tile station building, typical of those designed by George Troup.

== History ==
=== Original Station ===
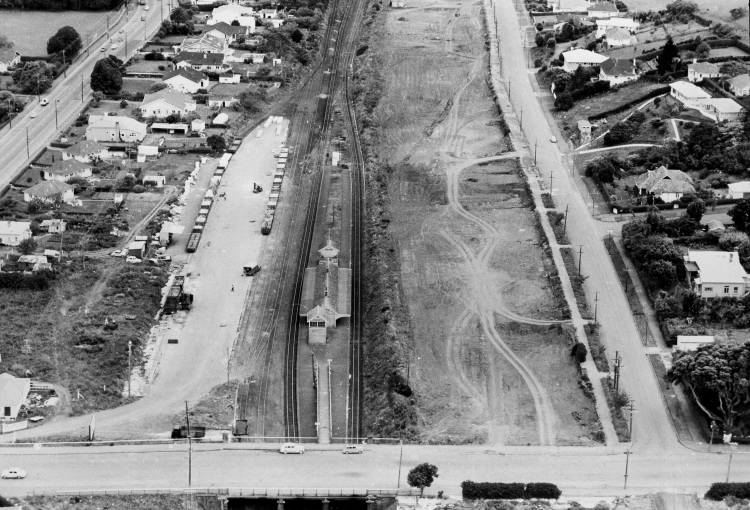
Aerial view of the Remuera Railway Station, 1964

Remuera station was first built in 1873 as a stop on the Auckland-Onehunga railway. By 1903, Remuera station was at its maximum capacity and the Minister for Railways, Sir Joseph Ward, acknowledged that better capacity was needed on the line. A double track line was built to Penrose Junction. The Auckland-Onehunga line was later extended to Hamilton. New island platforms were also built at Newmarket, Greenlane, Ellerslie and Penrose.

=== Rebuilt station ===
The current Remuera station was rebuilt and opened in November 1907 for £1,149 and a toilet block was added shortly after for £80, but was demolished in 1982.

The station saw a steady decline in freight and passengers and became unstaffed in 1942. In 1970, Alltrans built a large cargo depot. In 1979, the station was closed to all traffic, except for passengers and traffic to the private Alltrans sidings. These later closed in the early 1990s and apartments were built in its place.

==== Preservation ====
New Zealand Rail created a conservation plan for the station in 1992. In 1994, the Remuera Railway Station Preservation Trust (TRRSPT) was established to maintain and preserve the now dilapidated station buildings.

By 2007, the trust began major exterior restoration works, winning a restoration award from the Rail Heritage Trust of New Zealand. Despite this, the interior was untouched and further damaged in 2011 during electrification works.

==== Post Electrification ====
Between 2013 and 2014, Remuera station was electrified and the platforms were modified towards the southern end of the station to allow the AM Class EMU to operate. Currently, both platforms at Remuera station are open to all passengers, but remains unstaffed.

From 16 January 2023 to 19 March 2023, Remuera station closed to all traffic and had rail-bus replacements to allow Stage 1 of the Rail Network Rebuild to allow the opening of City Rail Link. Remuera station has remained open for Stage 3 of the Rail Network Rebuild, despite stations beyond Puhinui on the Southern Line being closed for refurbishment until March/April 2024.

== Services ==
Auckland One Rail, on behalf of Auckland Transport, operates suburban services on the South City line and Onehunga West line.

== See also ==
- Southern Line
- Onehunga Line
- List of Auckland railway stations
- Public Transport in Auckland
