= Ellerslie railway station =

Train station in Auckland, New Zealand

Ellerslie
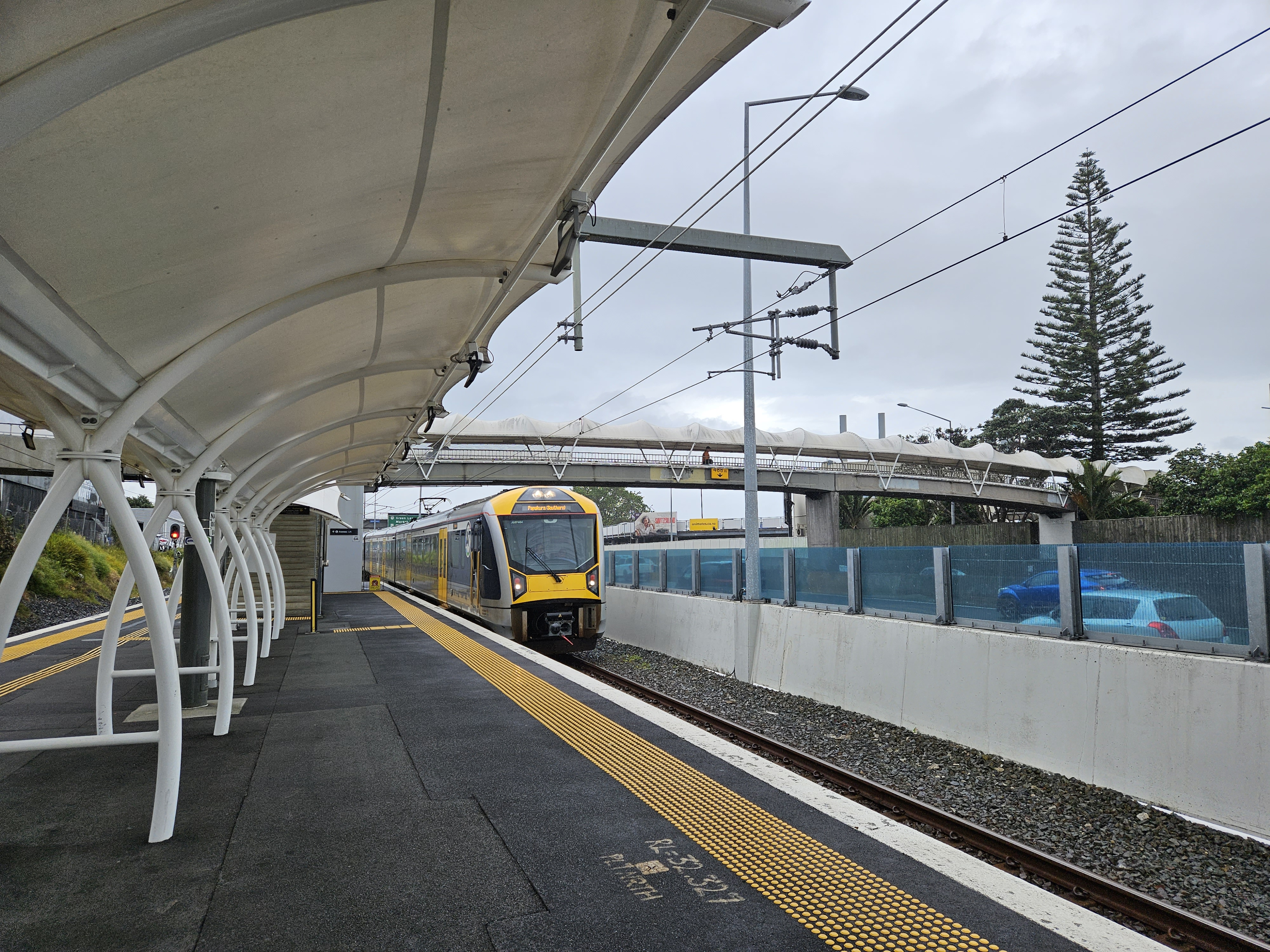
- Ellerslie railway station in 2023

General information
- Location: Ellerslie, Auckland; New Zealand
- Coordinates: 36.8983°S 174.8081°E
- Elevation: 31 m (102 ft)
- System: Auckland Transport Urban rail
- Owner: KiwiRail (track and platforms); Auckland Transport (buildings)
- Operator: Auckland One Rail
- Line: North Auckland Line
- Distance: 4.08 km (2.54 mi) from Westfield Junction
- Platforms: Island platform (P1 & P2)
- Tracks: Mainline (2)

Construction
- Parking: No
- Cycle facilities: No
- Accessible: Yes (Lifts)

Other information
- Fare zone: Isthmus

History
- Opened: 20 December 1873
- Rebuilt: 2011 - 2012
- Electrified: April 2014

Passengers
- 2018/19: 142,000

Services
Preceding station	Auckland Transport (Auckland One Rail)	Following station
Greenlane towards Henderson	Onehunga West Line	Penrose towards Onehunga
Penrose towards Pukekohe	South City Line	Greenlane towards Newmarket
Location

Ellerslie railway station serves the South City and Onehunga West lines of the Auckland railway network in New Zealand. It was opened in 1873. It has an island platform and is 1.37 km (0.85 mi) south of Greenlane and 1.45 km (0.90 mi) north of Penrose.

== Access to Station ==
Access to the station at the northern end was by a ramp down from the footbridge crossing the SH1 Southern Motorway between Main Highway, Ellerslie and Kalmia Street. At the southern end of the station there is a subway between Findlay Street and Sultan Street.

== History ==
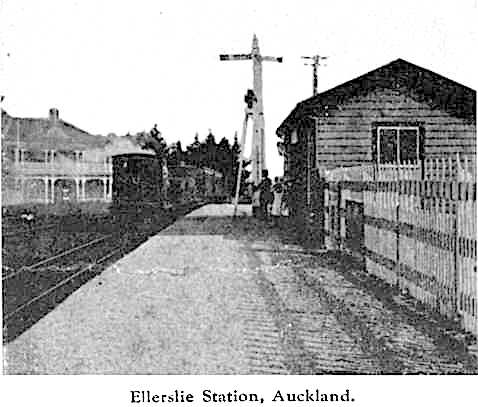
Ellerslie railway station about 1892

The station was on the railway line between Auckland and Onehunga via Newmarket, Ellerslie and Penrose, built by Brogden & Co. Completion was delayed by bankruptcy of a sub contractor. A trial passenger run was made on 24 October 1873 and, in November, passengers were carried to a point near the cricket ground, though there was no station. A temporary platform was then built. However, it wasn't until 20 December 1873 that the line opened with great public celebration, though only 15 travelled on the first timetabled train. Ellerslie wasn't shown in the timetable of the initial 3 trains each way, though special trains to Ellerslie Racecourse were advertised at the same time. The service was increased to 4 each way in January 1874. Brogdens ran the railway until 30 April 1874, when New Zealand Railways Department (NZR) took over. In 1875 Ellerslie was shown as a stop for Sunday trains only.

That year it was noted that the station had been put on the wrong side of the line, contrary to the terms of a gift of the land, made by Robert Graham, who had built a pleasure garden at Ellerslie. Around 1879, £300 was spent moving the office, platform, and sidings across the line and fencing the station yard, though it was noted the racecourse platform was not to be moved. In 1876 Robert Graham applied for a siding to his quarry, 19 ch (380 m) south of the station to produce ballast. and in 1878 he applied for a siding to his slaughter house. In 1885 it was noted that a private siding had been granted on 6 September 1876, but that Robert Graham had since given it up and it was then being used by NZR.

The line through Ellerslie subsequently became part of the North Island Main Trunk and later the North Auckland Line, with the branch line from Penrose to Onehunga becoming the Onehunga Branch. The station at Ellerslie was initially between the railway bridges, with the main road running directly through the village and intersecting the line at a level crossing. By 1874 residents became concerned at a number of accidents that had occurred at the crossing and successfully lobbied for relocation of the station to the opposite side of the road, requiring realignment of the road to its present route, though it may have been about 1909 when a bridge was built. The railway encouraged suburban settlement and allowed a daily delivery of letters to the station until the opening of a post office in 1911 and also provided a telegraph office. From 1884 to 1912 there was a Post Office at the station, operated by railway staff.

In 1877 a request was made for £60 for sheep and cattle pens. In 1884 £80 was requested for furniture, fittings, etc, for opening Ellerslie station. By then Ellerslie had a 4th class station, passenger platform, fixed signals, urinals and a passing loop for 28 wagons. In 1886 a shelter shed for horses was added and in 1892 a stationmaster's house. In 1896 Block signalling was introduced between Remuera and Ellerslie, which by then also had a cart approach, turntable and, from 1897, a loading bank. The turntable was used for Classes J and P tender engines on race days, but it was moved to Cambridge in 1899.

Between 1905 and 1909 the line was doubled and the Main Highway level crossing was replaced by a bridge. From 1 July 1909 the suburban service was extended to Papatoetoe. In 1915 the 6 ft (1.8 m) wide footbridge ramp, at the north end of platform, was widened to 9 ft (2.7 m) for about £200. Electric lighting came in 1928.

From its opening the station was extremely busy with passengers and goods travelling to the port of Onehunga, visitors to the racecourse and gardens, and racehorses travelling from around New Zealand to compete at Ellerslie racecourse. Four or five sidings were constructed specifically for horse boxes and hundreds of residents often gathered to witness their arrival and unloading. The station has had a variety of footbridges, one of which was involved in a 1943 derailment where the train's engine caused the bridge to collapse after striking the supports.

Train traffic increased considerably with industrial and suburban development, the returns being recorded in the annual statements to Parliament. For example, from 1924 to 1926 ticket sales roughly halved, with a slight recovery in 1928, when 23,128 tickets and 12,540 season tickets were sold. In 1949, sales were 40,132 tickets and 11,461 season tickets.

Between 1950 and 1959, when William Durbridge was appointed stationmaster, up to ten staff members were permanently employed. In November 1959 a new station with modern loading facilities was opened at Tamaki and Durbridge was subsequently transferred, Ellerslie becoming passenger-only.

On 26 November 1959 the station was moved to a new site on the opposite side of line. On 28 November 1959 it closed as an officered goods station, then only serving passengers and parcels. In 1960 £2,300 was approved for a ramp to connect the island platform with a proposed subway under the motorway, being constructed by the Ministry of Works. In 1960 the sidings were torn up to provide space for the Southern Motorway (see 1940 and 1972 photos below and 1960 photo in external links). The old station was severely damaged by fire in the early 1970s and was demolished in 1972, when the dilapidated condition of the station was noted. A shelter was then built and this was in turn replaced by smaller shelters in the mid-1990s. A new station with 2 lifts to the footbridge and wet-weather shelters was opened in 2011, and the platform narrowed by 2 m (6 ft 7 in) to allow for motorway widening.

== Services ==
Auckland One Rail, on behalf of Auckland Transport, operates South City line and Onehunga West line services.

== Gallery ==
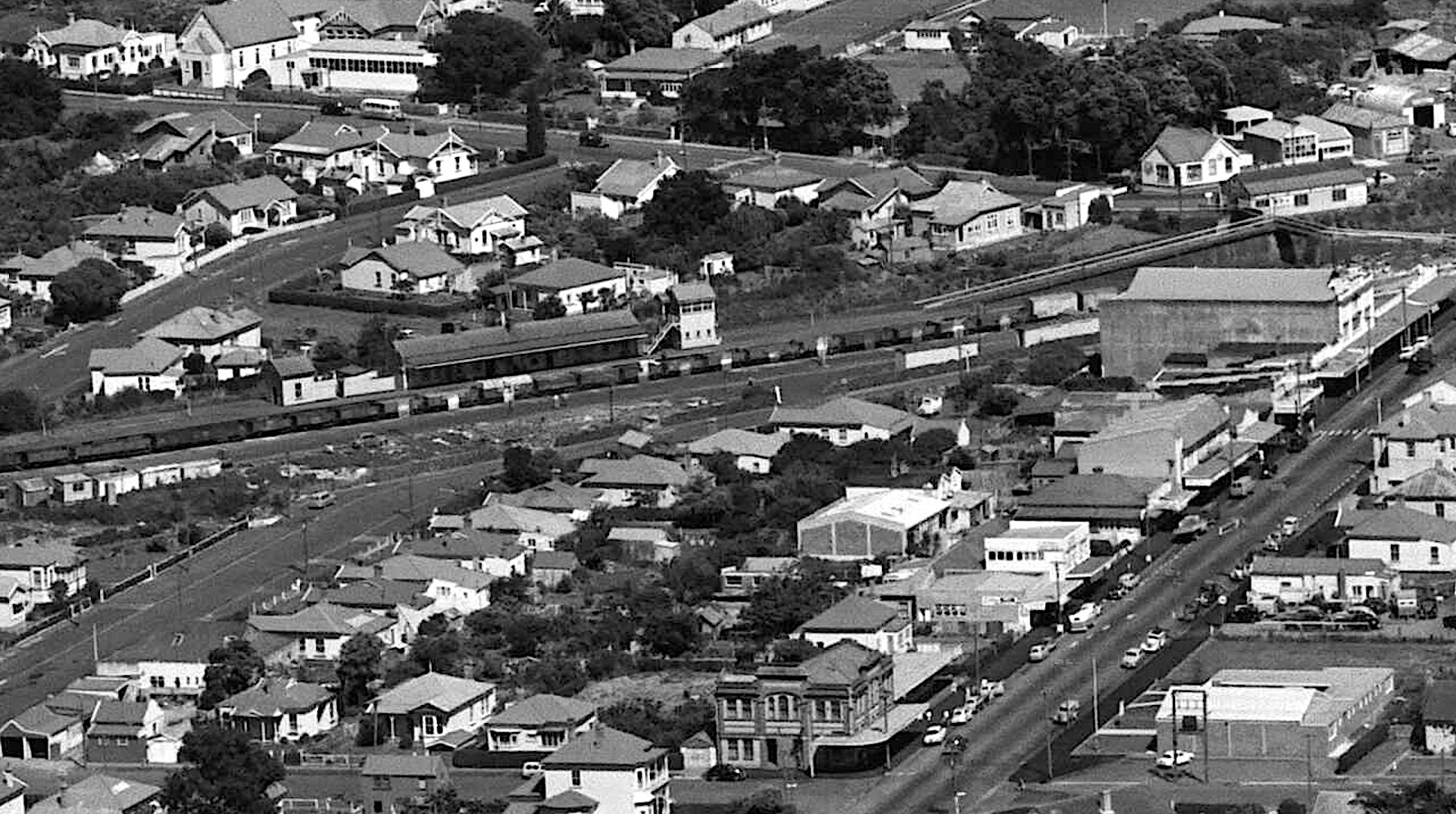
Ellerslie in 1959

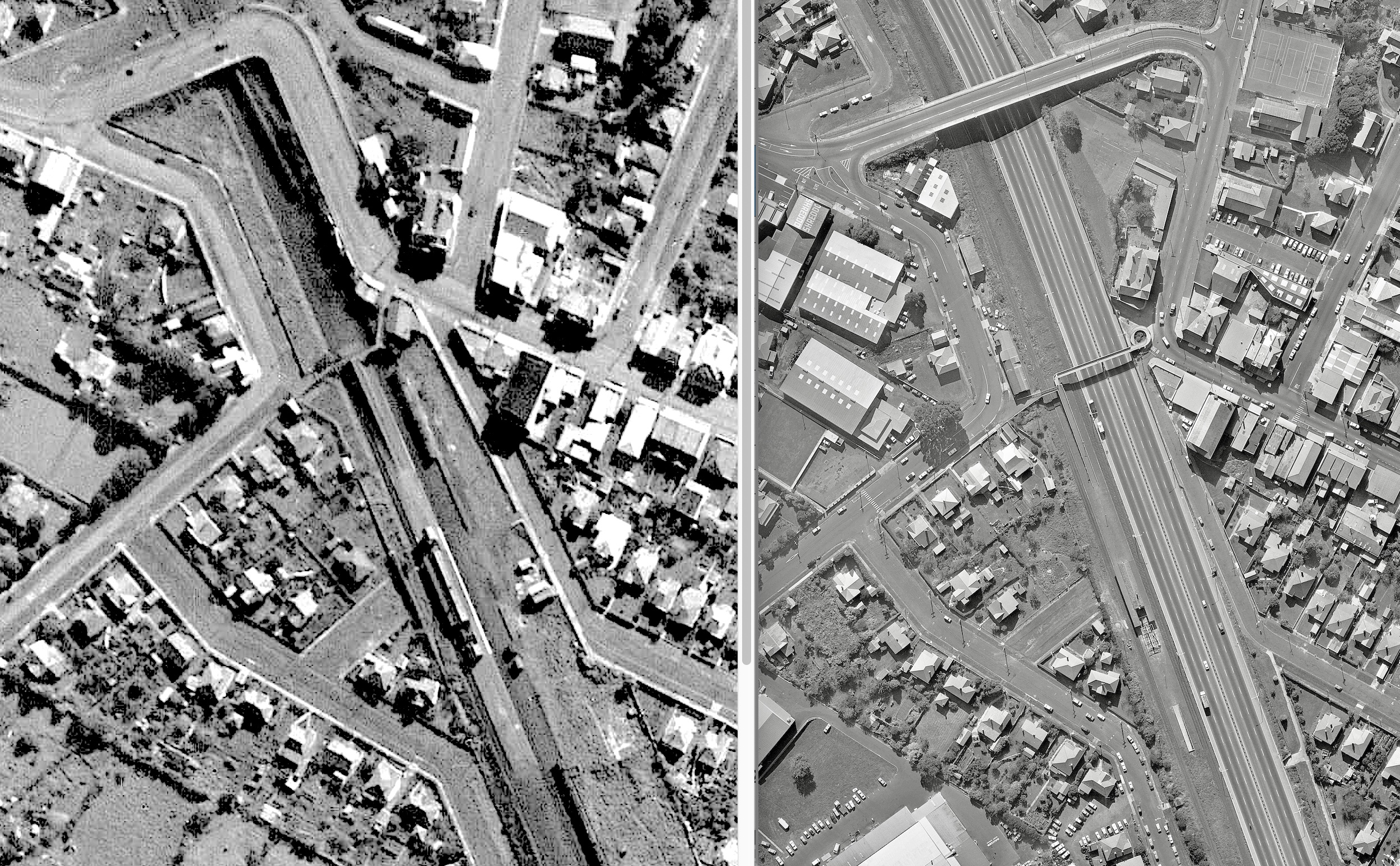
Ellerslie 1940 and 1972

== See also ==
- List of Auckland railway stations
