= Tapper Transport =

Tapper Transport is a freight transport and import/export business in Southdown, Auckland, New Zealand. In 2010 it was sold for $15 million to Port of Tauranga, after its longtime director Simon Tapper died. Simon Tapper had also been active as a chairman of the Road Transport Forum, a road freight industry group.
