= Greenlane railway station =

Train station in Auckland, New Zealand

Greenlane
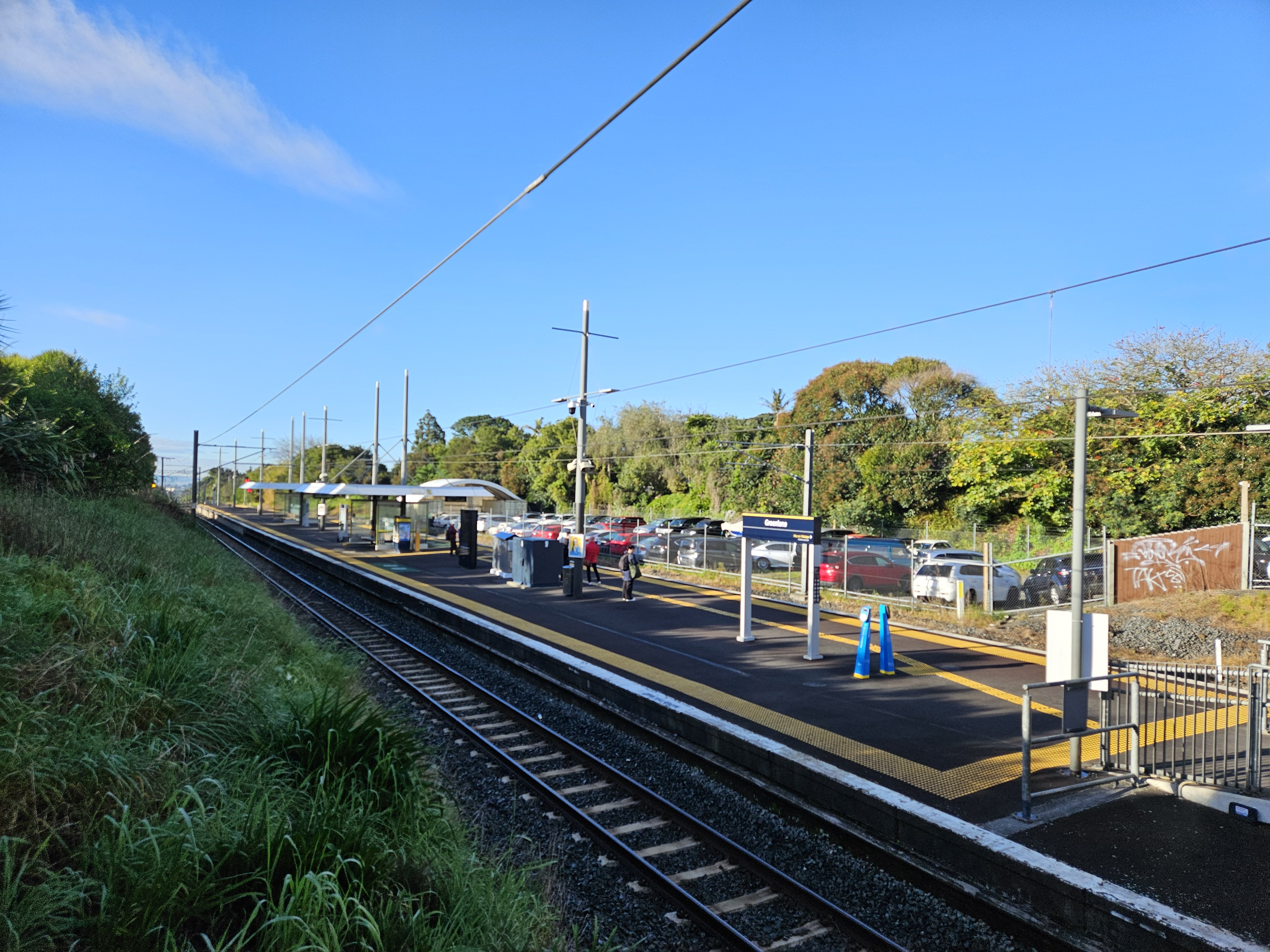
- The station in 2024

General information
- Location: Greenlane, Auckland; New Zealand
- Coordinates: 36.889635°S 174.797459°E
- System: Auckland Transport Urban rail
- Owner: KiwiRail (track and platforms); Auckland Transport (buildings)
- Operator: Auckland One Rail
- Line: North Auckland Line
- Distance: 5.50 km (3.42 mi) from Westfield Junction
- Platforms: Island platform (P1 & P2)
- Tracks: Mainline (2)

Construction
- Parking: No
- Cycle facilities: No
- Accessible: Yes

Other information
- Fare zone: Isthmus

History
- Opened: 20 December 1877
- Electrified: April 2014

Passengers
- 2009: 517 passengers/day

Services
Preceding station	Auckland Transport (Auckland One Rail)	Following station
Remuera towards Henderson	Onehunga West Line	Ellerslie towards Onehunga
Ellerslie towards Pukekohe	South City Line	Remuera towards Newmarket
Location

Greenlane railway station serves the South City line and Onehunga West line of the Auckland railway network. It was opened circa 1877. It has an island platform and is reached via a ramp from Green Lane East.

It is the nearest station to Ellerslie Racecourse, Greenlane Clinical Centre (formerly known as Green Lane Hospital), ASB Showgrounds and Cornwall Park.

== Services ==
Auckland One Rail, on behalf of Auckland Transport, operates suburban services on the South City line and Onehunga West line.

== See also ==
- List of Auckland railway stations
