= Southdown, New Zealand =

Coordinates: 36.92293°S 174.822521°E

Southdown
- Suburb
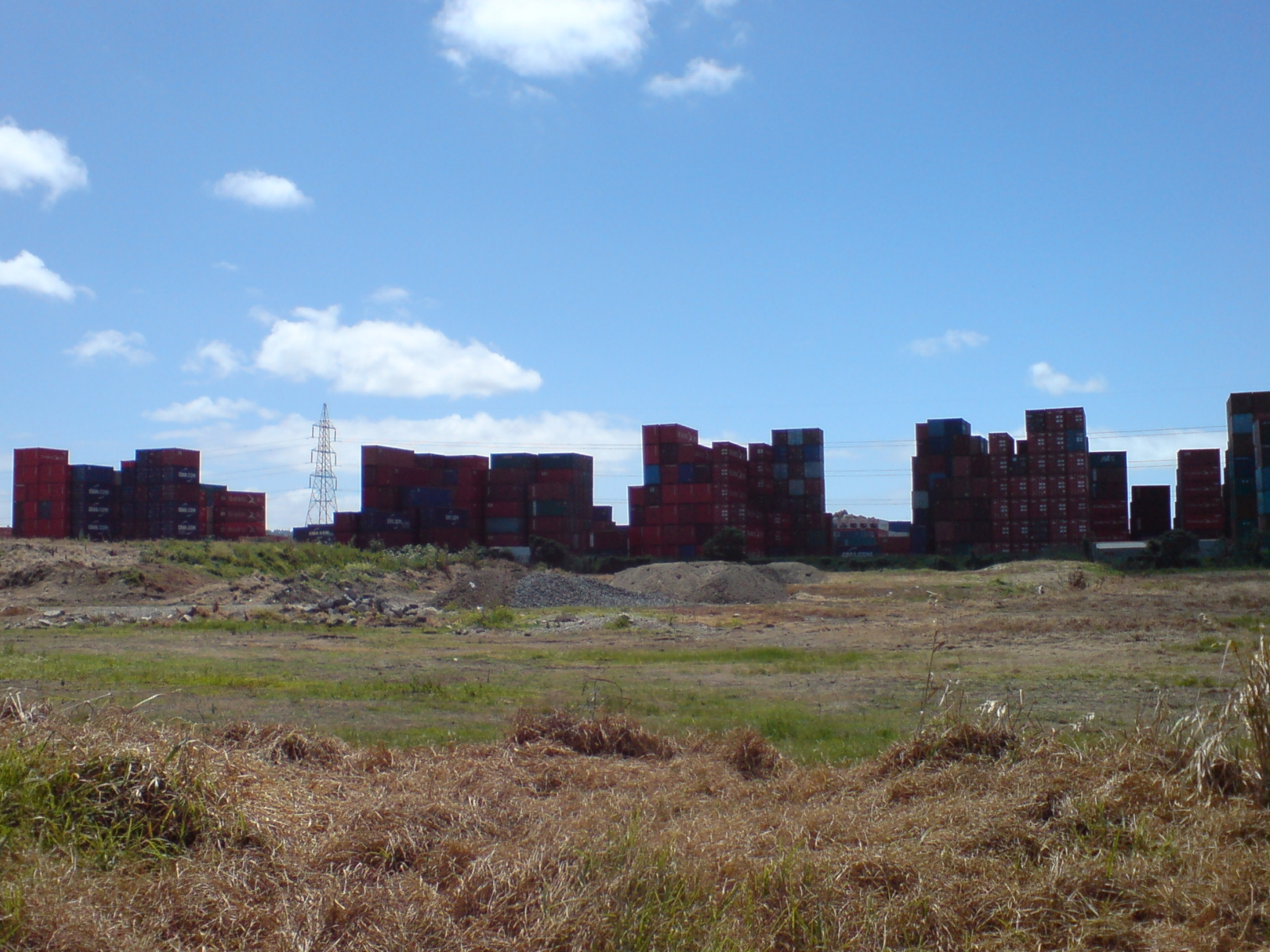
- Containers at the Southdown Inland Port
- Interactive map of Southdown
- Country: New Zealand
- City: Auckland Council
- Electoral ward: Maungakiekie-Tamaki ward
- Local board: Maungakiekie-Tamaki Local Board
- Train stations: Southdown Train Station (closed)

Oranga	Penrose	Mount Wellington
Te Papapa	Southdown	Sylvia Park
(Mangere Inlet)	(Mangere Inlet)	Westfield

Southdown is an industrial estate in Auckland, New Zealand. The main company in the suburb was the former Southdown Freezing Works, part of a large industrial zone located near the North Island Main Trunk railway line. The buildings were decommissioned during the 1980s and 1990s, releasing large areas of land to be redeveloped as office parks.

The Waikaraka Cycleway ends at the bottom of Hugo Johnston Drive, next to the site of the defunct Southdown Power Station.

== Etymology ==
The name came from the Southdown breed of sheep, which originated in the South Downs of the counties of Kent and Sussex in south-east England. The Southdown was introduced to New Zealand in 1842, and was cross-bred to produce fast-maturing lambs for the meat trade.

== Environment ==
Hugo Johnston Drive is the site of a historic 2.5ha asbestos cement dump used by James Hardie Industries from 1938 to 1983. The nearby Southdown Reserve (opposite the defunct Southdown Power Station) has been closed to the public since March 1999, after workers discovered asbestos material there.

For many years the freezing works and other industrial activities located in Southdown and Westfield were discharging large amounts of untreated waste into the Māngere Inlet. This had a detrimental effect on the ecology of the Manukau Harbour, which at the turn of the 20th century had been a popular and attractive place to swim, sail, fish and gather shell fish. For most of the middle of the 20th century it was a health hazard and its shell-fish a probable source of food poisoning. Since the freezing works were fully closed the water quality has improved greatly.

== Industry ==
=== Freezing works ===
In 1903 the Auckland Farmers Freezing Company (AFFCO) was formed. They established a slaughterhouse, the Southdown Freezing Works, next to the railway line in 1905. The works were closed on 30 April 1981, and the buildings were later removed or burnt down.

=== Power station ===
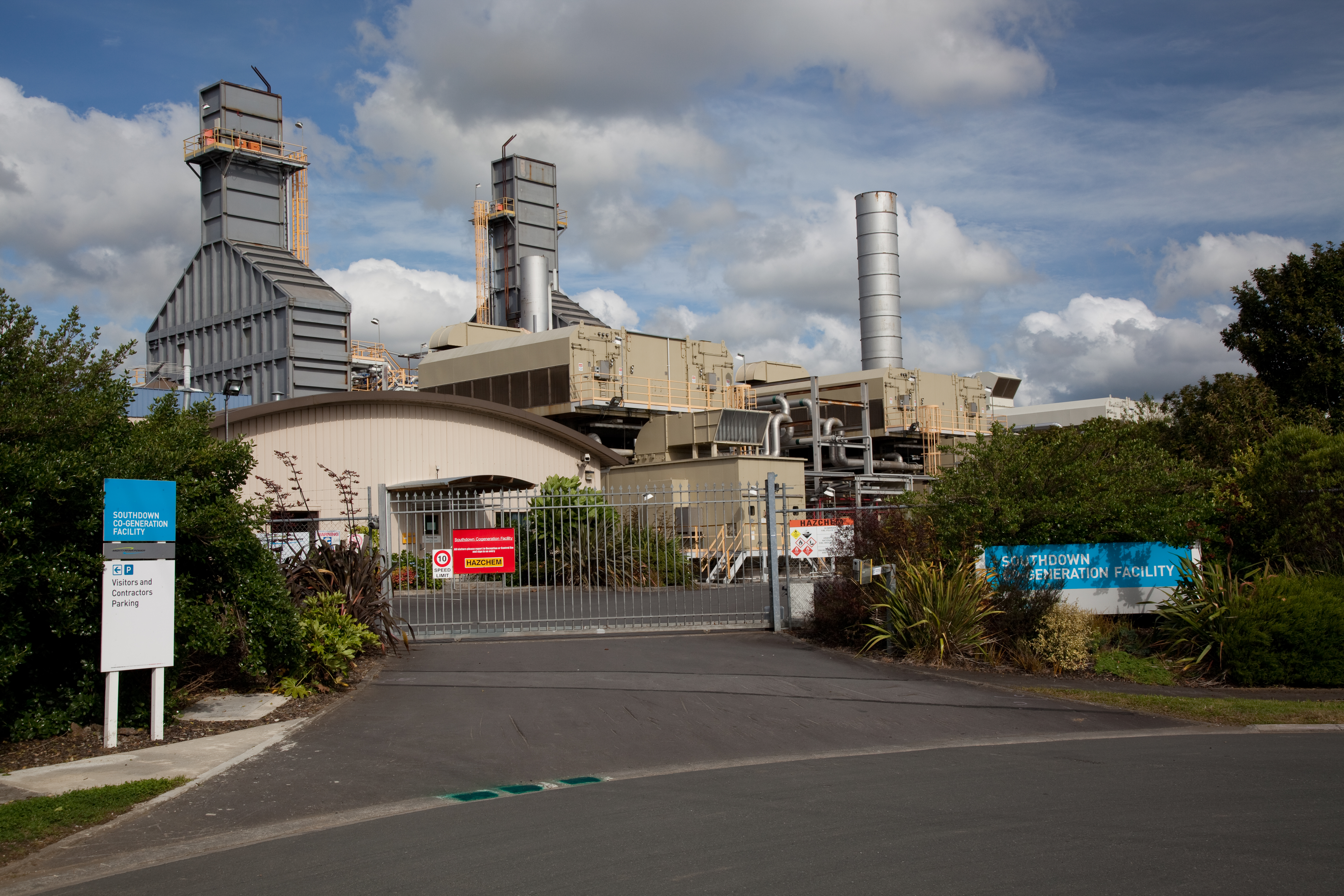
The Southdown Co-generation Facility in 2009.

The Southdown Co-generation Facility (also known as the Southdown Power Station) was a primarily natural gas-fired combined cycle gas turbine co-generation power station. Originally a baseload station, reduction in production from the Maui gas field leading to increased gas prices meant it transitioned to more flexible peaking generation. It was developed by a joint venture between TransAlta and Mercury Energy.

When commissioned in December 1996, the plant had two General Electric LM6000 aeroderivative gas turbines (2×42MW) and one steam turbine (37.8MW). The steam turbine used steam produced from exhaust heat of the gas turbines. To provide steam when the turbines were shut down, a gas-fired auxiliary boiler was added in 2005. In 2007 a third LM6000 (47MW) was added, capable of running on natural gas or diesel. The plant was originally planned to provide 114MW of power and emit about 410,000 tonnes of carbon dioxide annually. After upgrades, it produced 170MW of power. The site also had an 800kW diesel powered generator used in site power outage emergencies.

A substantial amount of the water required by the station, on average 61% (357,000m3 annually), was supplied by an on-site bore providing non-potable ground water. Natural gas was supplied to the site by pipeline.

Power was injected into the double-circuit Henderson to Ōtāhuhu 220kV line via two 11.5/220kV transformers. Steam was piped to consumers in the nearby industrial area - including Carter Holt Harvey’s (CHH) Paper Recycling Mill located nearby - at pressures of 22.5 and 132.0 psi.

In 2000, Mighty River Power purchased 50% of the plant. and purchased the remainder in 2002. In March 2015, Mighty River Power announced that it would decommission the station. Demolition started in May 2022 and was completed in 2024.

== Southdown railway station ==
Southdown
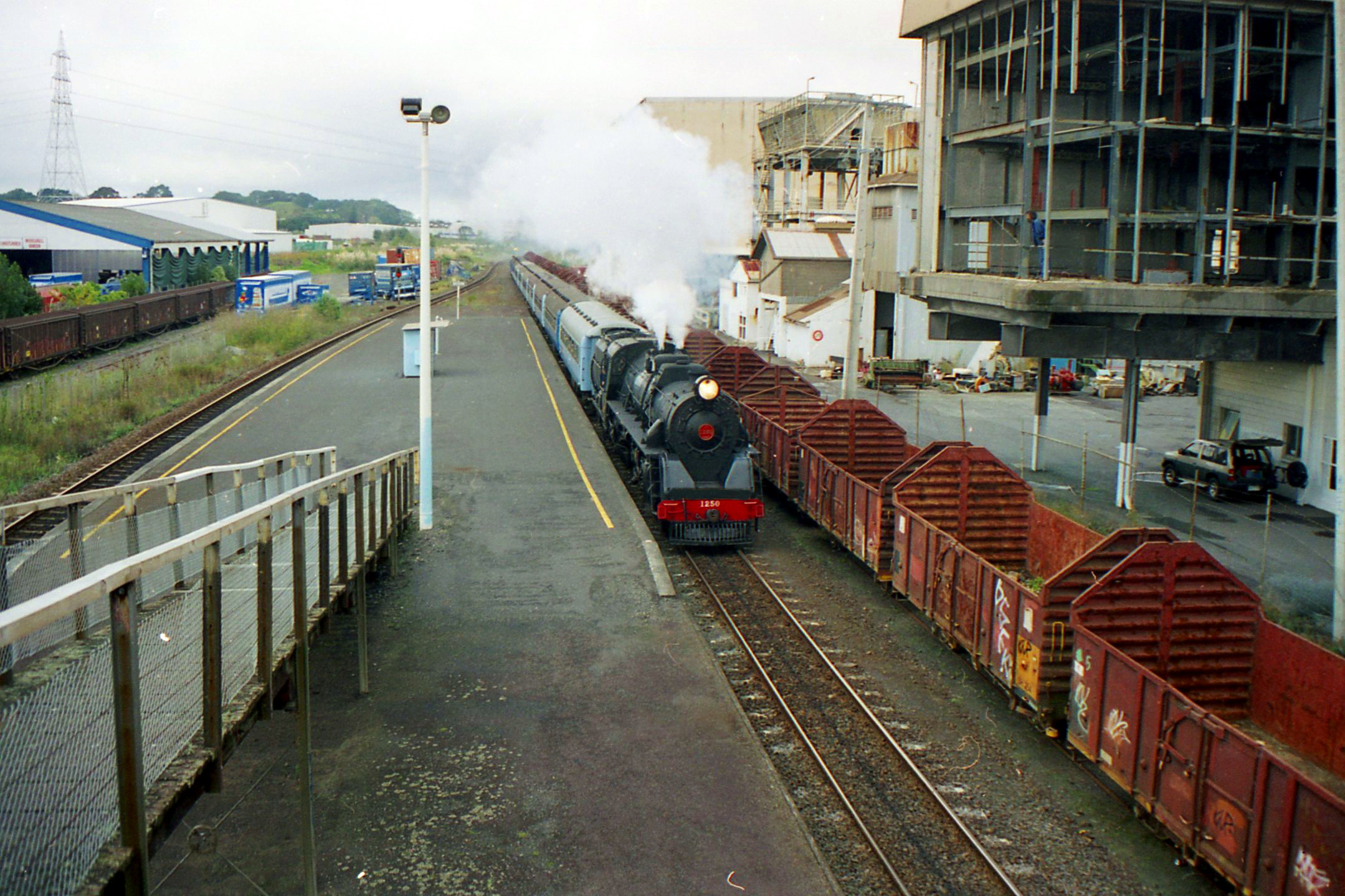
- Southdown station, looking south, on 9 June 2014

General information
- Location: Southdown, Auckland
- Line: North Auckland Line

History
- Opened: 8 August 1905
- Closed: 30 May 2004
- Former names: Glasgow until 11 October 1908

Adjacent stations
Preceding station	KiwiRail	Following station
Penrose; 1.89 km (1.17 mi) towards Auckland	North Auckland Line	Westfield station closed 1.91 km (1.19 mi) towards Wellington
Location

The railway through the area was opened on 20 May 1875, as part of the Auckland and Mercer Railway, built by Brogden & Co, who extended it from Penrose. On 6 November 1908 the line became part of the North Island Main Trunk, with services reaching Wellington.

Southdown railway station was a station on the Southern Line of the Auckland suburban railway network. It was opened to passengers on 8 August 1905, and closed in 2004.

It was double tracked and had an island platform layout. Pedestrian access was via a footbridge connecting the end of Southdown Lane to the Southdown Freezing Works. In 1907 £135 was authorised for a platform and shelter shed. Electric lights were added in 1943 and £3,000 for was approved for a new 113 m (371 ft) long, 450 mm (18 in) high platform in 1963. There was a fire on 18 March 1968 and the station had a small steel shelter shed by 1990.

Services were withdrawn by the Auckland Regional Transport Authority (ARTA) on 30 May 2004 due to low patronage and safety reasons. In the years immediately preceding its closure, patronage had increased on Auckland suburban trains but Southdown had not followed the trend and passenger usage of the station had declined to only approximately forty people per weekday. Safety concerns were raised due to the poor state of the footbridge used to access the platform, and the fact that to access the footbridge, passengers had to cross an unprotected freight siding.
