= Te Papapa railway station =

Train station in Auckland, New Zealand

Te Papapa
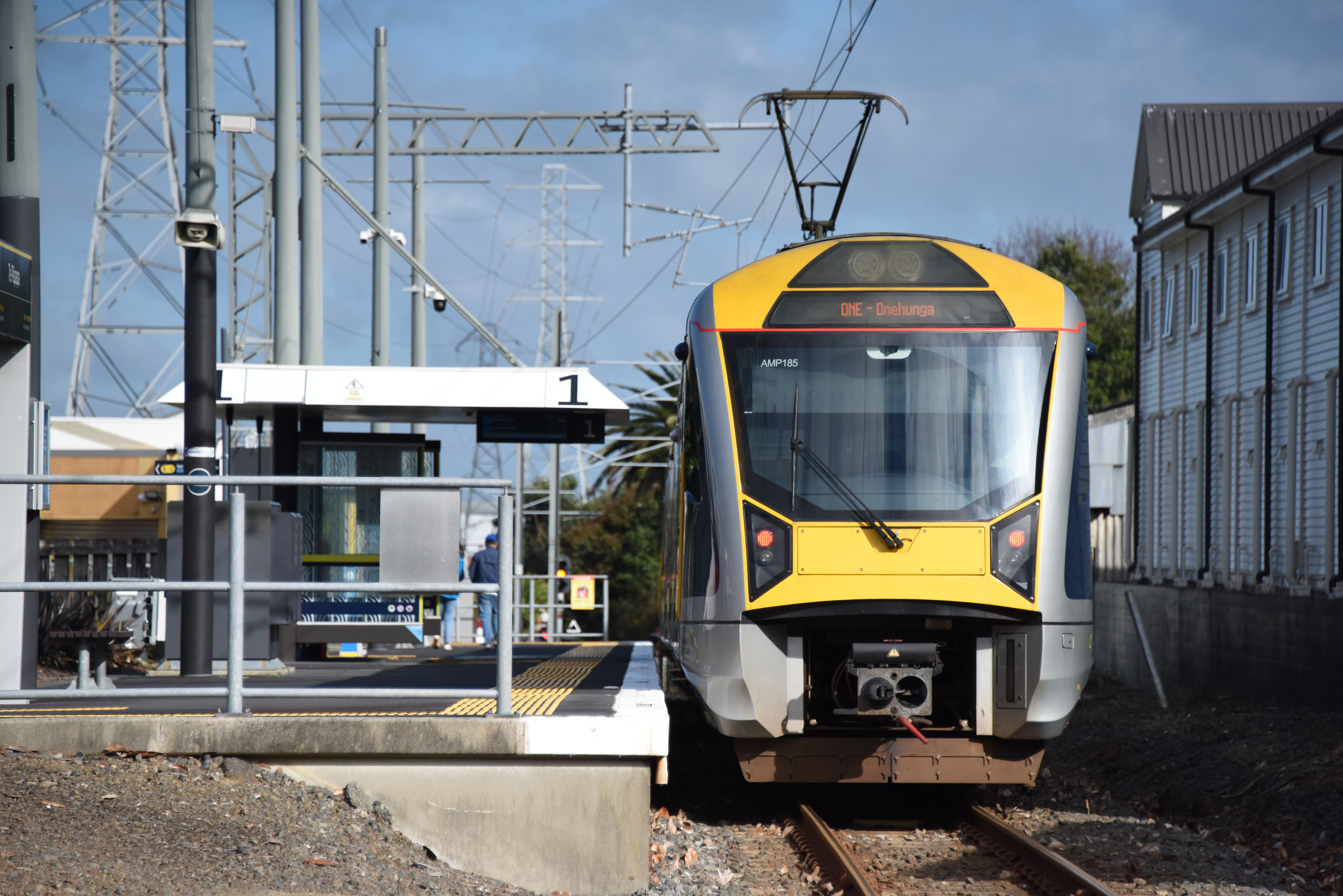
- AM class EMU departing from the station

General information
- Location: Te Papapa, Auckland; New Zealand
- Coordinates: 36.92011°S 174.80143°E
- System: Auckland Transport Urban rail
- Owner: KiwiRail (track and platforms); Auckland Transport (buildings)
- Operator: Auckland One Rail
- Line: Onehunga Branch
- Platforms: Side platform (P1)
- Tracks: 1

Construction
- Parking: No
- Cycle facilities: Yes
- Accessible: Yes

Other information
- Station code: TPP
- Fare zone: Isthmus

History
- Opened: September 2010
- Electrified: April 2014

Key dates
- 1879: First station opened
- 1973: First station closed

Services
Preceding station	Auckland Transport (Auckland One Rail)	Following station
Penrose towards Henderson	Onehunga West Line	Onehunga Terminus
Location

Te Papapa railway station is on the Onehunga Branch section of the Onehunga West line, one of the lines of the Auckland railway network in New Zealand. It has a side platform layout.

Onehunga West Line services between Onehunga and Henderson are provided by Auckland One Rail on behalf of Auckland Transport.

== History ==
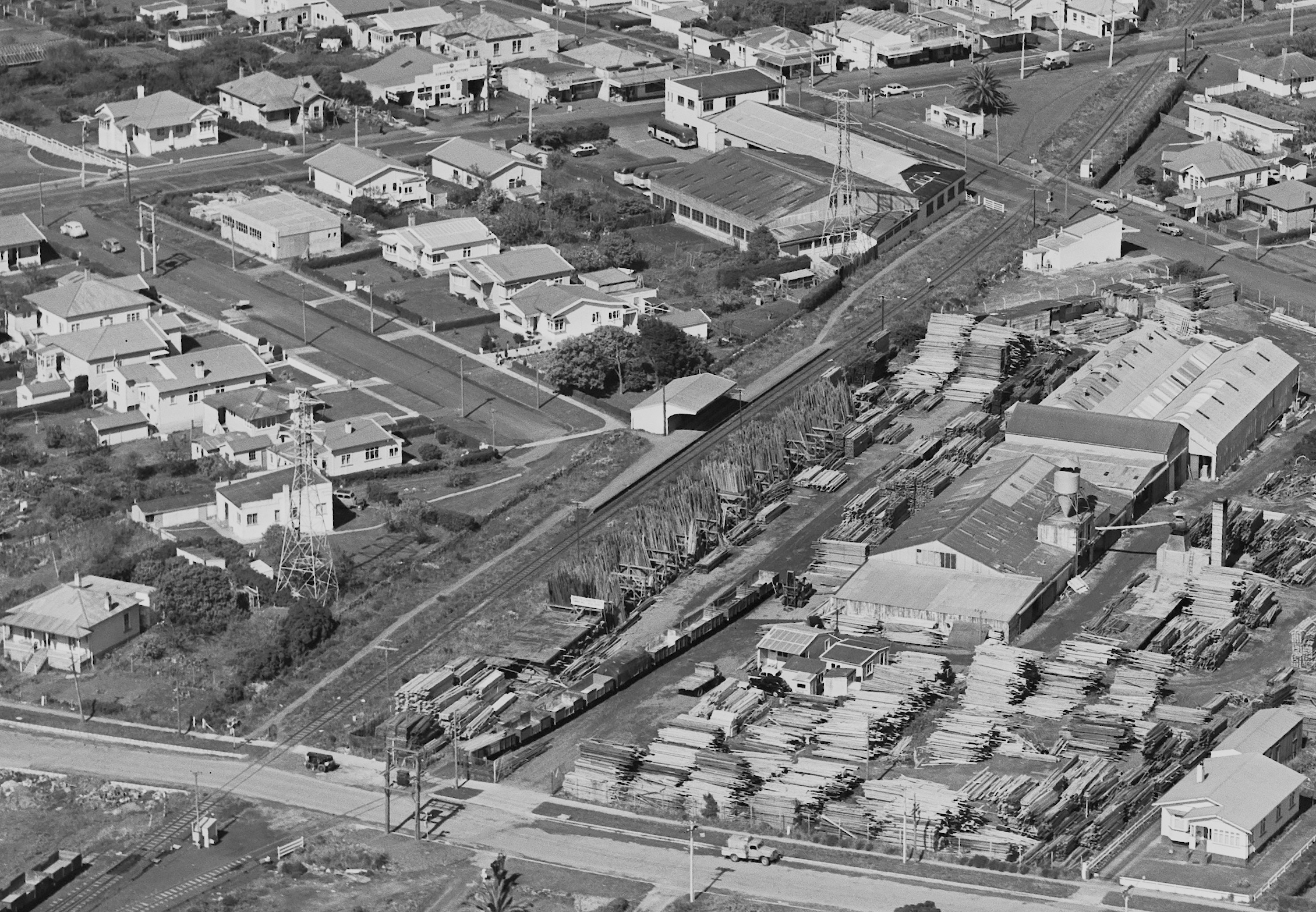
Te papapa railway station, 1959.

The Auckland and Onehunga Railway was opened in December 1873. As early as 1877 trains would stop for passengers at a place known as 'Rout's Corner'. Te Papapa opened as a flag station in May 1879.

=== Closure ===
Direct passenger train services between Onehunga and Auckland ceased on 28 July 1950. A workers' train service continued running between Onehunga and Penrose, until 19 January 1973 when the line was completely closed to passenger services.

=== Re-opening ===
The campaign to reopen the line was launched by Auckland Regional Council councillor Mike Lee in mid-2002. In 2007, following a successful 8000-signature petition, the government announced that the 3.5km branch line between Penrose and Onehunga would be reinstated.

A new station was opened on the site of the old station, with regular Onehunga line services beginning on 19 September 2010.

== See also ==
- Onehunga Branch
- Public transport in Auckland
- Transport in Auckland
- List of Auckland railway stations
