= Penrose, New Zealand =

Penrose
- Suburb
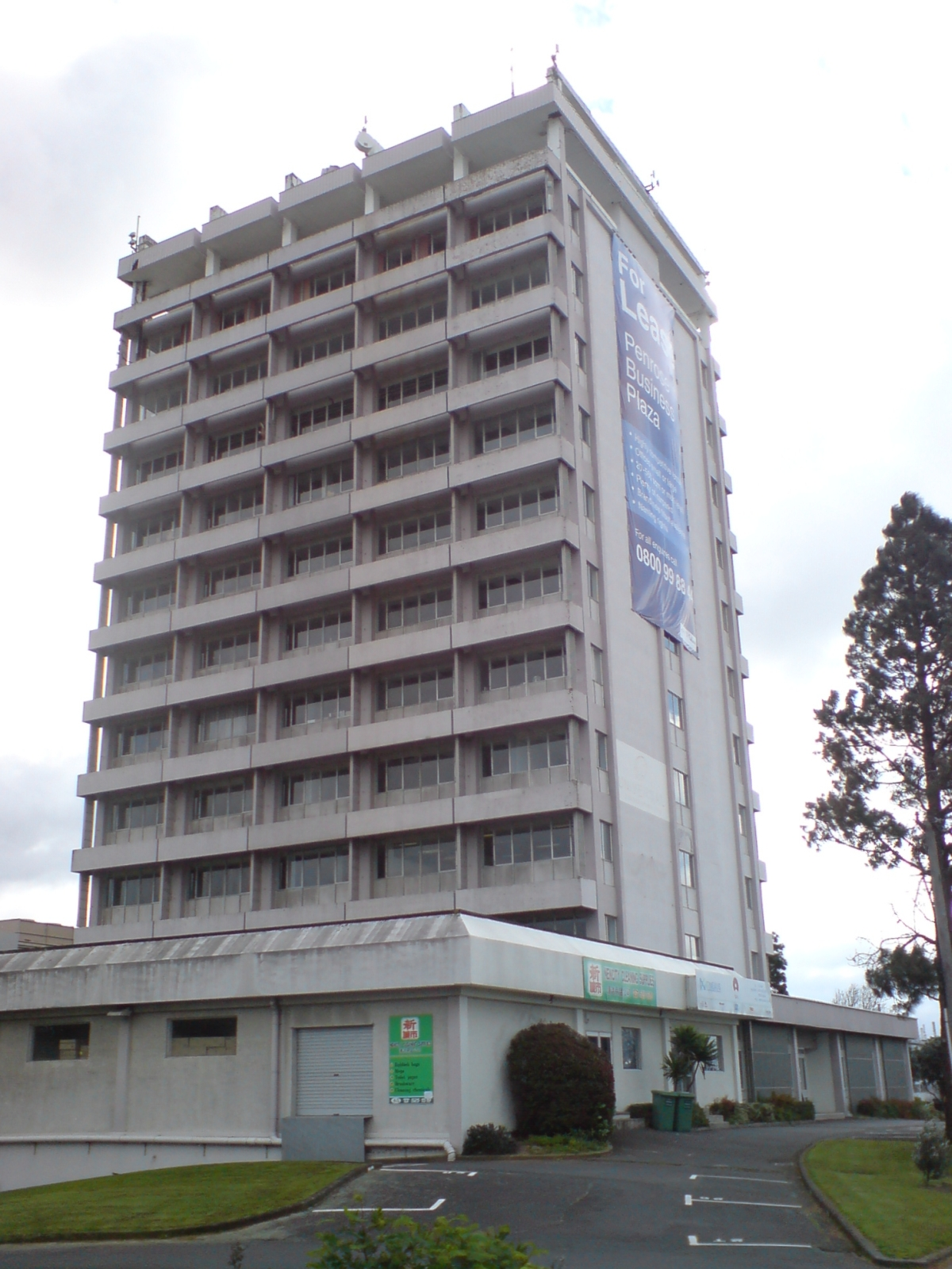
- Penrose business plaza, an office skyscraper in the area, a local landmark – it towers over most of the lower buildings of the area
- Interactive map of Penrose
- Coordinates: 36.919°S 174.820°E
- Country: New Zealand
- City: Auckland
- Local authority: Auckland Council
- Electoral ward: Maungakiekie-Tāmaki ward
- Local board: Maungakiekie-Tāmaki Local Board
- Board subdivision: Maungakiekie
- Established: 1860s (approx.)

Area
  - Land: 642 ha (1,590 acres)

Population (June 2025)
  - Total: 1,350
  - Density: 210/km^{2} (545/sq mi)
- Train stations: Penrose Train Station

Greenlane	Ellerslie	Ellerslie
One Tree Hill	Penrose	Mount Wellington
Oranga	Te Papapa	Southdown

Penrose is an industrial suburb in Auckland, New Zealand. It is located to the southeast of the city centre, at a distance of about nine kilometres, between the suburbs of Oranga and Mount Wellington, and close to the Mangere Inlet, an arm of the Manukau Harbour.

In 2008, there were 44,975 employees and 4,998 businesses in the Penrose area, 14 per cent of Auckland City's employment, making up seven per cent of its businesses. Of these, 16% were in manufacturing, 14% in wholesale trade, 10% in administrative and support services, 10% in professional, scientific and technical services, 8% in construction and 6% in transport, postal and warehousing business types.

== Demographics ==
Penrose covers 6.42 km^{2} (2.48 sq mi) and had an estimated population of 1,350 as of June 2025, with a population density of 210 people per km^{2}.

Historical population
Year	Pop.	±% p.a.
2006	675	—
2013	645	−0.65%
2018	843	+5.50%
2023	1,029	+4.07%

Penrose had a population of 1,029 in the 2023 New Zealand census, an increase of 186 people (22.1%) since the 2018 census, and an increase of 384 people (59.5%) since the 2013 census. There were 471 males, 555 females and 3 people of other genders in 465 dwellings. 3.8% of people identified as LGBTIQ+. The median age was 55.9 years (compared with 38.1 years nationally). There were 111 people (10.8%) aged under 15 years, 138 (13.4%) aged 15 to 29, 318 (30.9%) aged 30 to 64, and 462 (44.9%) aged 65 or older.

People could identify as more than one ethnicity. The results were 56.3% European (Pākehā); 8.7% Māori; 10.5% Pasifika; 31.2% Asian; 3.2% Middle Eastern, Latin American and African New Zealanders (MELAA); and 1.2% other, which includes people giving their ethnicity as "New Zealander". English was spoken by 92.1%, Māori language by 0.9%, Samoan by 2.9%, and other languages by 27.4%. No language could be spoken by 1.2% (e.g. too young to talk). New Zealand Sign Language was known by 0.3%. The percentage of people born overseas was 42.6, compared with 28.8% nationally.

Religious affiliations were 44.9% Christian, 3.5% Hindu, 2.9% Islam, 0.9% Māori religious beliefs, 3.8% Buddhist, 0.3% New Age, and 2.0% other religions. People who answered that they had no religion were 36.4%, and 5.5% of people did not answer the census question.

Of those at least 15 years old, 264 (28.8%) people had a bachelor's or higher degree, 429 (46.7%) had a post-high school certificate or diploma, and 231 (25.2%) people exclusively held high school qualifications. The median income was $35,000, compared with $41,500 nationally. 87 people (9.5%) earned over $100,000 compared to 12.1% nationally. The employment status of those at least 15 was that 318 (34.6%) people were employed full-time, 72 (7.8%) were part-time, and 15 (1.6%) were unemployed.

== History ==
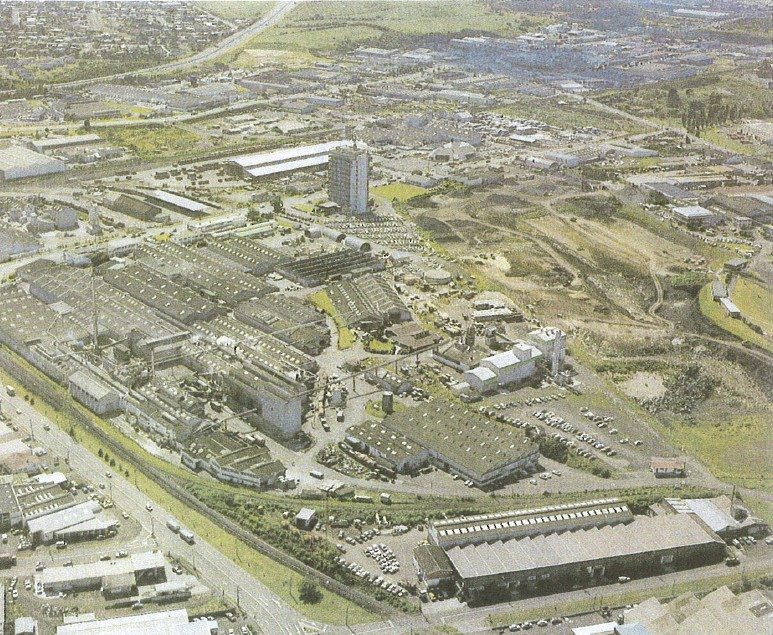
The New Zealand Forest Products headquarters and factory in 1982. Note the same skyscraper in the upper right.

The area was purchased from three local Maori Chiefs by The Williams family in the late 1830s, the farm being called Penrose after their home area in Cornwall, England.

The railway line between Auckland and Onehunga running through Penrose (now known as the Onehunga Line) was one of the first Government funded railways in New Zealand, being opened in 1873. It was built by the Auckland provincial government.

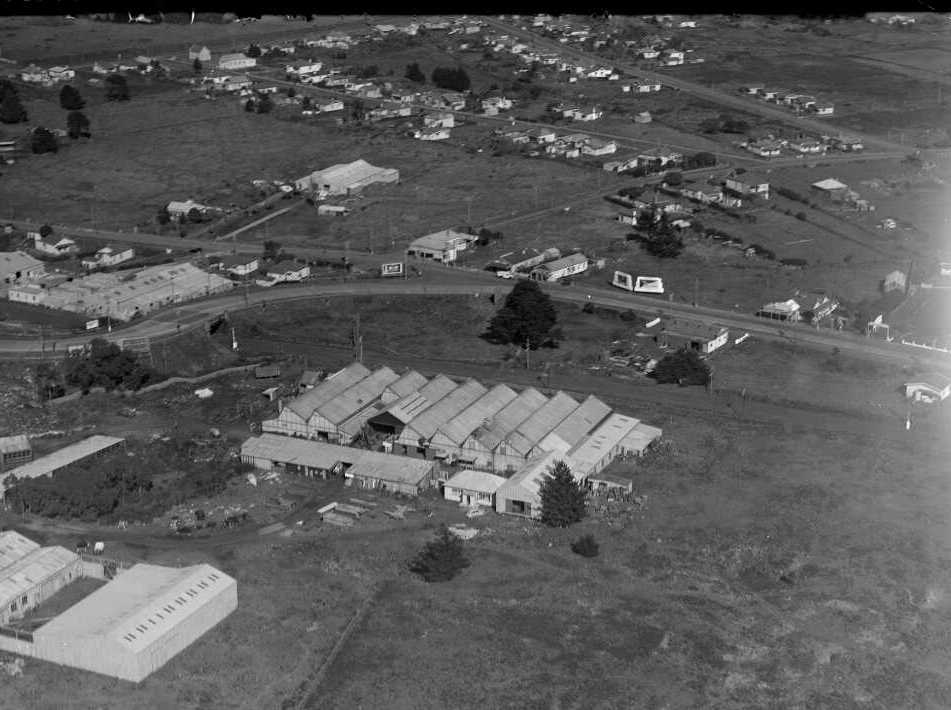
Penrose circa 1930 from above Cain Road

Industry flourished in the area from the 1920s, due to its close connection to the main railway line and the main road (Great South Road) with these important transport links later strengthened by the motorway (State Highway 1) built following the same alignment in the 1950s. By this time, around 5,000 workers were employed in the suburb. Following the Second World War a global shortage in goods led to an expansion of manufacturing in New Zealand with Penrose becoming the main area for manufacturing in suburban Auckland.

The new motorway and the move of industrial and manufacturing occupations out of older centres like the Auckland CBD soon started a boom in the Penrose-Mount Wellington area. Industry also successfully lobbied for state housing to be built close by, to provide the new area with a supply of labour. To this day, the area remains almost exclusively industrial, with a mix of run-down areas and newly established sites.

== Climate ==
Climate data for Penrose (2001–2017)
Month	Jan	Feb	Mar	Apr	May	Jun	Jul	Aug	Sep	Oct	Nov	Dec	Year
Record high °C (°F)	28.9 (84.0)	29.5 (85.1)	28.6 (83.5)	26.4 (79.5)	22.9 (73.2)	21.2 (70.2)	19.7 (67.5)	21.1 (70.0)	23.7 (74.7)	26.5 (79.7)	26.5 (79.7)	31.6 (88.9)	31.6 (88.9)
Mean maximum °C (°F)	27.5 (81.5)	27.2 (81.0)	26.1 (79.0)	24.4 (75.9)	21.5 (70.7)	19.2 (66.6)	18.4 (65.1)	18.9 (66.0)	20.3 (68.5)	21.8 (71.2)	23.4 (74.1)	25.8 (78.4)	28.3 (82.9)
Mean daily maximum °C (°F)	23.8 (74.8)	24.3 (75.7)	23.2 (73.8)	21.1 (70.0)	18.4 (65.1)	16.2 (61.2)	15.5 (59.9)	15.9 (60.6)	17.3 (63.1)	18.3 (64.9)	20.1 (68.2)	22.0 (71.6)	19.7 (67.4)
Daily mean °C (°F)	19.5 (67.1)	20.0 (68.0)	18.8 (65.8)	16.7 (62.1)	14.1 (57.4)	12.1 (53.8)	11.1 (52.0)	11.7 (53.1)	13.1 (55.6)	14.2 (57.6)	15.9 (60.6)	18.0 (64.4)	15.4 (59.8)
Mean daily minimum °C (°F)	15.2 (59.4)	15.7 (60.3)	14.4 (57.9)	12.3 (54.1)	9.9 (49.8)	8.1 (46.6)	6.8 (44.2)	7.4 (45.3)	8.9 (48.0)	10.0 (50.0)	11.7 (53.1)	14.0 (57.2)	11.2 (52.2)
Mean minimum °C (°F)	10.9 (51.6)	11.8 (53.2)	10.2 (50.4)	6.9 (44.4)	3.7 (38.7)	2.2 (36.0)	0.9 (33.6)	2.1 (35.8)	3.7 (38.7)	5.7 (42.3)	7.7 (45.9)	10.1 (50.2)	0.2 (32.4)
Record low °C (°F)	5.6 (42.1)	7.7 (45.9)	7.5 (45.5)	4.7 (40.5)	0.0 (32.0)	−0.5 (31.1)	−1.6 (29.1)	−1.3 (29.7)	−0.3 (31.5)	1.7 (35.1)	3.9 (39.0)	3.9 (39.0)	−1.6 (29.1)
Source: NIWA

== Education ==
Despite the low local population, Penrose is the site of the former Penrose High School, which in 2008 renamed itself One Tree Hill College, to shed the 'industrial' associations of the name. The school attracts many students from out of the suburb, many of its students coming from as far as 20 km away. The school is coeducational and has a roll of 1,472 as of July 2026.

The Auckland Japanese Supplementary School (AJSS; オークランド日本語補習学校 Ōkurando Nihongo Hoshūgakkō), a Japanese supplementary school, holds its classes at One Tree Hill College.

== Sport and recreation ==
Penrose is home to the New Zealand Warriors, who are based at Mount Smart Stadium.
