= Oranga =

- Suburb
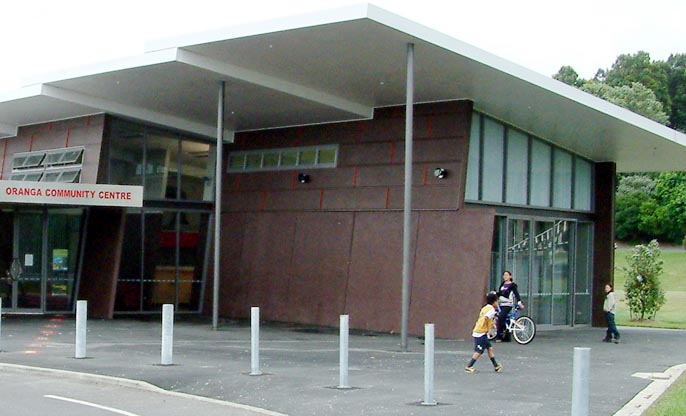
- Oranga Community Centre
- Interactive map of Oranga
- Coordinates: 36.911505°S 174.802473°E
- Country: New Zealand
- City: Auckland
- Local authority: Auckland Council
- Electoral ward: Maungakiekie-Tāmaki ward
- Local board: Maungakiekie-Tāmaki Local Board
- Board subdivision: Maungakiekie

Area
  - Land: 67 ha (170 acres)

Population (June 2025)
  - Total: 3,100
  - Density: 4,600/km^{2} (12,000/sq mi)

One Tree Hill	Greenlane	Ellerslie
Royal Oak	Oranga	Penrose
Onehunga	Onehunga	Te Papapa

Oranga is a small residential suburb in Auckland, New Zealand. It is located nine kilometres to the southeast of the city centre, between the commercial suburbs of Te Papapa and Penrose to the south and east, and the residential suburbs of One Tree Hill and Onehunga to the north and south.

Local facilities include Oranga Kindergarten (neighbouring Fergusson Domain), and Oranga School. The local secondary schools are One Tree Hill College, Marcellin College and Onehunga High School.

== Demographics ==
Oranga covers 0.67 km^{2} (0.26 sq mi) and had an estimated population of 3,100 as of June 2025, with a population density of 4,627 people per km^{2}.

Historical population
Year	Pop.	±% p.a.
2006	2,805	—
2013	2,952	+0.73%
2018	3,198	+1.61%
2023	2,772	−2.82%

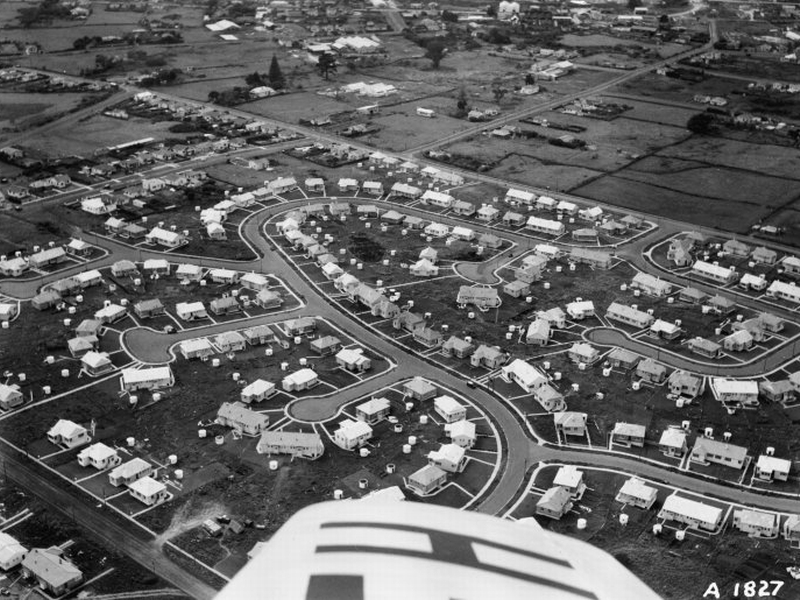
State houses in the 'Harp of Erin' estate in Oranga, seen in 1947. Note the typical suburban cul-de-sac layout.

Oranga had a population of 2,772 in the 2023 New Zealand census, a decrease of 426 people (−13.3%) since the 2018 census, and a decrease of 180 people (−6.1%) since the 2013 census. There were 1,326 males, 1,431 females and 15 people of other genders in 786 dwellings. 3.2% of people identified as LGBTIQ+. The median age was 31.6 years (compared with 38.1 years nationally). There were 648 people (23.4%) aged under 15 years, 672 (24.2%) aged 15 to 29, 1,200 (43.3%) aged 30 to 64, and 258 (9.3%) aged 65 or older.

People could identify as more than one ethnicity. The results were 32.8% European (Pākehā); 17.7% Māori; 47.5% Pasifika; 19.6% Asian; 2.2% Middle Eastern, Latin American and African New Zealanders (MELAA); and 1.1% other, which includes people giving their ethnicity as "New Zealander". English was spoken by 90.9%, Māori language by 3.6%, Samoan by 8.3%, and other languages by 30.1%. No language could be spoken by 3.4% (e.g. too young to talk). New Zealand Sign Language was known by 1.0%. The percentage of people born overseas was 34.5, compared with 28.8% nationally.

Religious affiliations were 48.8% Christian, 3.0% Hindu, 1.7% Islam, 1.6% Māori religious beliefs, 1.9% Buddhist, 0.2% New Age, 0.1% Jewish, and 1.8% other religions. People who answered that they had no religion were 33.3%, and 7.9% of people did not answer the census question.

Of those at least 15 years old, 513 (24.2%) people had a bachelor's or higher degree, 939 (44.2%) had a post-high school certificate or diploma, and 678 (31.9%) people exclusively held high school qualifications. The median income was $36,600, compared with $41,500 nationally. 189 people (8.9%) earned over $100,000 compared to 12.1% nationally. The employment status of those at least 15 was that 1,077 (50.7%) people were employed full-time, 201 (9.5%) were part-time, and 108 (5.1%) were unemployed.

Oranga Round Concrete Sheds

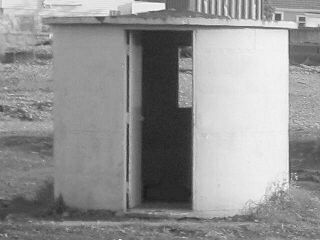
Oranga round concrete shed

The side photograph includes one of the two hundred or so unique concrete sheds built around 1947 in the vicinity of Oranga, Onehunga, Auckland. While their blueprints are possibly lost to time we know they were constructed of a base, cylinder, and roof using wood forms that will have been reused to begin the build process anew after each pouring, also their parts may have been built off-site and then assembled on location. The ceiling view had the appearance of the form being constructed like a cheese segment style rotation that was then poured and mounted atop with a slight overhang or eave around the outside. A single circular indent system was used to hold the roof in place atop the cylinder. These handy out-buildings featured a door and window opposite (upper four louvre with lower pane), with a small drainage hole at the floor wall corner below, while above outside the roof had a designed-in circular shallow v-gutter around the outer edge making for simple rain channeling with a drainage dip off to one side for water run-off. The roof could not be walked upon as the studfinder shows little or no reinforcing. The interior walls had around six vertical equally spaced planks attached for holding tools. The walls were around two and a half inches thick for the cylinder, and three inches for the roof section, and three for the base which sat in-line with the cylinder, Their large internal space measuring eight feet across the floor and seven feet to the apex above meant they could be used as a place for storage and or dispatching fowl back in the day. Slight banding and nail head indents can be seen around the exterior and interior walls where the wood forms had been erected for pouring day. The exterior was given a simple white coating.
