= Onehunga Branch =

Branch line between Penrose and Onehunga in Auckland

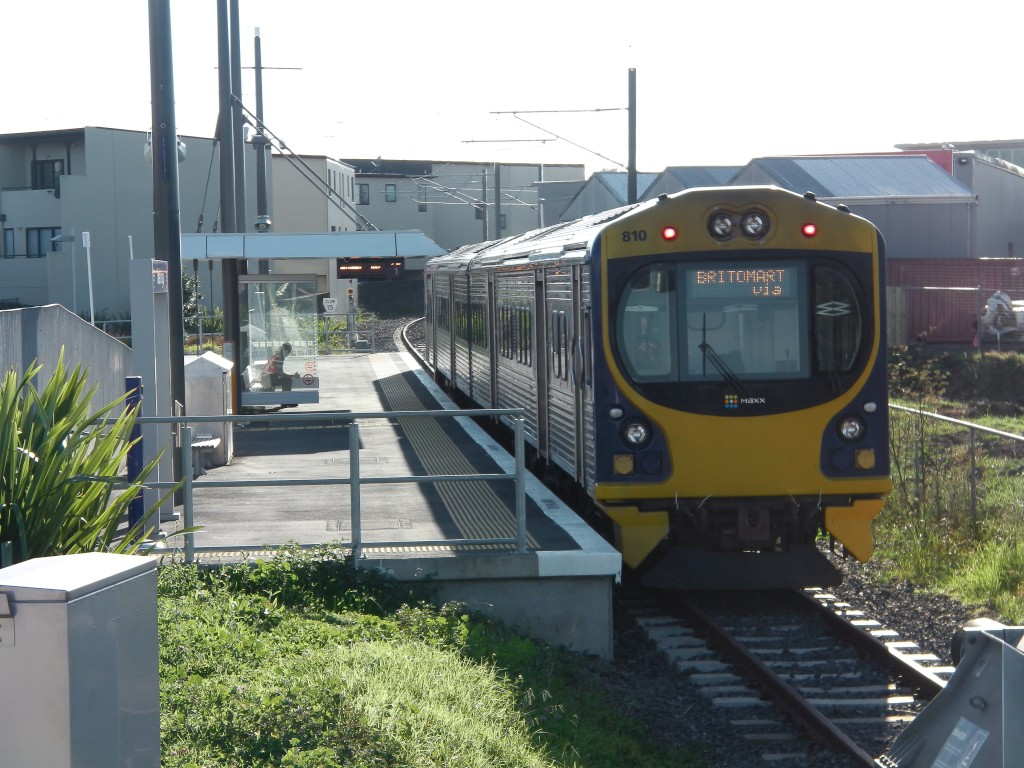
- ADL 810 diesel unit at Onehunga railway station, with electrification infrastructure partially installed

Overview
- Owner: KiwiRail
- Locale: Auckland, New Zealand
- Termini: Penrose; Onehunga
- Connecting lines: North Auckland Line
- Stations: 3

Service
- Type: Heavy rail
- Services: Onehunga West Line
- Operator: Auckland One Rail
- Rolling stock: AM class

History
- Opened: 24 December 1873; Reopened 18 September 2010
- Closed: 19 January 1973 (for passenger trains); 28 December 2006 (for freight trains)
- Reopened: 18 September 2010

Technical
- Line length: 3.31 km (2.06 mi)
- Num of tracks: Single
- Track gauge: 1,067 mm (3 ft 6 in)
- Electrification: 25 kV 50 Hz AC
- Operating speed: 60 km/h (37 mph) maximum

Map of the current route, including the former link to the Port of Onehunga.

The Onehunga Branch is a railway line in Auckland, New Zealand. It was constructed by the Auckland Provincial Government and opened from Penrose to Onehunga on 24 December 1873, and extended to Onehunga Wharf on 28 November 1878.

It was previously closed to passenger traffic on 19 January 1973, and mothballed in 2007. The section from Penrose to Onehunga was reopened on 18 September 2010, with regular passenger services beginning on 19 September 2010. It is 3.31 kilometres (2.06 mi) in length.

Onehunga West Line services run on the branch. Because it is single-track only, only one passenger train at a time is permitted, except in emergencies.

== History ==
=== Construction and original services ===
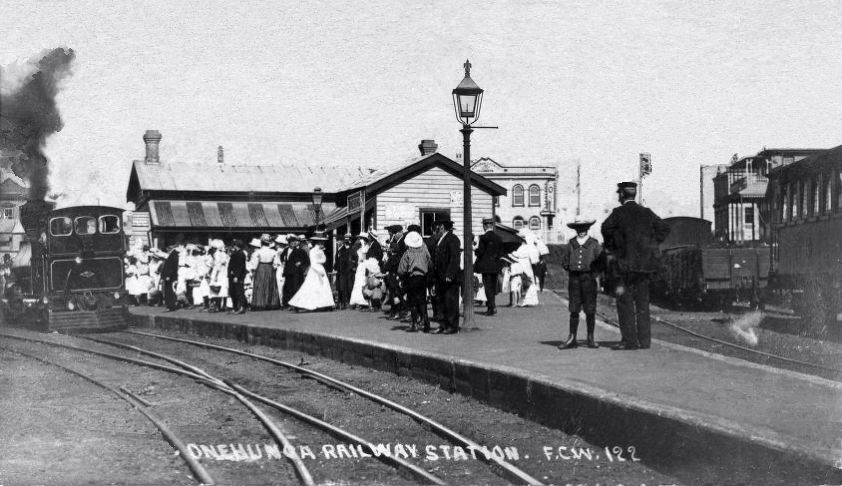
Onehunga railway station, c. 1873.

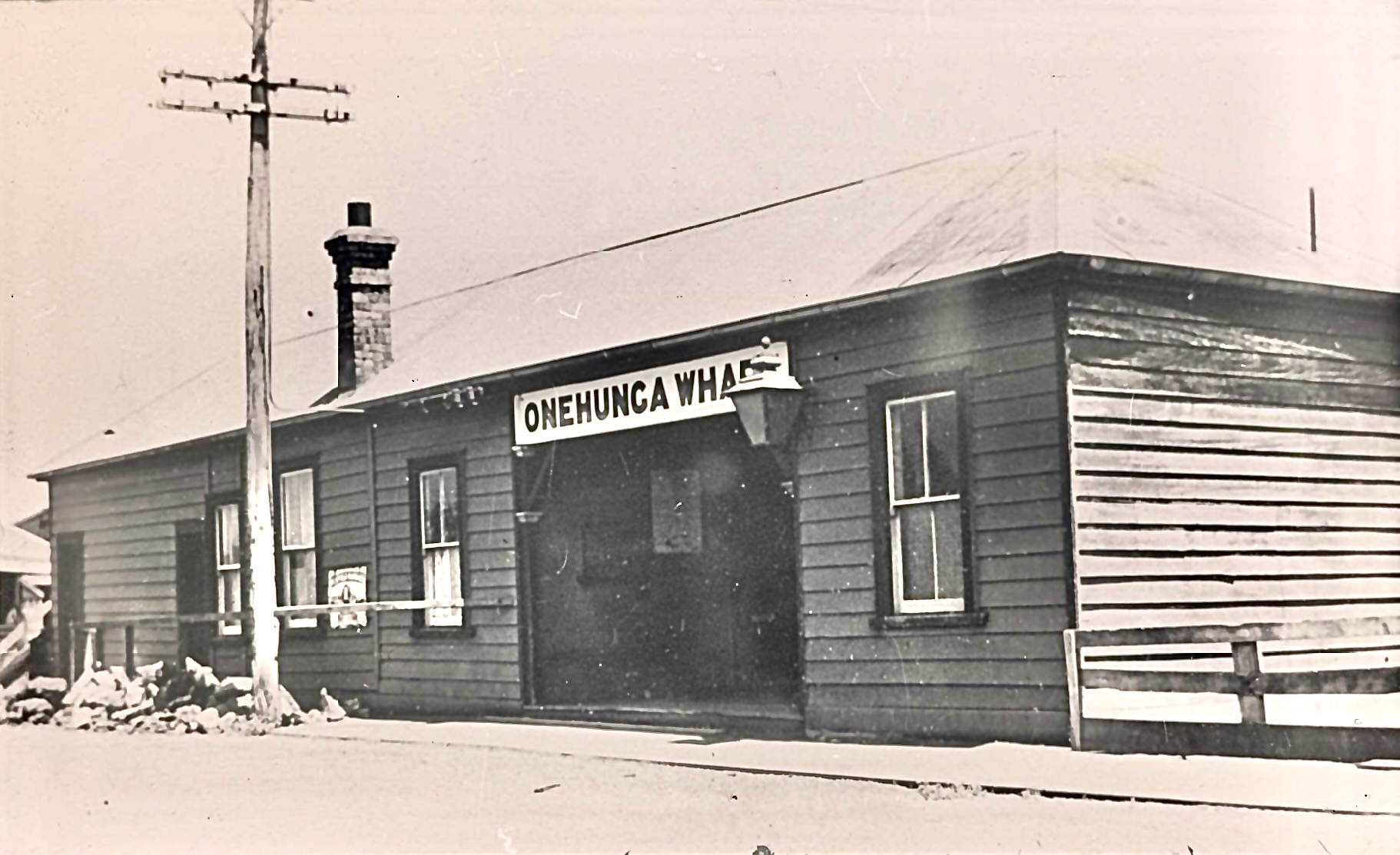
Onehunga Wharf railway station, c. 1920

The Onehunga Branch was part of one of the first government-funded railways in New Zealand. The Auckland and Drury Railway Act 1863 was passed by Parliament "to enable the Superintendent of the Province of Auckland to construct a Railway between the Towns of Auckland and Drury with a Branch to Onehunga in the said Province." Along with a further 10 km north to Auckland (now part of the North Auckland Line and the Newmarket Line), the Onehunga Branch was the first operating section of the railways in the North Island.

Construction began in 1865 under the auspices of Auckland's provincial government, to standard gauge, 4 ft 8 1/2 in (1,435 mm), but due to a lack of funds and disputes between the government and the contractors building the line, construction stalled two years later. The line featured in Julius Vogel's 1870 Great Public Works programme and construction resumed in 1872, to New Zealand's new narrow gauge of 3 ft 6 in (1,067 mm). With the dissolution of the provinces of New Zealand, the line was integrated into the state-run system on the creation of the New Zealand Railways Department.

Connecting the Port of Onehunga with Penrose and hence the port of Auckland, the line became a busy link between the two harbours of the rapidly expanding city. Onehunga was a busy port despite its treacherous harbour entrance and was well served by coastal shipping, some of which plied to New Plymouth. With the completion of the Wellington and Manawatu Railway Company's railway line in 1886, passengers from Auckland to Wellington rode a "Boat Train" from Auckland to Onehunga, connected with a steamer to New Plymouth, then the New Plymouth Express to Wellington. The boat trains ran to the wharf and in 1878 a small station was sited there and remained in use until 1927. By 1897 there were 14 trains daily, both passenger and mixed trains.

In 1903, electric trams were introduced between Auckland and Onehunga, running along Manukau Road, resulting in a significant drop in passenger patronage on the branch line. Also, Auckland and Wellington were directly connected by rail with the first scheduled services in February 1909 on the North Island Main Trunk line. The boat trains finished in the 1920s and the through service from Auckland to Onehunga in 1950, but passenger services from Penrose ran until April 1973. The line then served local industries until it was mothballed. Freight shunts continued to operate as far as Mays Rd until late 2007 and an annual enthusiasts excursion with ADL class DMU ran until 2006. Three visits by Silver Fern railcars occurred in 1996, 1999 and 2000. The last steam trains before closure was a series of excursions over Labour Weekend 1993 with a tank engine and carriages from Glenbrook Vintage Railway. J^{A} 1275 ran shuttle trains with DC 4536 on 18 September 2010 to celebrate the reopening of the line, before regular passenger services commenced the next day.

The original Onehunga Railway Station was on the corner of Princes Street and Onehunga Mall. The old station building has been relocated to 38 Alfred Street, not far away. It is owned by the Railway Enthusiasts Society, and used as their clubrooms and a railway museum. Other stations were at Te Papapa and Onehunga Wharf.

=== 2010 reopening ===
The campaign to reopen the line was launched by Auckland Regional Council (ARC) councillor Mike Lee in mid-2002. The cause was taken up by Campaign for Better Transport. Lee and CBT's concept was to rebuild the line, with new stations at Mount Smart, Te Papapa and Onehunga, and in mid-2006 CBT had received 8,000 signatures on a petition to reopen the line.

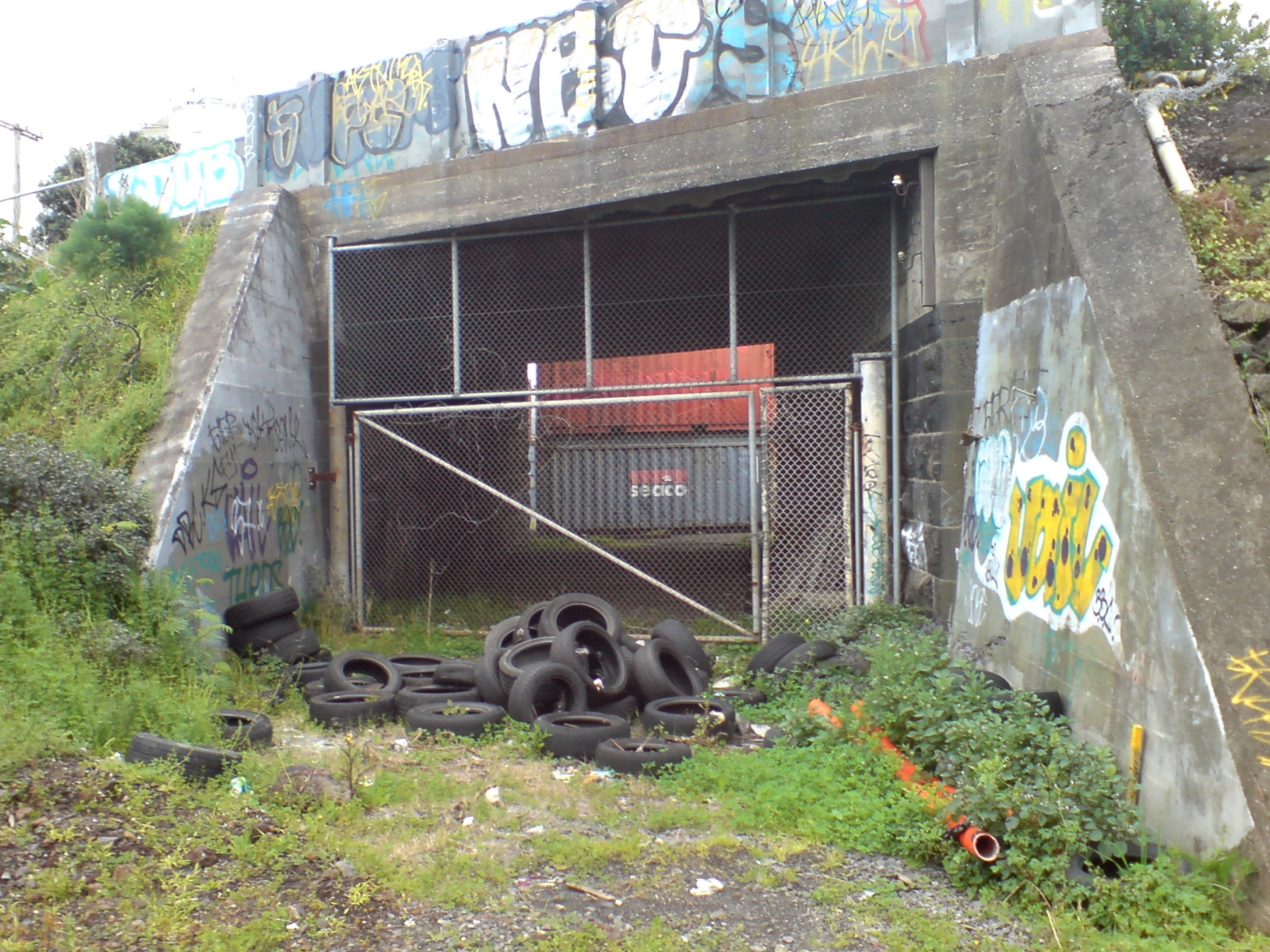
The blocked former underpass of the branch line at the Onehunga Port.

The petition was presented to the ARC, which formally endorsed it and passed it to its subsidiary, ARTA, recommending that passenger services should be started to both Onehunga and to Helensville. The petition was later handed back by ARTA to the ARC, with ARTA stating that the track was the responsibility of government track organisation, ONTRACK (now part of KiwiRail). The petition was presented to Parliament's Transport and Labour Relations Select Committee by Lee as Chairman of the ARC. On 13 March 2007 the Government announced that it had given approval for ONTRACK to spend $10 million on reopening the line for passengers and freight. As part of the rehabilitation work a private siding was built at the Owens truck depot.

In August 2007, coastal shipping firm Pacifica Shipping called for the section of the line between Onehunga Wharf and the end of the line at the Port of Onehunga to be reopened, to allow for export freight from the South Island to be unloaded at the wharf and transferred by rail to the Ports of Auckland on the Waitematā Harbour. Currently the freight is carried by road to the port, leading to delays due to traffic. A full freight service reopening could potentially remove around 200 containers to and 250 containers from the port per week from the local streets.

In 2009, the locations of stations on the branch were still to be determined by ARTA and ONTRACK. It was also unclear in May 2009 whether the reopened line would reach as far as Onehunga Mall (as originally planned) and it was noted that continuation to the port of Onehunga would depend on Ports of Auckland's willingness to fund a terminal within its land. However, detailed design for Te Papapa and Mount Smart stations was underway.

On 24 June 2009, ARTA and the NZ Transport Agency (NZTA) agreed to jointly fund three stations on the branch – Mount Smart, Te Papapa and Onehunga (on the site of the ITM, 109–113 Onehunga Mall). NZTA was to pay 60% of the $3.9 million cost of building the stations. The proposed station at Mount Smart was later dropped from the project.

In mid-2010, construction started on the terminal station at Onehunga, and its opening was delayed past its intended date to September 2010. Concern was raised that the new station would not be able to take three-car trains due to its short length, but ARTA responded by noting that initial usage predictions did not require three-car trains, and that the length of the platform could be extended later, though new consents would be needed.

On Saturday 18 September, reopening ceremonies were held, with Sunday 19 September being the first day of normal passenger services. The cost of reopening the line was about $21.6 million, of which KiwiRail contributed $10 million for track work and ARTA $3.6 million for three stations. The ARC also used $8 million to buy the site for the Onehunga station, where a 60-space park and ride facility was to open one week after the train services began.

Patronage on the line quickly grew to respectable levels, 1200 passengers a day in mid-2011, far exceeding computer transport modelling predicting only 340 passengers a day by 2016.

== Electrification ==
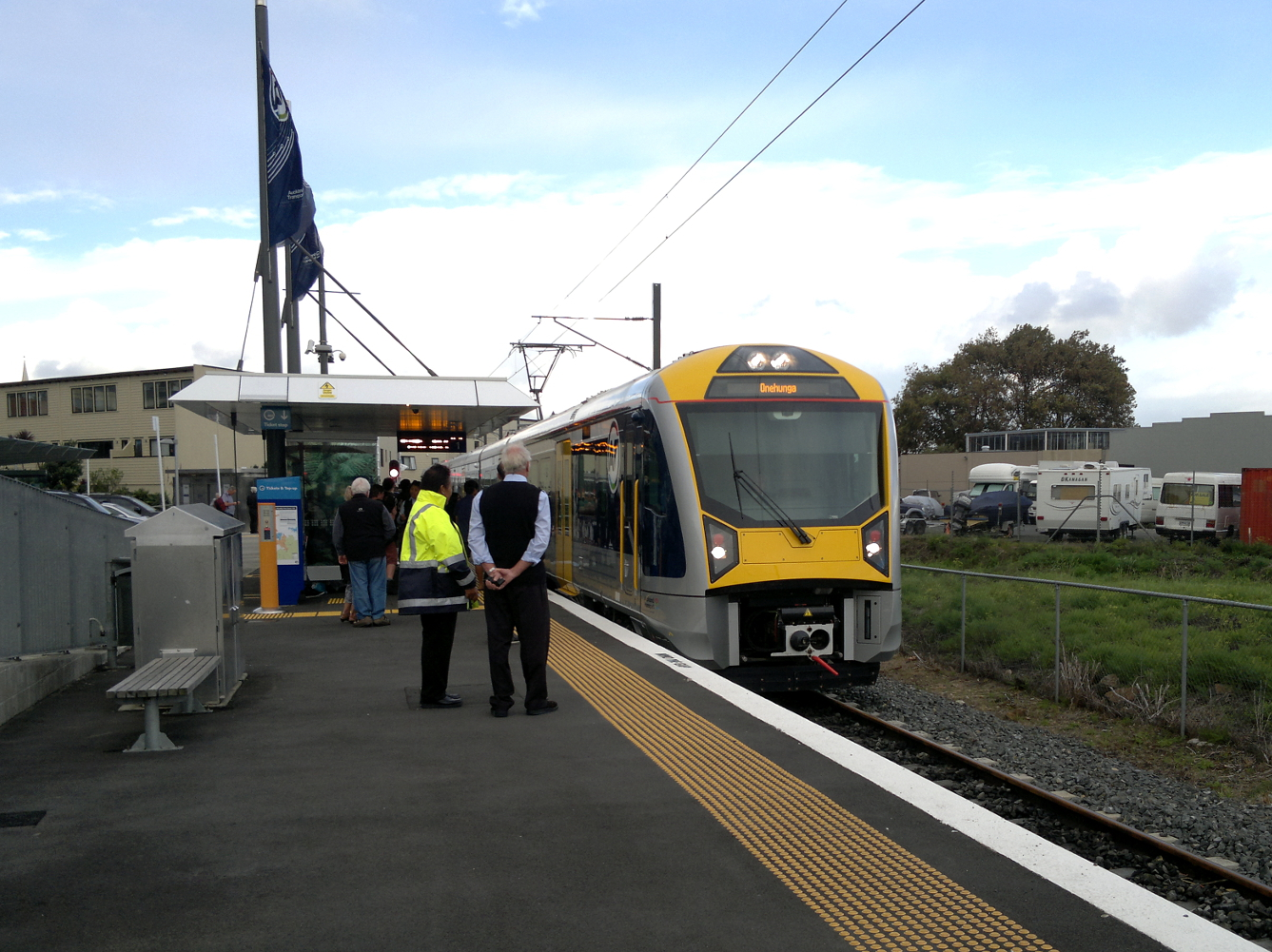
An EMU arrives at Onehunga railway station on its first day of public service

The Onehunga Line was the first to be upgraded as part of the Auckland railway electrification programme. Installation of overhead wires was completed during the summer shutdown of 2011–2012, stopping just short of Penrose. Electric services began running between Britomart and Onehunga on 28 April 2014.

== Potential future extension ==
Extension of the line to Auckland Airport has been proposed. The main barrier has been crossing Manukau Harbour between Onehunga and the suburb of Māngere Bridge. In early 2007, NZTA's predecessor Transit New Zealand announced that a project to double the width of the Māngere Bridge across the harbour would accommodate a rail link. The duplicate bridge was built to accommodate the link, and NZTA has provided for a rail corridor near the motorway as far as Walmsley Road.

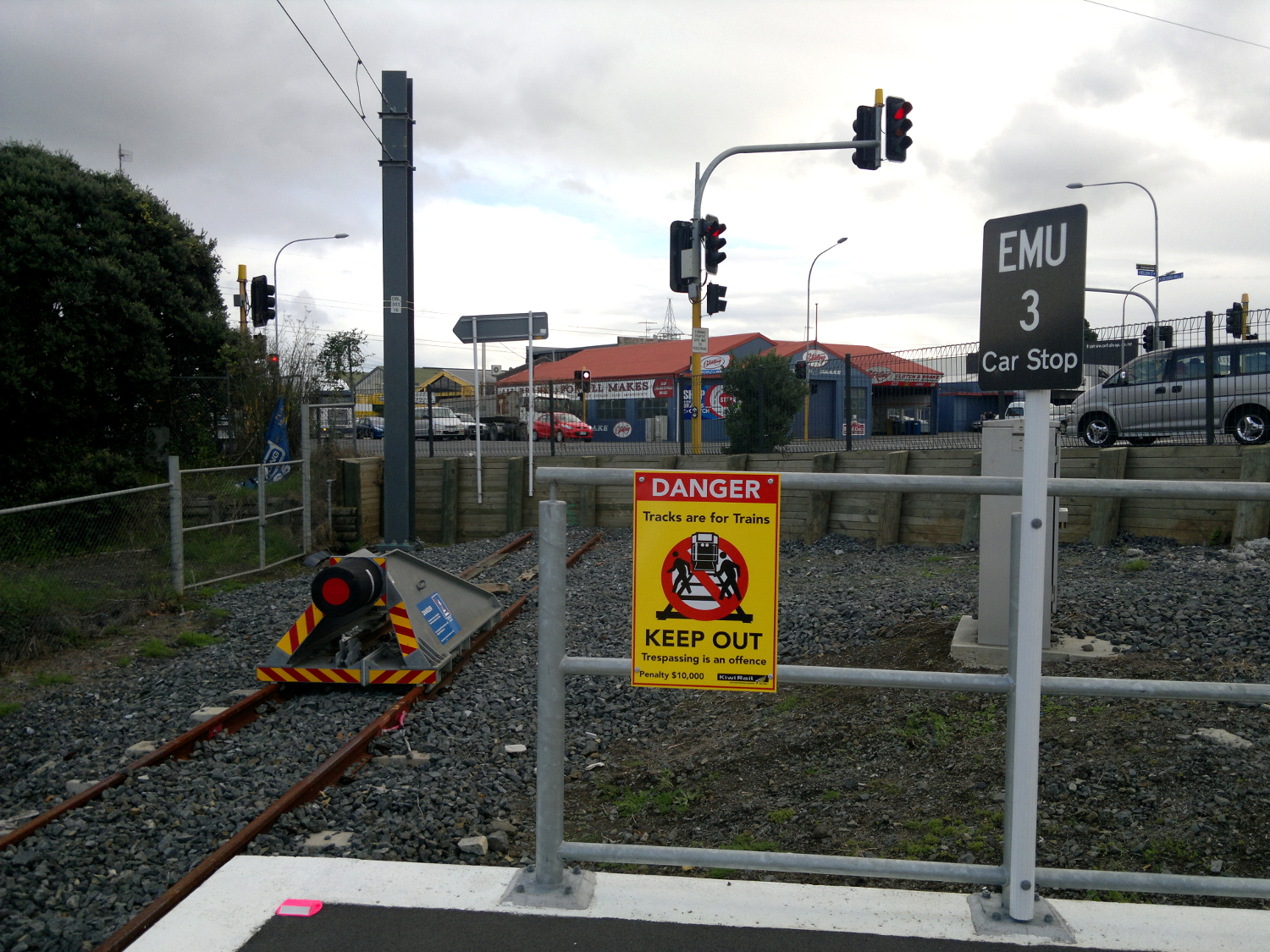
The current end point of the Onehunga Line.

However, in late 2016 soon after the election of Mayor Goff, the favoured Onehunga to airport rail corridor was blocked by AT when it demolished the Neilson Street overbridge immediately to the south of the Onehunga train station, putting the road straight across the rail corridor. This has effectively stymied any plan to extend the Onehunga Branch to the airport.

There is a proposal to build an Avondale–Southdown line, connecting the portion of the North Auckland Line on which Western Line services run, from near Avondale to Auckland Freight Centre at Southdown. KiwiRail owns most of the corridor, which leaves the North Auckland Line east of Avondale and follows Oakley Creek and the SH20 Waterview Connection motorway corridor (construction of which has made provision for the rail line's construction).

Another proposal is to connect the Onehunga Branch at Galway Street to the Avondale—Southdown line by building a tunnel under Onehunga Mall to meet Hugh Watt Drive (SH 20), connecting to the proposed route at Hillsborough.

== See also ==
- North Island Main Trunk
- North Auckland Line
- Newmarket Line
- Manukau Branch
- Riverhead Branch
- Waiuku/Mission Bush Branch
- Drury railway station
