= Penrose railway station, Auckland =

Train station in New Zealand

Penrose
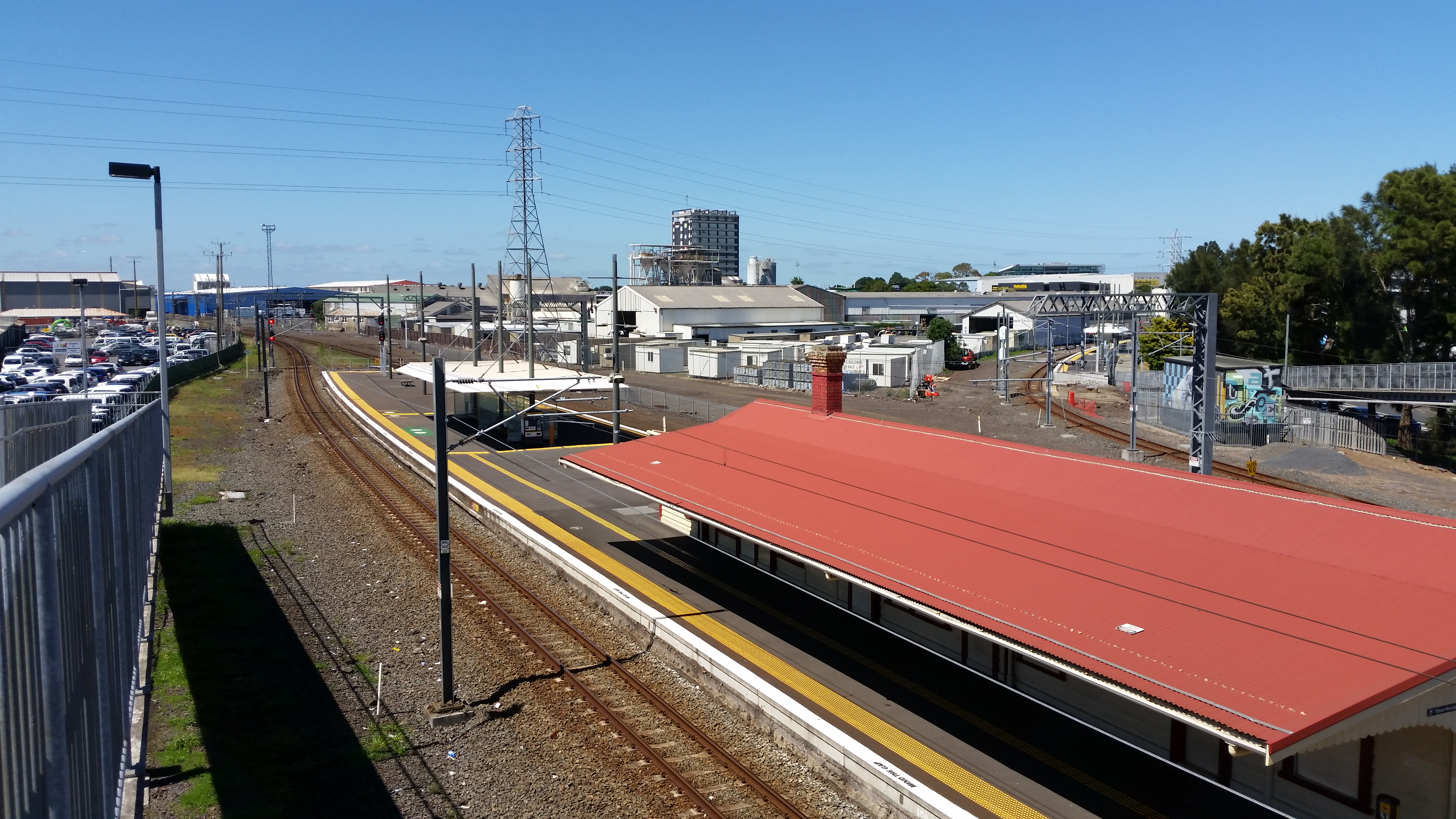
- The station in February 2018, looking southbound. The Onehunga Branch line curves off to its platform at right

General information
- Location: Penrose, Auckland; New Zealand
- Coordinates: 36°54.6′S 174°49.0′E
- System: Auckland Transport Urban rail
- Owner: KiwiRail (track and platforms); Auckland Transport (buildings)
- Operator: Auckland One Rail
- Lines: North Auckland Line (NAL); Onehunga Branch
- Distance: 2.63 km (1.63 mi) from Westfield Junction (NAL)
- Platforms: Island platform (P1 & P2); Side platform (P3)
- Tracks: 3

Construction
- Parking: Yes
- Cycle facilities: No
- Accessible: Yes

Other information
- Station code: PNR
- Fare zone: Isthmus

History
- Opened: 24 December 1873
- Rebuilt: 2010
- Electrified: April 2014

Passengers
- 2009: 475 passengers/day

Services
Preceding station	Auckland Transport (Auckland One Rail)	Following station
Ellerslie towards Henderson	Onehunga West Line	Te Papapa towards Onehunga
Ōtāhuhu towards Pukekohe	South City Line	Ellerslie towards Newmarket
Location

Penrose railway station is a station at Penrose, Auckland, on the South City line and Onehunga West line of the Auckland railway network, New Zealand. It is equipped with an island platform reached by pedestrian bridges from Great South Road and Station Road, and a side platform on Station Road.

Penrose station is at the junction of the Onehunga Branch railway with the North Auckland railway. The Onehunga Branch is single-track with no south-going junction at Penrose, and passengers transferring between Onehunga Line and Southern Line services must use the bridge on the Station Road side to cross from one platform to the other. In 2018, Platform Three was lengthened to enable six-car trains to stop at the platform.

In April 2011, the island platform was lengthened to accommodate longer suburban passenger trains, by raising the height of the platform around the old station building. On 28 April 2011, passenger trains began stopping under the station building shelter for the first time since 1993.

Penrose station is near Mount Smart Stadium, a major sports stadium and is used as the event station for events.

== Services ==
Auckland One Rail, on behalf of Auckland Transport, operates South City line and Onehunga West line services.

== See also ==
- List of Auckland railway stations
- Public transport in Auckland
