= Ōtara Creek =

Stream in Auckland, New Zealand

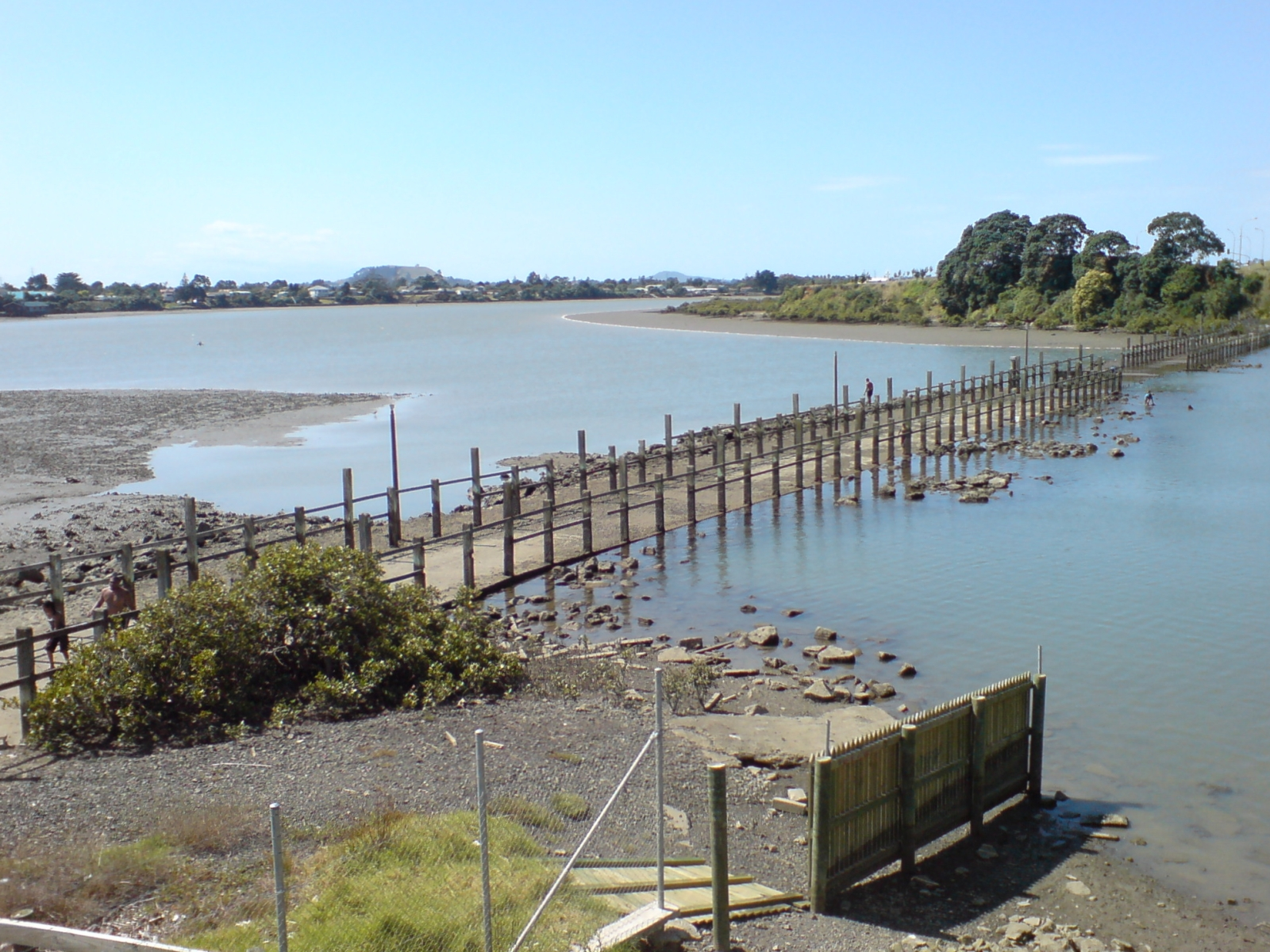
- The mouth of the creek as it enters the Tāmaki River

- Mouth of the Ōtara Creek Ōtara Creek (New Zealand)
- Route of the Ōtara Creek

Location
- Country: New Zealand
- Region: Auckland Region

Physical characteristics
- Source: Papatoetoe
  - coordinates: 36.97782°S 174.87351°E
- Mouth: Tāmaki River
  - coordinates: 36.94539°S 174.86224°E

Basin features
- Progression: Ōtara Creek → Tāmaki River → Tāmaki Strait → Hauraki Gulf → Pacific Ocean
- Bridges: Ōtara Creek Bridge, Ōtara Creek Pedestrian Bridge

The Ōtara Creek, is a major stream in South Auckland, in the Auckland Region of New Zealand's North Island. It flows northwards, then westwards into the Tāmaki River.

== Etymology ==
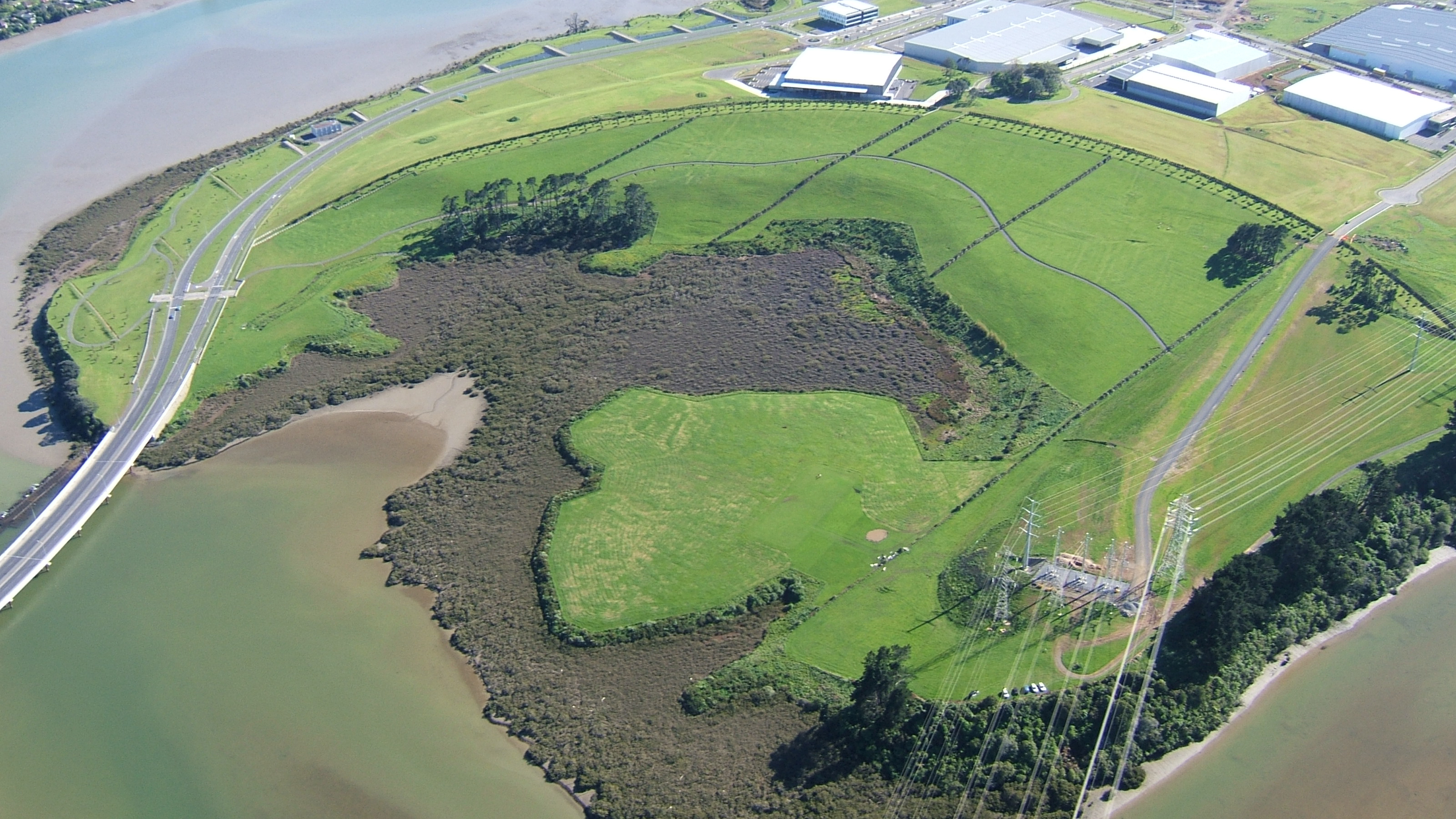
Pukewairiki, near the mouth of the Ōtara Creek

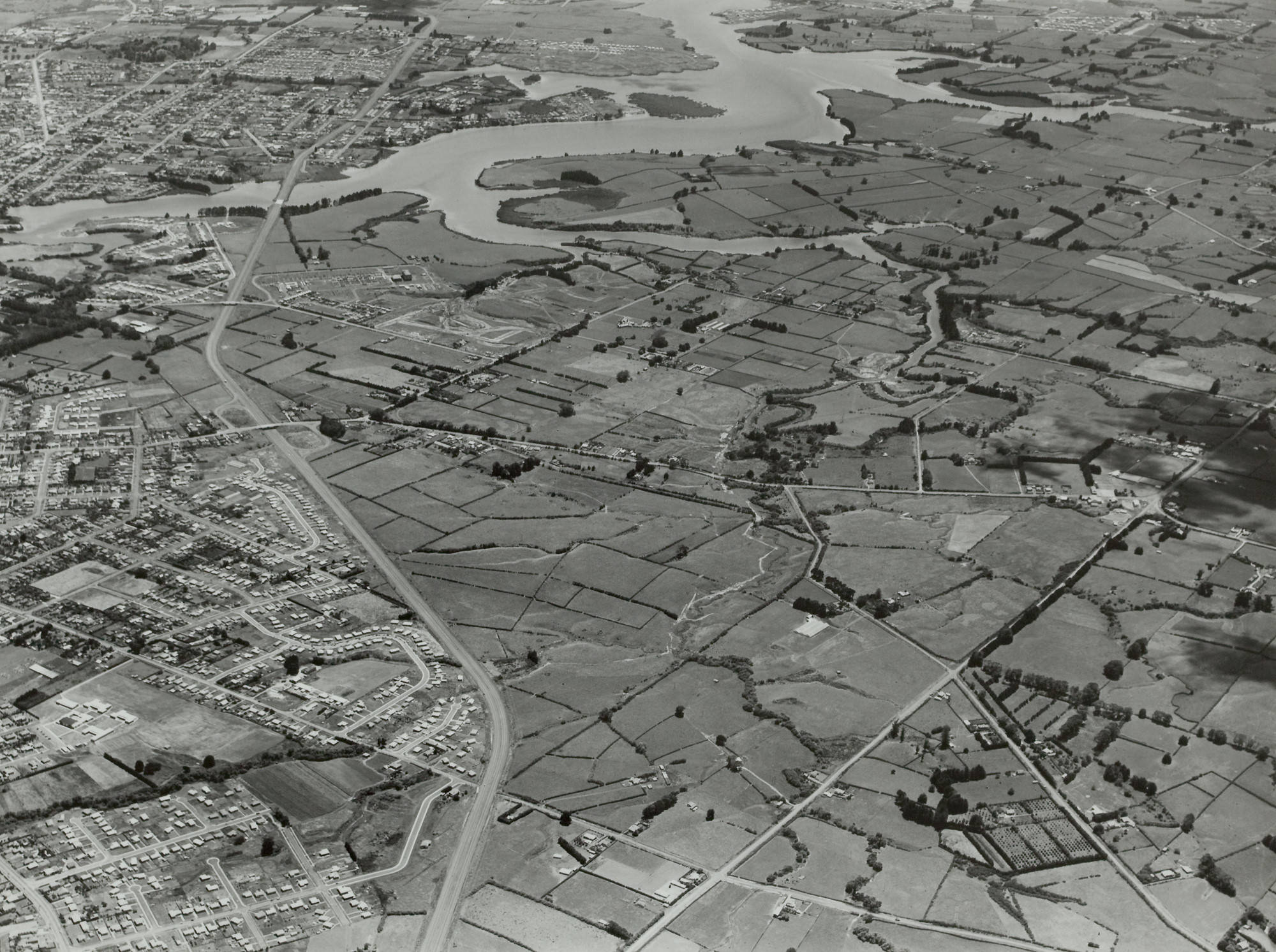
Aerial view of the Ōtara Creek in 1959

The name of the creek comes from its name in Māori, Te Waiōtara. The name literally means "The Waters of Tara", referencing Tara Te Irirangi, a Ngāi Tai ki Tāmaki rangatira of the early 19th Century. During the 19th and early 20th centuries, European farmers referred to the creek as Goodfellow's Creek.

== Description ==
The creek begins in Papatoetoe, near Allenby Park and Papatoetoe High School. It flows north through the suburbs of Papatoetoe and Ōtara, becoming a tidal estuary that separates Ōtara from East Tāmaki in the north. The tidal creek flows into Pukewairiki, a volcanic maar that erupted an estimated 130,000 years ago.

The creek's catchment covers an area of 3,477 hectares (8,590 acres).

== History ==
The creek is in the traditional rohe of Ngāi Tai ki Tāmaki. The stream was used as a source for freshwater resources, including koura and eels, and the banks of the stream were the location of many kāinga.

In 2007, a 210 metres (690 ft) bridge was constructed at the mouth of the creek along Highbrook Drive, as a new motorway exchange to connect East Tāmaki to the Auckland Southern Motorway.

In June 2016, the Ōtara Waterways & Lake Trust was formed, as a community organisation that focused on the clean-up and revitalisation of the creek.

== Amenities ==
The Ōtara Path is a major walking path on the western/southern banks of the creek. Ngāti Ōtara Park is a large park found on the southern banks of the creek. In 2020, a new public bridge was constructed at Ōtara Creek Reserve, crossing the creek.

== See also ==
- List of rivers of New Zealand
