= Tupou Manapori =

New Zealand local politician and language advocate

Tupou Manapori MNZM QSM
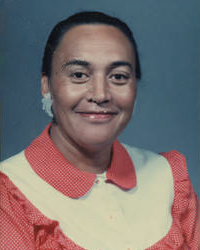

Academic work
- Institutions: Manukau Institute of Technology, Sir Edmund Hillary Collegiate

Tupou Here Tamata Manapori MNZM QSM is a Cook Island New Zealand teacher and Cook Islands Māori language advocate. In 1999, Manapori was appointed a Member of the New Zealand Order of Merit for services to local-body and community affairs. In 2009, she was awarded a Queen's Service Medal for services to the Pacific Islands community. In 2021 the Ministry for Pacific Peoples awarded her a Cook Islands Language Champion award.

== Early life and education ==
Manapori was born in Manihiki in the Cook Islands, where she lived with her grandparents. She qualified as a home economics teacher, and moved to New Zealand in 1968. As of 2009, she had lived in Māngere with her husband and three children for 25 years.

== Career ==
Manapori worked as a high school teacher, teaching technology, and later languages, at Kōwhai Intermediate School and Sir Edmund Hillary Collegiate in Ōtara. Manapori advocated the Cook Islands Māori language to be recognised through an NCEA qualification, and Hillary College became the first school to offer NCEA-level Te Reo Māori Kūki 'Āirani. After retiring from high school teaching, Manapori currently teaches at Manukau Institute of Technology.

Manapori served on the Ōtara Community Board for sixteen years. In 1983 she stood for the local council, and was elected to Manukau City Council in the Ōtara ward. She was the first Pacific Islands councillor elected in Manukau, and served on council until 1992. Manapori was a founding member and Chair of the council's Pacific Islands Advisory Committee, which was formed in 1991 to give advice to the council on issues affecting the Pacific community.

== Honours and awards ==
In the 1999 New Year Honours, Manapori was appointed a Member of the New Zealand Order of Merit for services to local-body and community affairs. In the 2009 New Year Honours, she was awarded a Queen's Service Medal for services to the Pacific Islands community. In 2015 she was awarded a Pacific Community Leadership Award at the inaugural SunPix Pacific Peoples’ Awards. During Cook Islands Language Week in 2021 Manapori was awarded by the Ministry for Pacific Peoples as one of five Cook Islands Language Champions.
