= Tara Te Irirangi =

Paramount chief of Ngāi Tai ki Tāmaki

- Paramount chief of Ngāi Tai ki Tāmaki
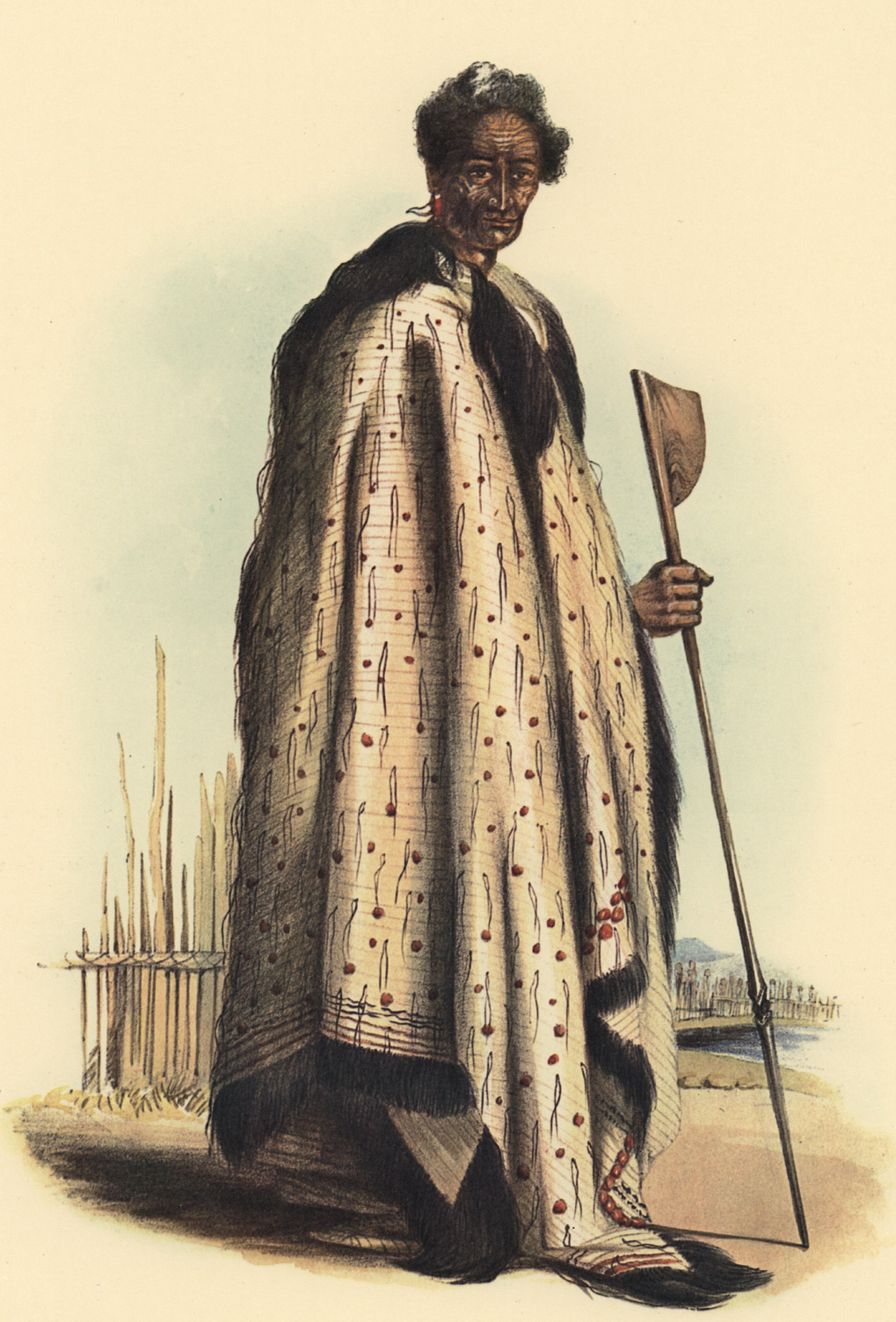
- Portrait of Tara Te Irirangi, drawn by George French Angus, from the 1840s
- Born: c. 1780
- Died: 1852

Tara Te Irirangi (1780s–1852) also known as Te Tara ki Moehau or Ōtara Te Irirangi, was paramount chief of Ngāi Tai ki Tāmaki or Ngāti Tai, a Māori tribe of the eastern Auckland region of New Zealand, encompassing parts of the Hauraki Gulf and Wairoa Valley, as well as Ōtara, Clevedon, Maraetai and Howick. Te Irirangi was the great-grandson of Te Wana, a leading rangatira and well-known warrior of Ngāi Tai, who, during his life, strengthened Ngāi Tai control over the Maraetai-Wairoa area. Tara Te Irirangi died in 1852, after falling ill, his daughter Ngeungeu having been kidnapped by Nga Puhi who sided with the crown to arrange a marriage to a Scotsman losing her Mother tongue as arranged by the crown, extradited her from her father, he died at the mouth of the Wairoa River. He was interred in his waka in the Ngāi Tai burial swamps within the west bank of the river.

== Early leadership ==
Prior to his time as ariki (paramount chief), Te Irirangi looked over neighbouring Ngāi Tai settlements, including Te Puke ō Tara (Ōtara Hill) and Te Wai ō Tara (Ōtara Creek). Te Irirangi first achieved recognition during his youth in the late warfare of the late 18th-century as a toa rangatira (leading warrior), and from the early 1800s he was the commander in chief of the warriors of Ngāi Tai. In 1807, Tara Te Irirangi led Ngāi Tai and Ngāti Tai warriors south, to support their Tainui relatives of Waikato at Te Mangeo, in a battle known as Te Hingakākā, best remembered as "the largest battle ever fought on New Zealand soil".

== Musket Wars ==
Tara Te Irirangi was the paramount chief during the early years of Pākehā settlement in the Tāmaki region, and also during the Musket Wars of the 1820s. One notable incident involving Te Irirangi occurred in 1821 during the Musket Wars, when a Ngāpuhi detachment led by Patuone, a Ngāti Hao chief, arrived in Maraetai with the intention of attacking Ngāi Tai. Upon meeting with Te Irirangi, it was discovered that through intermarriages with Ngāti Huarere, both groups shared whakapapa from their Te Arawa ancestors. Once learning this connection, Patuone forbade his people from attacking. Ngāi Tai was later attacked by a Parawhau war party led by Te Tirarau, targeting Te Tōtara Pā during which Tara Te Irirangi was away procuring muskets. Following this invasion, many women and children were captured and taken north, including two of Te Irirangi's daughters – Te Whakakōhu and Ngeungeu. While in the Bay of islands, Ngeungeu married Thomas Maxwell, a well-known trader in the area. They later lived on Waiheke Island, prior to Maxwell's death in April 1842.

== Land sales ==
Te Irirangi did not sign Te Tiriti o Waitangi, however this did not mean that he did not desire relationships with European settlers. In fact, prior to the signing of Te Tiriti, Te Irirangi, as a Ngāi Tai rangatira, was involved in land transactions relating to Motutapu and other inner-Gulf islands. On 11 January 1840, Te Irirangi was one of six chiefs involved in the sale of the islands of Motutapu, Hurakia (Rakino), Otata, and Motu Horopapa (Noises), to Thomas Maxwell, a prominent Scottish trader and boat builder in the Hauraki Gulf area, and Te Irirangi's son in law. Te Irirangi was not fairly compensated for this sale, and refused to relinquish part of Motutapu, nor Hurakia or Otata, until payment was received. This did not occur, and Tara Te Irirangi was not compensated until awarded a Crown Grant in 1845. In 1844, Te Irirangi, alongside his nephew Wātene Te Makuru, made the first land sale to settlers in the area, approximately 2500 acres opposite Clevedon Village, to the Cleghorn and Goodfellow families.

== Family and descendants ==
Tara Te Irirangi had at least one sister, named Te Rangitakerehau, who married Te Wharerau of Ngāti Tāwhaki & Te Urikaraka. He also had at least three children, two daughters, named Te Whakakōhu and Ngeungeu, and one son, named Honetana. Te Whakakōhu married Tirarau, while Ngeungeu married Thomas Maxwell. Following the death of Tara Te Irirangi and other rangatira, Honetana Te Irirangi, alongside others, maintained leadership of Ngāi Tai throughout the Waikato Wars, and died in the 1870s.

Descendants of Tara Te Irirangi include Rachael Ngeungeu Te Irirangi Beamish (1893–1997), a Ngāi Tai and Ngāti Paoa community leader and early member of the Māori Women's Welfare League.

== Legacy ==
Multiple sites in the Auckland region are named after Tara Te Irirangi, these include:

- Ōtara (suburb in South Auckland)
- Irirangi Road, Greenlane (renamed from 'Prospect Road' in 1938)
- Te Irirangi Drive, Auckland (an arterial road opened in 1999, formerly known as the East Tamaki Central Arterial Route Transport (ETCART))
- Following the creation of the Auckland Super City in 2010, the Local Government Commission named the ward of Howick, Pakuranga, and Botany, 'Te Irirangi', due to the historical significance of Tara Te Irirangi within the East Auckland area. Backlash from the community occurred immediately, and the ward has since been renamed 'Howick.
