= Sir Edmund Hillary Collegiate =

Location
- 2 Franklyne Road, Ōtara; 36.9507°S 174.8764°E

Information
- Type: State co-ed secondary, intermediate and contributing
- Motto: Towards Far Horizons
- Opened: 2004; 22 years ago
- Ministry of Education Institution no.: 97
- Chairperson: Tua Amerika
- Grades: 0–13
- Enrolment: 664 (senior school) (July 2026)
- Socio-economic decile: 1A
- Website: sehc.school.nz

Sir Edmund Hillary Collegiate is a school in Ōtara, Auckland, New Zealand. The school was formed in 2004, when Hillary College, Bairds Intermediate School and Clydemore Primary School joined together. There are three distinct schools on the one campus, which was opened by Sir Edmund Hillary, after whom it is named, in 2004. Hillary College opened in 1966 and was named Otara College until 1969.

The Ministry of Education institution number for the senior school is 588. The numbers for the intermediate and junior schools are 1217 and 1251.

On 29 January 2009, Education Minister Anne Tolley sacked the board of trustees at the collegiate, following an Education Review Office report and claims of teachers physically and verbally abusing students within the Senior school. Since then the school elected a new board of trustees.

== Demographics ==
In 2015 Education Review Office (ERO) reported that the collegiate has one board but three principals - one each for its junior, middle and senior schools - and is struggling despite ongoing support.

In March 2017 ERO had carried out an assessment and revealed that Sir Edmund Hillary Junior School (Year 1–6) had an evenly split gender gap (50% male 50% female). Of them, 38% were Samoan, 23% Tongan, 22% Māori, 11% from Cook Islands and 1% was from Niue. Its Middle counterpart (Year 7–8) had 1% less of Samoans and 8% less of Tongans but had 2% more of Niue and two times as much of Cook Islanders. The gender gap was slightly uneven at 51% female and 49% male respectively. The Senior part of the school (Year 9-13) had a gender gap of 53% female and 47% male out of which 40% are Samoan, 22% are Tongan, 15% are Cook Islands Māoris and 3% was of other ethnicity. The population of Māori at both Junior and Middle schools was at 22% while Senior had only 20%.

== Notable alumni ==
- Dean Bell, rugby league player
- Tupou Manapori, language advocate
- Carlos Ulberg, UFC Light Heavyweight Champion
- Manu Vatuvei, rugby league player
- Ruben Wiki, rugby league player
