= Ōtara =

- Suburb
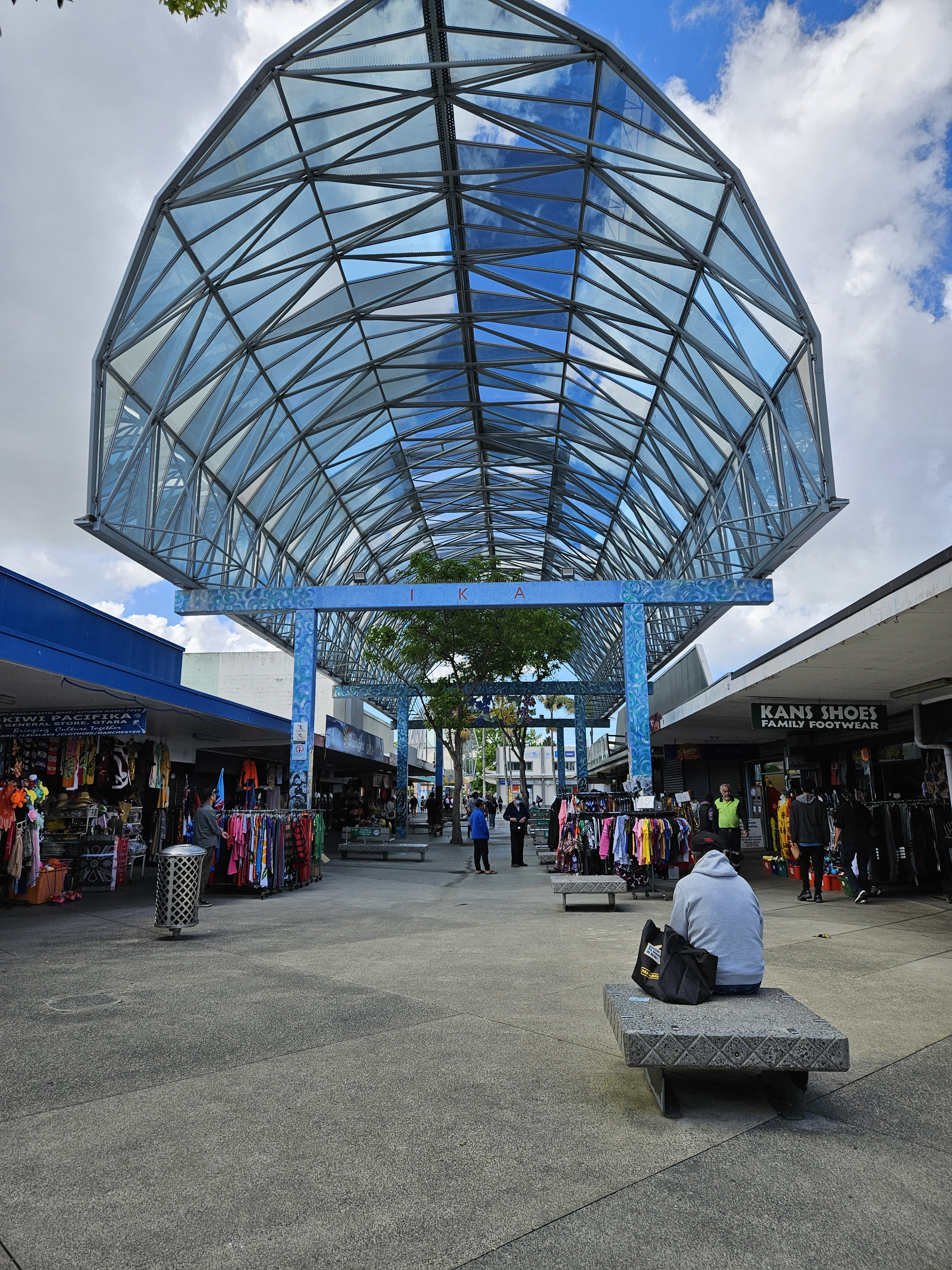
- The central section of Fish Canopy, a 1987 sculpture in the Ōtara Town Centre
- Interactive map of Ōtara
- Coordinates: 36°57′39″S 174°52′28″E
- Country: New Zealand
- City: Auckland
- Local authority: Auckland Council
- Electoral ward: Manukau ward
- Local board: Ōtara-Papatoetoe Local Board

Area
  - Land: 680 ha (1,700 acres)

Population (June 2025)
  - Total: 23,510
  - Density: 3,500/km^{2} (9,000/sq mi)

Ōtāhuhu	East Tāmaki	East Tāmaki
Middlemore	Ōtara	Flat Bush
Papatoetoe	Clover Park	Clover Park

Ōtara is a suburb of South Auckland, New Zealand (formerly Manukau City), situated 18 kilometres to the southeast of the Auckland City Centre. Ōtara lies near the head of the Tāmaki River. The area is traditionally part of the rohe of Ngāi Tai ki Tāmaki, and the name Ōtara refers to Ōtara Hill / Te Puke ō Tara, a former Ngāi Tai ki Tāmaki pā and volcanic hill to the north of the suburb. From 1851 to 1910 the area was part of the Goodfellow family farm, and during the 1910s the area was an agricultural college run by the Dilworth Trust.

After the construction of the Auckland Southern Motorway in the 1950s, Ōtara developed as a suburb, primarily as part of a state housing project by the New Zealand Government.

== Etymology ==
Ōtara, meaning "The Place of Tara", is a shortened form of Ōtara Hill / Te Puke ō Tara, the volcanic hill previously found to the north of the suburb. The hill is either named for the Waiohua ancestor and taniwha of the Manukau Harbour, Tara-mai-nuku, or for the 19th century paramount chief of Ngāi Tai ki Tāmaki, Tara Te Irirangi. An earlier name applied to the area was Ngā Kopi o Toi ('The Karaka Berries of Toi'), named for a karaka grove said by tradition to have been brought to Tamaki from the Chatham Islands and planted in the vicinity of Greenmount by Toi-te-huatahi. During European settlement, the name Ōtara became associated with the area in the 1850s.

== Geography ==
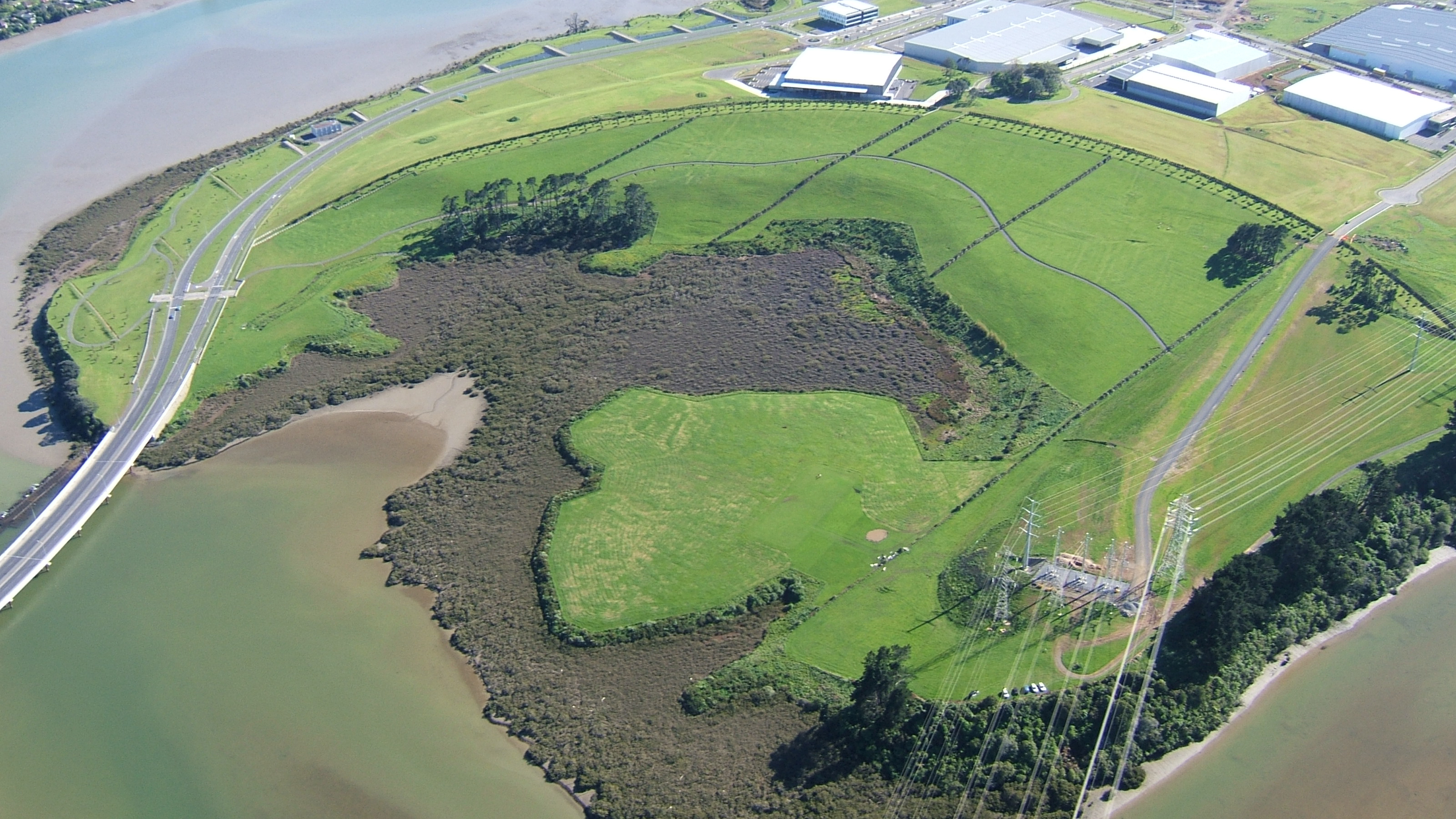
Pukewairiki is a volcanic maar found in the Ōtara Creek

Ōtara is found in South Auckland at the south-eastern headlands of the Tāmaki River, primarily to the north-east of the Auckland Southern Motorway. The Ōtara Creek runs through the suburb, becoming a tidal estuary of the Tāmaki River in the north.

There are two features of the Auckland Volcanic Field in the area. Pukewairiki is an estuary of the Ōtara Creek and a volcanic maar that erupted an estimated 130,000 years ago. Ōtara Hill / Te Puke o Tara is a volcano located to the north in East Tāmaki that erupted an estimated 56,500 years ago, and was quarried in the mid-20th century. Lava flows from the hill flowed as far south as the Ōtara Town Centre.

=== Climate ===
Climate data for Ōtara (1971–1986 normals, extremes 1952–1986)
Month	Jan	Feb	Mar	Apr	May	Jun	Jul	Aug	Sep	Oct	Nov	Dec	Year
Record high °C (°F)	28.6 (83.5)	30.0 (86.0)	29.5 (85.1)	25.7 (78.3)	22.8 (73.0)	20.6 (69.1)	19.0 (66.2)	19.6 (67.3)	20.8 (69.4)	22.9 (73.2)	26.0 (78.8)	28.0 (82.4)	30.0 (86.0)
Mean maximum °C (°F)	27.1 (80.8)	27.2 (81.0)	25.9 (78.6)	23.5 (74.3)	20.5 (68.9)	18.8 (65.8)	17.5 (63.5)	18.0 (64.4)	19.3 (66.7)	21.2 (70.2)	23.4 (74.1)	25.3 (77.5)	27.9 (82.2)
Mean daily maximum °C (°F)	23.7 (74.7)	24.1 (75.4)	23.1 (73.6)	20.4 (68.7)	17.4 (63.3)	15.3 (59.5)	14.5 (58.1)	15.2 (59.4)	16.3 (61.3)	17.7 (63.9)	19.9 (67.8)	21.9 (71.4)	19.1 (66.4)
Daily mean °C (°F)	19.2 (66.6)	19.5 (67.1)	18.4 (65.1)	15.7 (60.3)	12.0 (53.6)	11.0 (51.8)	10.0 (50.0)	10.9 (51.6)	12.3 (54.1)	13.7 (56.7)	15.8 (60.4)	17.5 (63.5)	14.7 (58.4)
Mean daily minimum °C (°F)	14.6 (58.3)	14.8 (58.6)	13.7 (56.7)	10.9 (51.6)	8.3 (46.9)	6.6 (43.9)	5.4 (41.7)	6.6 (43.9)	8.3 (46.9)	9.6 (49.3)	11.7 (53.1)	13.1 (55.6)	10.3 (50.5)
Mean minimum °C (°F)	8.6 (47.5)	9.4 (48.9)	7.2 (45.0)	4.4 (39.9)	0.8 (33.4)	−0.8 (30.6)	−1.6 (29.1)	0.0 (32.0)	1.8 (35.2)	3.0 (37.4)	5.5 (41.9)	7.4 (45.3)	−2.2 (28.0)
Record low °C (°F)	4.2 (39.6)	5.2 (41.4)	1.6 (34.9)	0.0 (32.0)	−2.0 (28.4)	−3.8 (25.2)	−4.1 (24.6)	−3.7 (25.3)	−1.6 (29.1)	−0.3 (31.5)	1.6 (34.9)	3.3 (37.9)	−4.1 (24.6)
Average rainfall mm (inches)	79.1 (3.11)	84.1 (3.31)	83.9 (3.30)	108.4 (4.27)	103.7 (4.08)	128.9 (5.07)	119.8 (4.72)	92.3 (3.63)	108.3 (4.26)	85.7 (3.37)	81.2 (3.20)	95.4 (3.76)	1,170.8 (46.08)
Source: Earth Sciences NZ (rainfall 1971–2000)

== History ==
=== Māori history ===
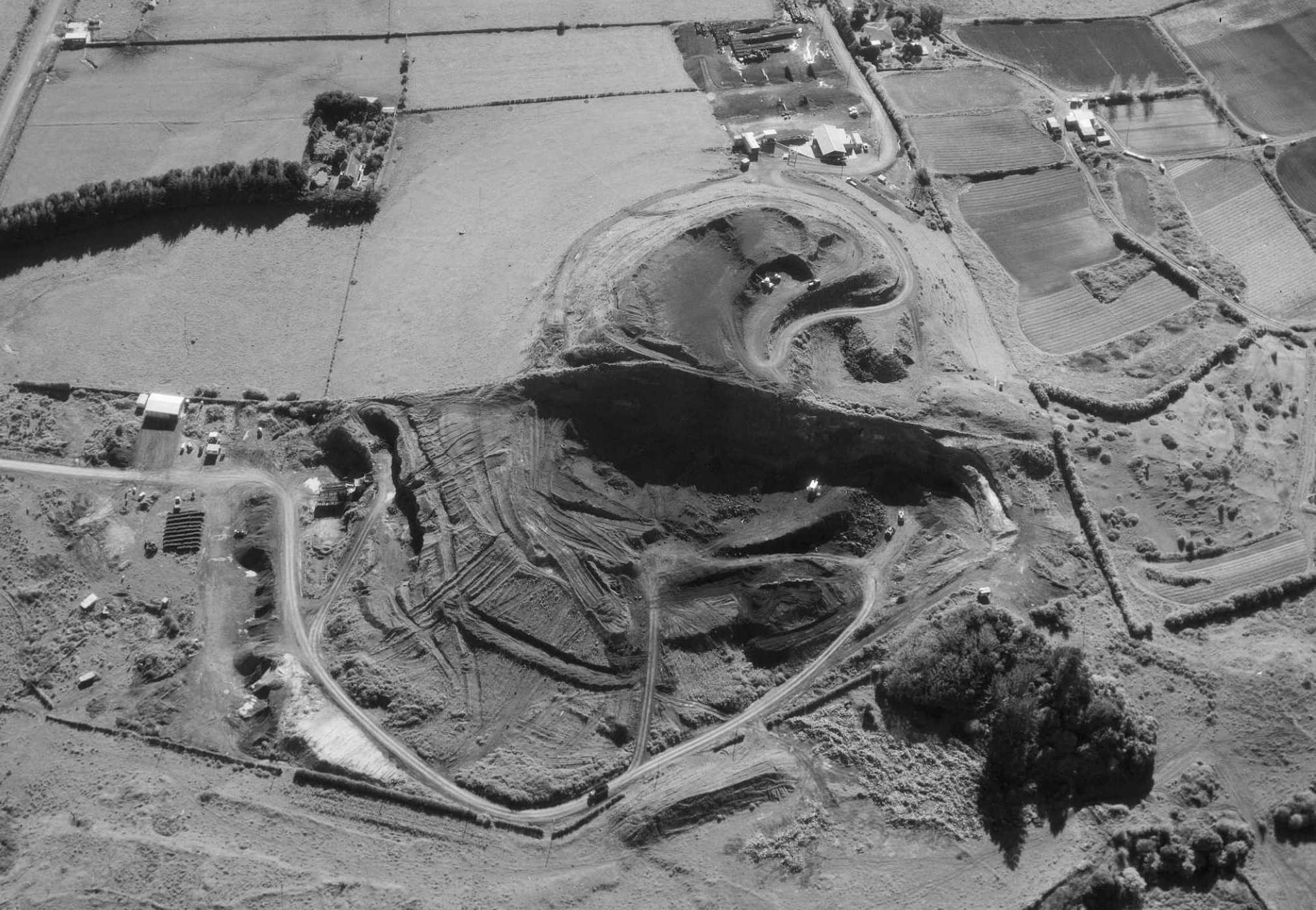
A 1958 view of Ōtara Hill / Te Puke ō Tara, the namesake of the suburb and a Ngāi Tai ki Tāmaki pā site that has since been quarried

The Ōtara area is part of the rohe of Ngāi Tai ki Tāmaki, who descend from the crew of the Tainui migratory waka, who visited the area around the year 1300. The mouth of the Tāmaki River was traditionally known as Te Wai ō Tāiki ("The Waters of Tāiki"), named after the Ngāi Tai ancestor Tāiki. Tāiki settled with his followers along the eastern shores of the Tāmaki River, alongside the descendants of Huiārangi of the early iwi Te Tini ō Maruiwi. The upper reaches of the river near modern was traditionally known as Te Wai Mokoia, referring to Mokoikahikuwaru, a protector taniwha of the Tainui waka who is described in legends as taking up residence at the Panmure Basin. The area is close to the portages where waka could be easily taken over land between the Manukau Harbour and Tāmaki River, including Te Tō Waka at Ōtāhuhu and Waokauri / Pūkaki portage at Papatoetoe.

Ngāi Tai created extensive cultivations along the eastern shores of the Tāmaki River. The area around Te Waiōtara (Ōtara Creek) and Ōtara Hill / Te Puke ō Tara was home to the extensive stonefield gardens and a fortified pā, occupied up until the early 19th century. Over time, with the emergence and expansion of later hapū/sub group of Iwi and iwi identities, Ngāti Tai occupying the area of Tara became closely interlinked by marriages with Te Akitai, Ngāti Tamaoho and Ngāti Kahu of the Tāmaki Makaurau (Auckland) confederation of tribes known collectively as Te Wai ō Hua, and with the Hauraki Gulf peoples of Ngāti Pāoa and Ngāti Tamaterā, among others. The Ngāti Pāoa chieftain Hauauru noted in 1851 that by the mid-1830s Ngāti Pāoa, Ngāti Tamaterā and Te Akitai had competing interests in Ōtara. While all of these groups hold ancestral relationships to the Ōtara area, Ngāi Tai continue to retain recognised mana whenua status.

During the Musket Wars in the 1820s, Ngāi Tai sought temporary refuge in the Waikato. When English missionary William Thomas Fairburn visited the area in 1833, it was mostly unoccupied.

In 1836, William Thomas Fairburn brokered a land sale between Tāmaki Māori chiefs covering the majority of modern-day South Auckland and East Auckland. The sale was envisioned as a way to end hostilities in the area, but it is unclear what the chiefs understood or consented to. Māori continued to live in the area, unchanged by this sale. In 1854 when Fairburn's purchase was investigated by the New Zealand Land Commission, a Ngāi Tai reserve was created around the Wairoa River and Umupuia areas, and as a part of the agreement, members of Ngāi Tai agreed to leave their traditional settlements to the west.

=== European settlement ===
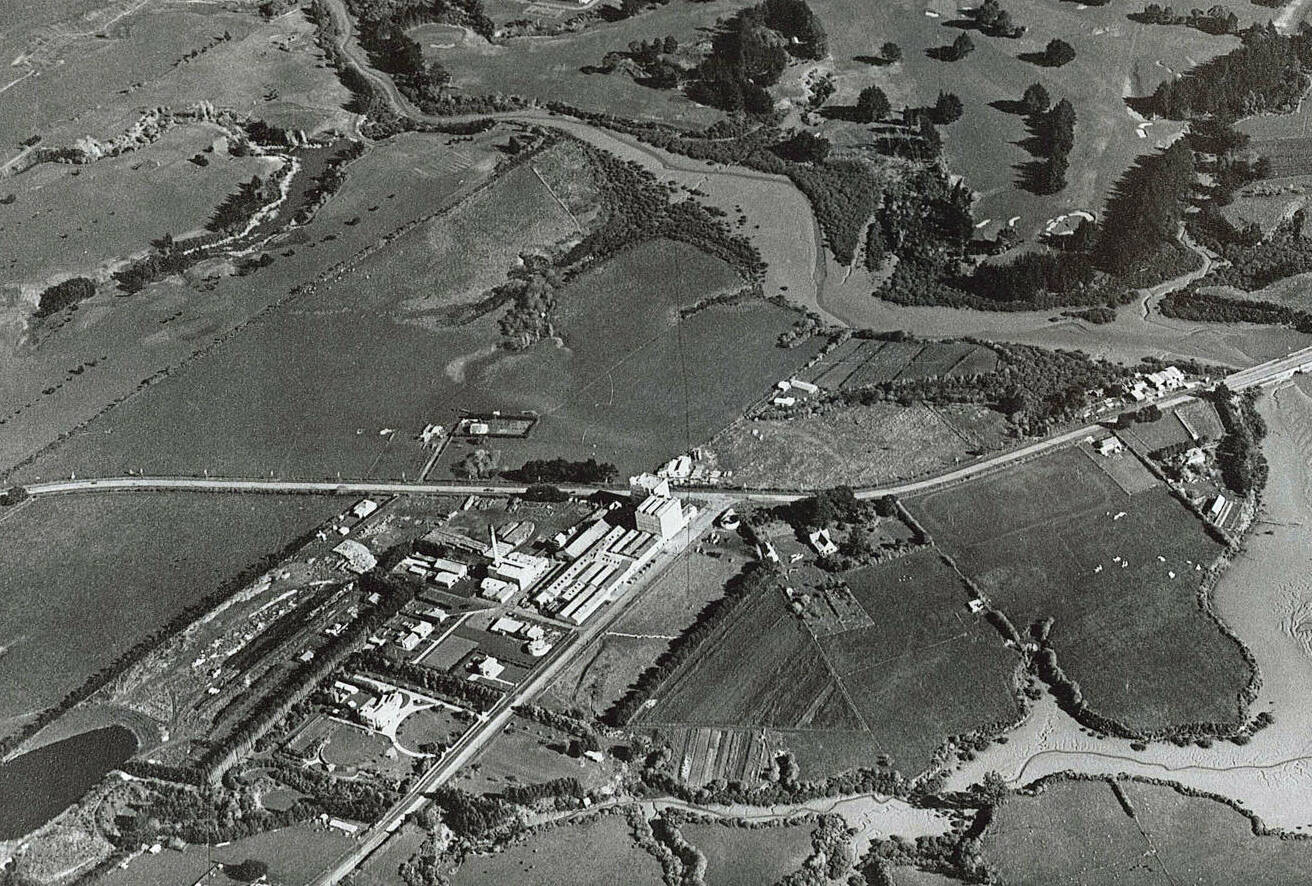
Aerial view of rural Ōtara and the Waitemata Brewery in 1949

In 1851, William Goodfellow purchased Otara Farm along the south-eastern shores of the Tāmaki River, where he built a homestead. William and Ann Goodfellow were some of the very first migrants to Auckland, New Zealand in 1840 on the ship the Lady Lilford. The Goodfellows were joined by Reverend Gideon Smales, who settled a 400-acre (1.6 km^{2}) block purchased from the Government in 1856 at East Tāmaki. The wider East Tāmaki area was predominantly farmland where crops such as wheat were grown, and in the late 19th century the area began converting into dairy farms.

In 1861, Governor George Grey ordered the construction of the Great South Road further south into the Waikato, to improve supply lines through swampy and thickly forested country, prior to the Invasion of the Waikato. On 9 July 1863, due to fears of the Māori King Movement, Governor Grey proclaimed that all Māori living in the South Auckland area needed to swear loyalty to the Queen and give up their weapons. Most people refused due to strong links to Tainui, leaving for the south. During this time, the Te Ākitai Waiohua rangatira Īhaka Takaanini was arrested and died on Rakino Island. After the war, the Crown confiscated 1.2 million acres of Māori land around the Waikato, including Waiohua land in South Auckland, and Ngāi Tai land in East Auckland, despite Ngāi Tai being considered "friendly" people by the Crown and not asked to leave the region.

In 1910, the Goodfellow family sold their farm to the Dilworth Trust, who established the Dilworth Ulster Institute School of Agriculture in 1915. Few people attended the agricultural college, which closed in 1918. In 1919, the Dilworth Trust subdivided the property, and in 1950 sold much of the land to the Ministry of Works, who established the Otara Fertiliser Research Station at the site of the former school. In 1929, the Waitemata Brewery was constructed on the corner of Bairds Road and Great South Road, later becoming DB Breweries.

=== State housing development ===
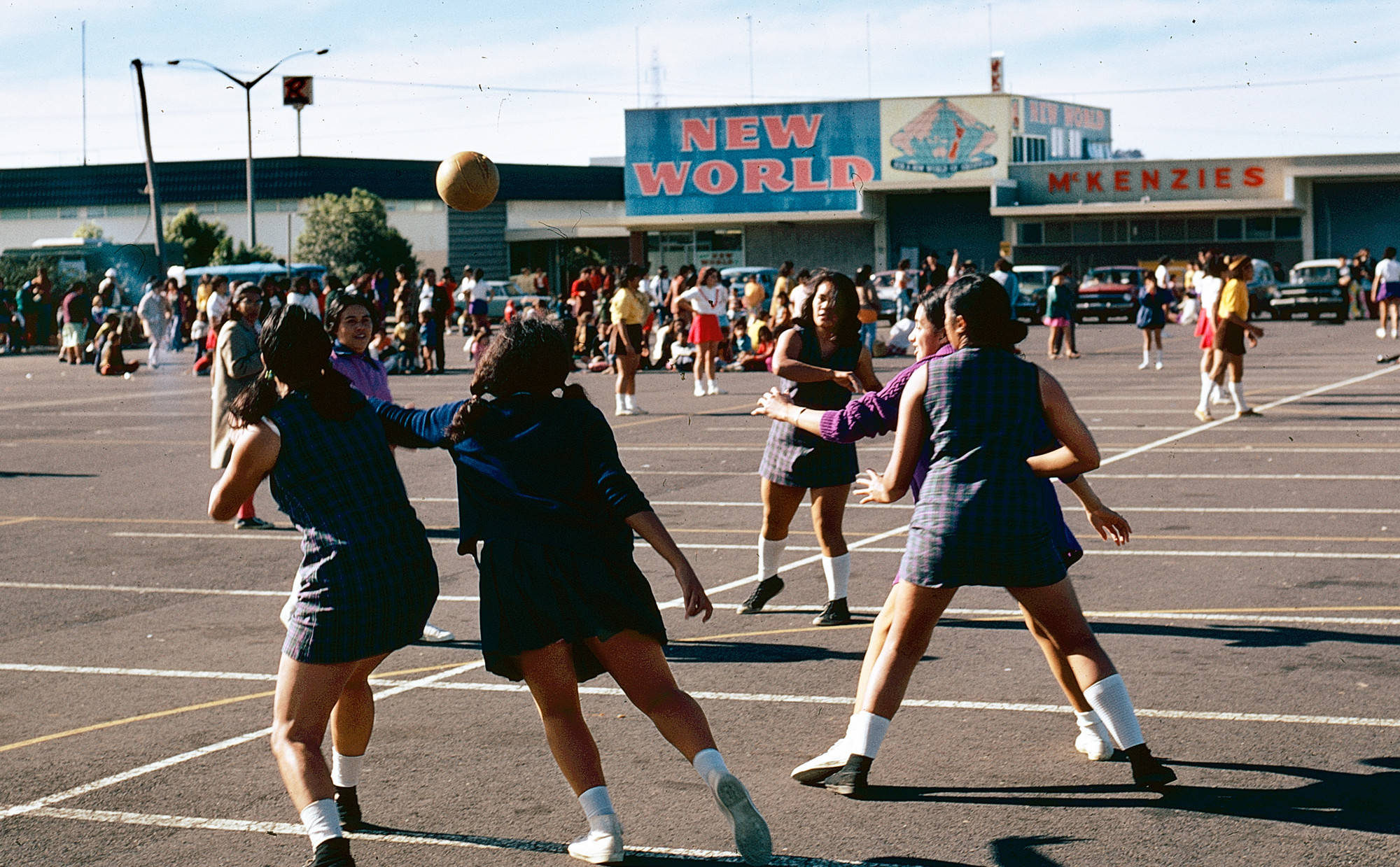
Girls playing netball at the Ōtara Town Centre carpark in 1973

The development of the Auckland Southern Motorway in the mid-1950s led to an explosion in the population of Papatoetoe and Manurewa to the south. To counter overcrowding in the central suburbs, the New Zealand Government undertook large scale state housing developments, creating planned suburbs. Ōtara was chosen as a site for a state housing project due to its proximity to the motorway and the industrial areas of Ōtāhuhu and Penrose, and it was the second large-scale state housing development in Auckland aimed at low-income families, centred around a retail and community centre, following Glen Innes. In August 1958, a Memorandum of Agreement was signed between the Ministry of Works and the Manukau County Council to develop Ōtara, and within 10 years over 3,000 houses had been built.

In June 1958, Otahuhu Foodtown, the first supermarket in New Zealand, was opened by Tom Ah Chee in the future site of Ōtara, who pooled his resources with two other Auckland produce shop owners, Norman Kent and John Brown. The Ōtara Town Centre was officially opened in 1966.

In 1968, the Otahuhu Power Station was opened in Ōtara, which at the time was the largest gas turbine in Australasia, and operated until 2016. In 1970, the Otara Fertiliser Research Station was redeveloped into Manukau Institute of Technology's Ōtara campus, and in 1972 the Ngāti Ōtara Marae was officially opened. In 1987, the Ōtara Town Centre was redeveloped, with the sculpture Fish Canopy by architect Rewi Thompson. Inspired by Pasifika fale and constructed in the shape of a fish.

== Demographics ==
Ōtara covers 6.80 km^{2} (2.63 sq mi) and had an estimated population of 23,510 as of June 2025, with a population density of 3,457 people per km^{2}.

Historical population
Year	Pop.	±% p.a.
2006	22,023	—
2013	20,739	−0.85%
2018	22,872	+1.98%
2023	21,711	−1.04%

Ōtara had a population of 21,711 in the 2023 New Zealand census, a decrease of 1,161 people (−5.1%) since the 2018 census, and an increase of 972 people (4.7%) since the 2013 census. There were 10,674 males, 10,977 females and 60 people of other genders in 4,659 dwellings. 1.8% of people identified as LGBTIQ+. The median age was 27.6 years (compared with 38.1 years nationally). There were 5,895 people (27.2%) aged under 15 years, 5,868 (27.0%) aged 15 to 29, 8,283 (38.2%) aged 30 to 64, and 1,668 (7.7%) aged 65 or older.

People could identify as more than one ethnicity. The results were 10.2% European (Pākehā); 21.8% Māori; 78.4% Pasifika; 7.4% Asian; 0.4% Middle Eastern, Latin American and African New Zealanders (MELAA); and 0.3% other, which includes people giving their ethnicity as "New Zealander". English was spoken by 89.7%, Māori language by 5.7%, Samoan by 27.4%, and other languages by 17.0%. No language could be spoken by 2.7% (e.g. too young to talk). New Zealand Sign Language was known by 0.5%. The percentage of people born overseas was 35.1, compared with 28.8% nationally.

Religious affiliations were 65.1% Christian, 1.1% Hindu, 1.1% Islam, 2.3% Māori religious beliefs, 0.5% Buddhist, 0.1% New Age, and 0.7% other religions. People who answered that they had no religion were 21.4%, and 8.1% of people did not answer the census question.

Of those at least 15 years old, 1,023 (6.5%) people had a bachelor's or higher degree, 7,776 (49.2%) had a post-high school certificate or diploma, and 7,020 (44.4%) people exclusively held high school qualifications. The median income was $29,200, compared with $41,500 nationally. 348 people (2.2%) earned over $100,000 compared to 12.1% nationally. The employment status of those at least 15 was that 6,984 (44.2%) people were employed full-time, 1,362 (8.6%) were part-time, and 1,101 (7.0%) were unemployed.

Individual statistical areas
Name	Area (km^{2})	Population	Density (per km^{2})	Dwellings	Median age	Median income
Ōtara West	1.55	3,120	2,013	660	26.5 years	$29,000
Ōtara Central	1.52	2,565	1,688	630	29.3 years	$27,100
Ōtara East	0.87	3,756	4,317	786	26.9 years	$30,700
Ōtara South West	0.46	1,887	4,102	426	30.2 years	$29,600
Ōtara South	0.61	2,886	4,731	597	27.2 years	$28,600
Ferguson	0.72	3,063	4,254	618	26.4 years	$28,000
Rongomai West	0.49	2,328	4,751	462	27.0 years	$29,500
Rongomai East	0.58	2,106	3,631	483	28.3 years	$32,900
New Zealand					38.1 years	$41,500

== Notable places ==
- The DSIR buildings are located on Otara Road. The buildings were constructed in 1916 to the design of Richard Abbott. The buildings were purchased by the DSIR in 1950.

== Notable people ==
- Len Brown, first Auckland "Super City" Mayor and former Manukau City Mayor prior to the "Super City" merge
- Pauly Fuemana of OMC, recording artist who achieved global success with the hit, "How Bizarre"
- Tau Henare, 38th Minister for Māori Affairs and politician with the National Party
- Sid Diamond and Deach, hip-hop artists and members of Smashproof
- "The Beast" Manu Vatuvei, rugby league player for the Vodafone Warriors and the Kiwis
- Tina Cross, entertainer
- Rawiri Paratene, actor
- Beulah Koale, actor
- "The Tongan Goddess" Nailini Helu, the world's first Tongan female professional boxer
- Efeso Collins, politician who served on Auckland Council with the New Zealand Labour Party and as a Member of Parliament as a member of the Green Party of Aotearoa New Zealand.

== Culture ==
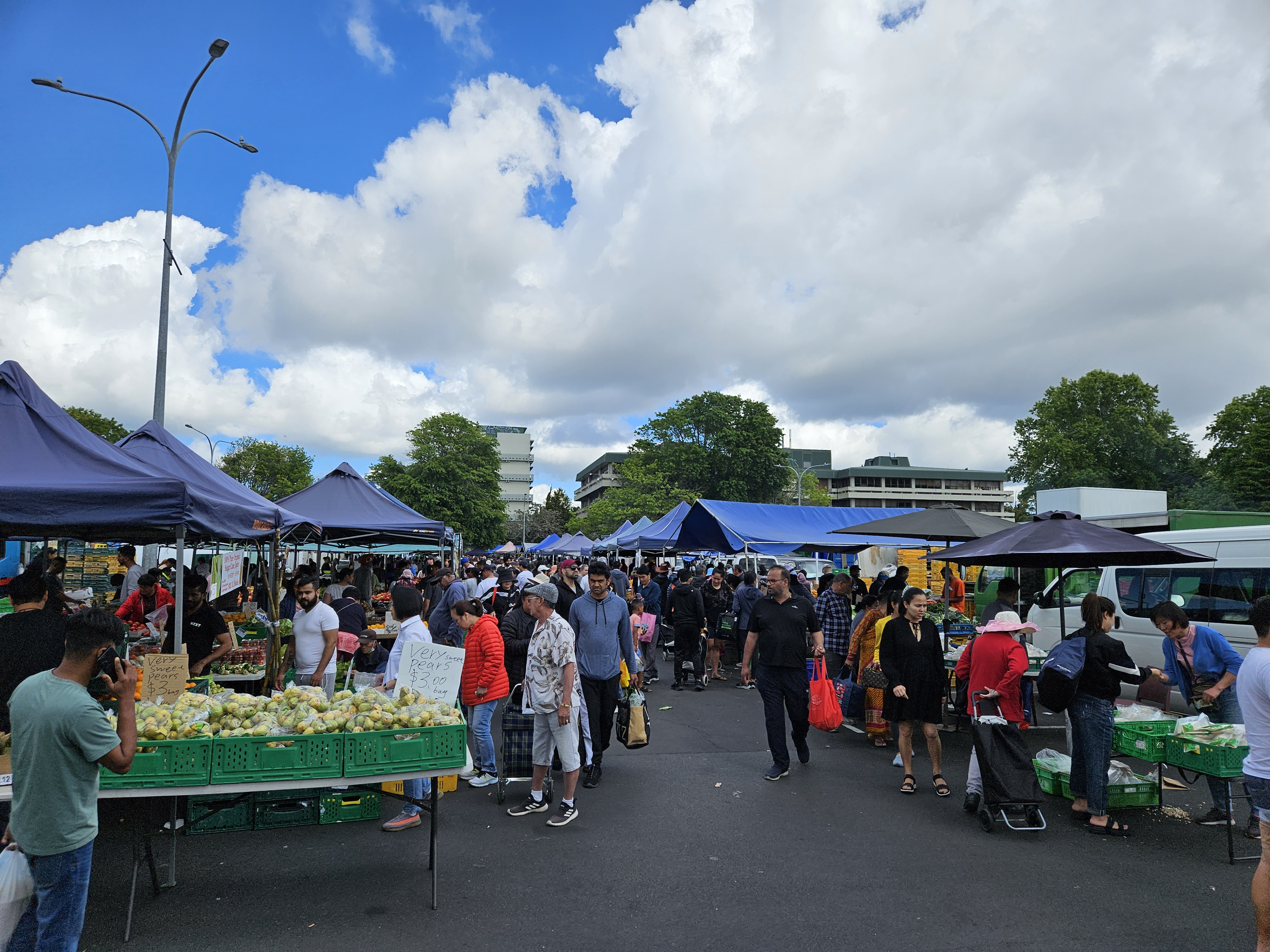
Ōtara Markets

Ōtara achieved some international recognition due to the success of the song "How Bizarre", by Ōtara-based musical group OMC. The group's name stands for "Ōtara Millionaires' Club", an ironic reference to Ōtara being one of the least wealthy areas of Auckland at the time the group formed.

Ōtara is also known for its Saturday morning 'flea market' held in the Ōtara shopping centre car park next to the South Campus of Manukau Institute of Technology. The Ōtara Markets first started in the late 1970s, and are the largest street market in New Zealand.

Ōtara long had some of the highest crime rates of the country, but a major action against the Tribesmen and Killer Beez gangs in 2008 along with 2010s increases in police force numbers in the area, combined with a community policing approach, have been credited with both reducing crime and establishing less hostile attitudes between the locals and the police.

== Education ==
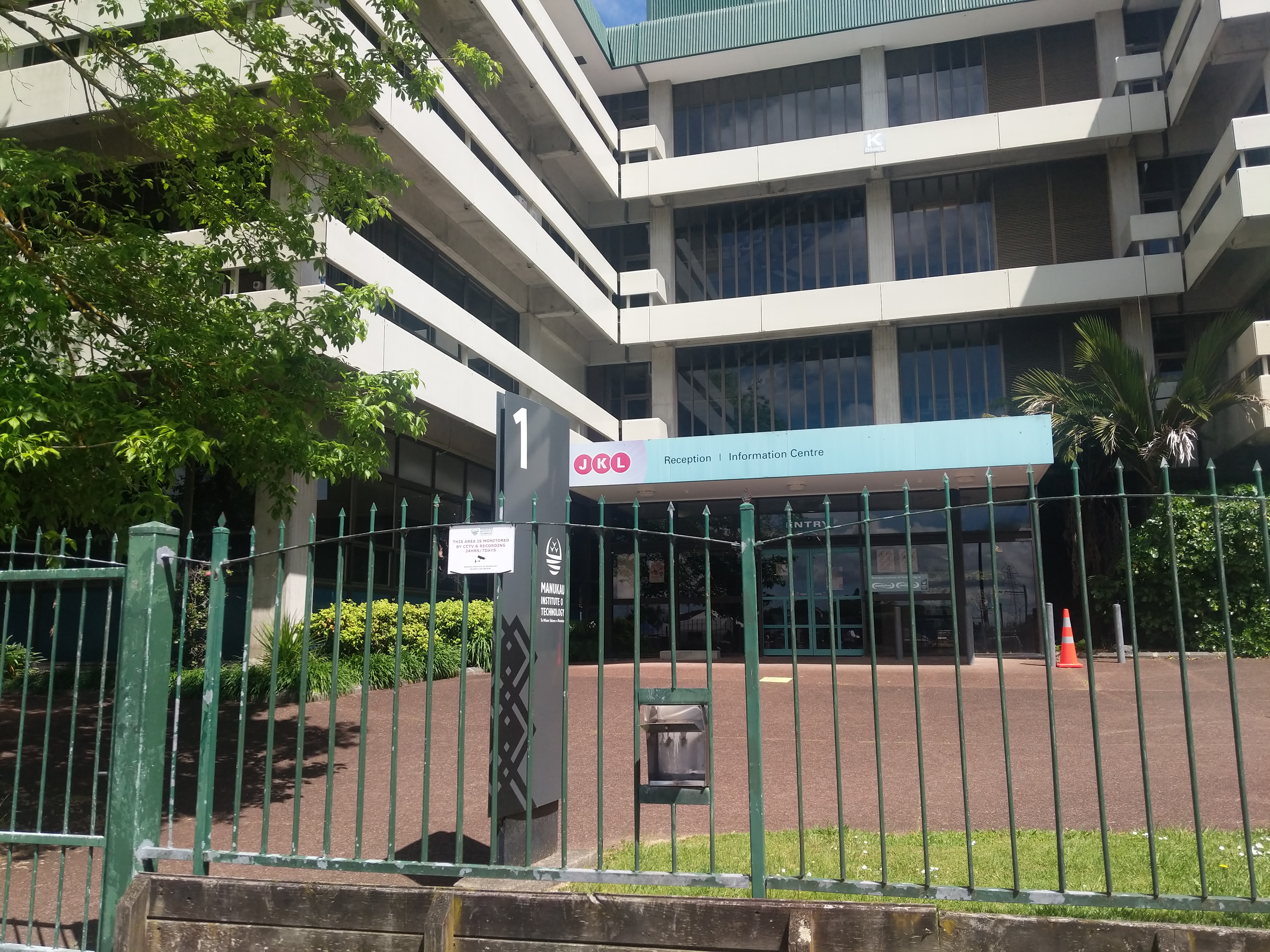
Manukau Institute of Technology Ōtara campus

Sir Edmund Hillary Collegiate consists of three schools on a single campus. The Junior School catering for years 1–6 has a roll of 355; the Middle School, years 7 and 8, has 317 students; and the Senior School catering for Years 9–13 has 664. Hillary College, Bairds Intermediate and Clydemore Primary School are the three schools that now form Sir Edmund Hillary Collegiate.

Tangaroa College is a secondary school (years 9–13) with a roll of 1,088. The Tangaroa College Teen Parent Unit shares its campus.

Ferguson Intermediate is an intermediate school (years 7–8) with a roll of 381.

Bairds Mainfreight Primary School, Dawson School, East Tāmaki School, Flat Bush School, Mayfield School, Rongomai School, Wymondley Road School and Yendarra School are contributing primary schools (years 1–6) with rolls of 331, 284, 171, 401, 298, 151, 142 and 224 students, respectively.

Te Kura Kaupapa Māori o Otara is a Māori language full primary school (years 1–8) with a roll of 95.

St John the Evangelist Catholic School is a state-integrated full primary school (years 1–8) with a roll of 193.

All these schools are coeducational. Rolls are as of July 2026.

Ōtara is also home to Manukau Institute of Technology's two main campuses.

== Bibliography ==
- Clark, Jennifer A. (2002). East Tamaki: Including the Adjoining Areas of Flat Bush and Otara. Papatoetoe Historical Society. ISBN 0-473-09058-9. OCLC 156099387. Wikidata Q120020174.
- La Roche, Alan (2011). Grey's Folly: A History of Howick, Pakuranga, Bucklands-Eastern Beaches, East Tamaki, Whitford, Beachlands and Maraetai. Auckland: Tui Vale Productions. ISBN 978-0-473-18547-3. OCLC 1135039710. Wikidata Q118286377.
- Mackintosh, Lucy (2021). Shifting Grounds: Deep Histories of Tāmaki Makaurau Auckland. Bridget Williams Books. doi:10.7810/9781988587332. ISBN 978-1-988587-33-2.
- Walker, Ranginui (2004). Ka Whawhai Tonu Matou - Struggle Without End (2nd ed.). Auckland, New Zealand: Penguin Books. ISBN 9780143019459.
