= Manukau Institute of Technology =

Institute of technology in Auckland

Coordinates: 36.960540°S 174.871097°E

Manukau Institute of Technology (MIT)
- Te Whare Takiura o Manukau
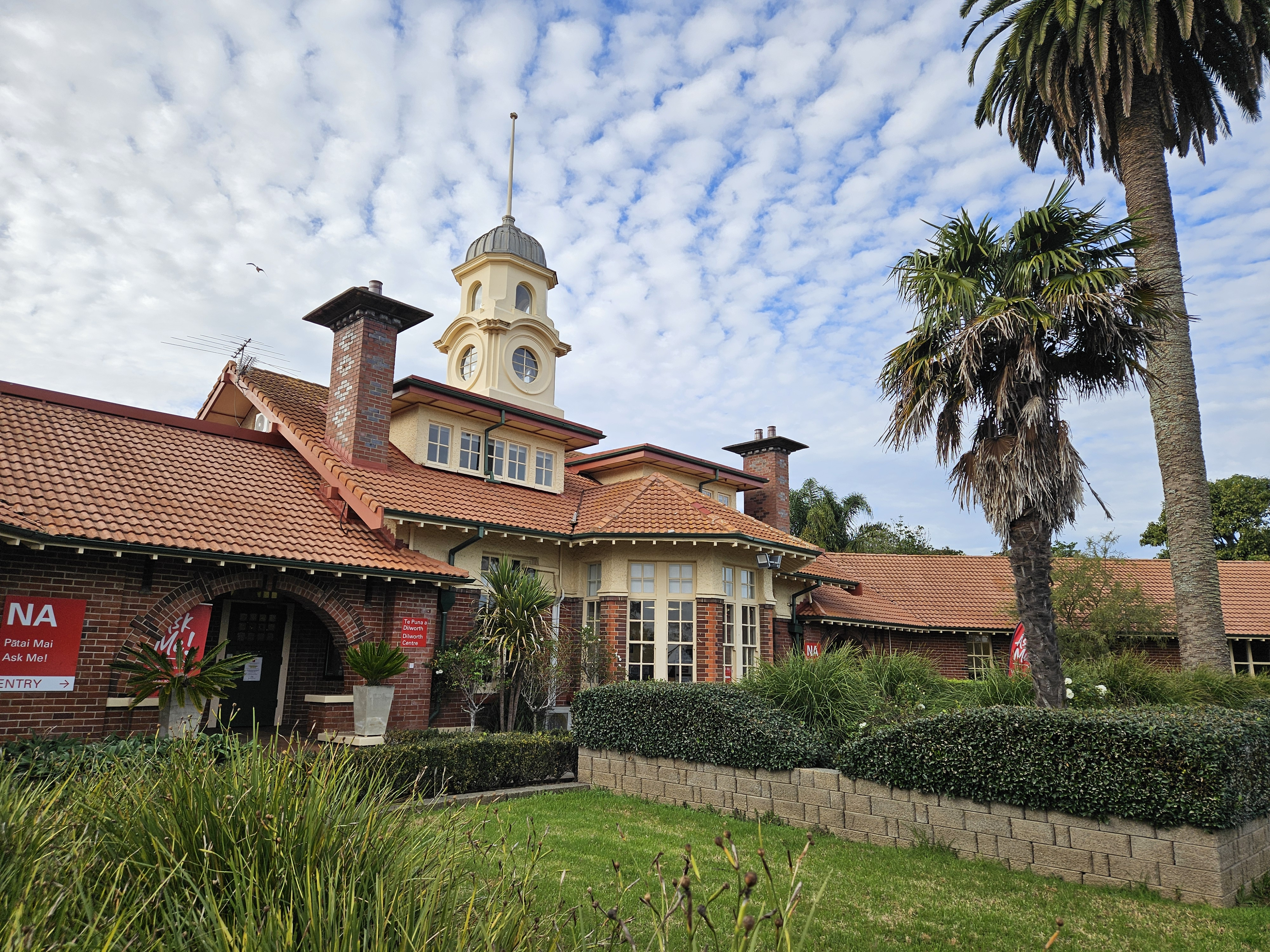
- MIT Ōtara
- Established: 1970; 56 years ago
- Students: over 14,000 students
- Location: Auckland, New Zealand
- Website: www.manukau.ac.nz

Established in 1970, Manukau Institute of Technology (MIT) (Māori: Te Whare Takiura o Manukau) is a Category One Institute of technology in Auckland, New Zealand. MIT is one of the largest providers of technical, vocational and professional education in New Zealand, and has over 14,000 enrolled students.

== History ==
On 1 April 2020, Manukau Institute of Technology was subsumed into the New Zealand Institute of Skills & Technology, alongside the 15 other Institutes of Technology and Polytechnics (ITPs).

In mid-July 2025, the Vocational Education Minister Penny Simmonds announced that the Government would merge MIT with the Unitec Institute of Technology into a new stand-alone entity by 1 January 2025.

On 1 January 2026, the combined Unitec/MIT polytechnic entity formally exited Te Pukenga and became an independent entity. In mid-February 2026, the Government allocated NZ$52 million to the combined United/MIT polytechnic to assist with the transition.

== Campuses ==
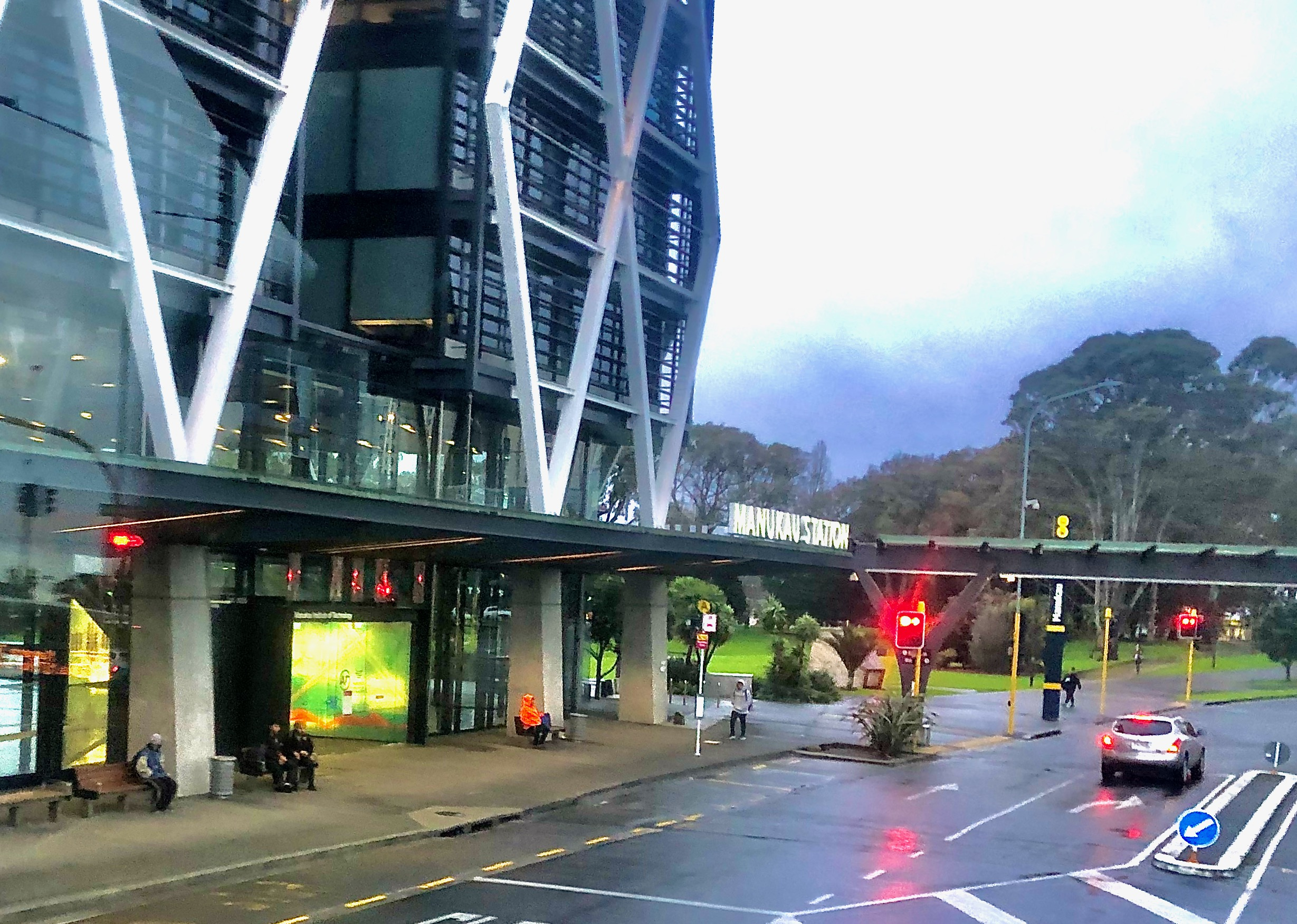
MIT Manukau and the Manukau railway station

Campuses across Auckland:

- MIT Ōtara – (Ōtara) – the main campus
- MIT Manukau (Manukau)
- MIT Tech Park (Manukau)
- MIT City Campus – (Auckland CBD) – New Zealand Maritime School
- MIT Kolmar – (Papatoetoe)

== Notable people ==
- Terryann Clark
- Tupou Manapori
- Louise Rummel
