= Bairds Mainfreight Primary School =

Location
- Edward Ave, Ōtara, Manukau City; 36.959271°S 174.867625°E

Information
- Type: State: Not integrated co-educational (year 0-6)
- Motto: We develop citizens who will build a world of the future secure in the knowledge that, "Anything is Possible"
- Established: 1961
- Ministry of Education Institution no.: 1218
- Principal: Mr Alan Lyth
- Enrolment: 331 (July 2026)
- Socio-economic decile: 1A
- Website: bmps.school.nz

Bairds Mainfreight Primary School is a contributing primary school (years 0–6) in Ōtara, a suburb of Auckland Council, Auckland Region, New Zealand.

The trucking and logistics firm Mainfreight Limited has sponsored the school since 1993. The school benefits from this relationship due to the support Mainfreight gives to it in the area of Information and Communication Technologies, and Alan Duff's Duffy Books in Homes programme. Mainfreight's philosophy of "Anything is Possible" is one that fits with the educational philosophy of the school. In 1997 the school renamed itself from Bairds Primary School to its current name.
