= Motutapu Island =

Island in the Hauraki Gulf of New Zealand

Native name: Motutapu (Māori)
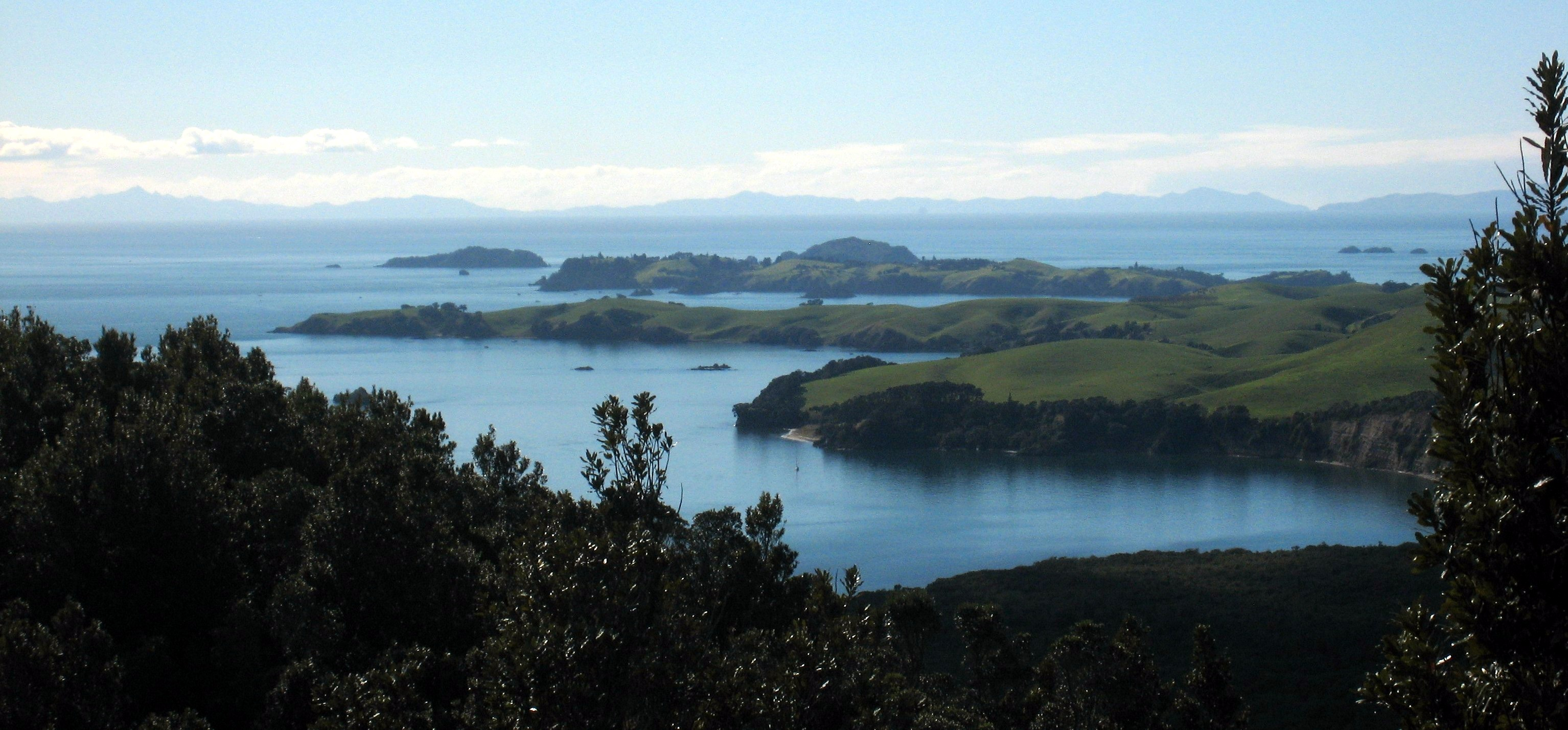
- The nearest two headlands in this view from Rangitoto are part of Motutapu

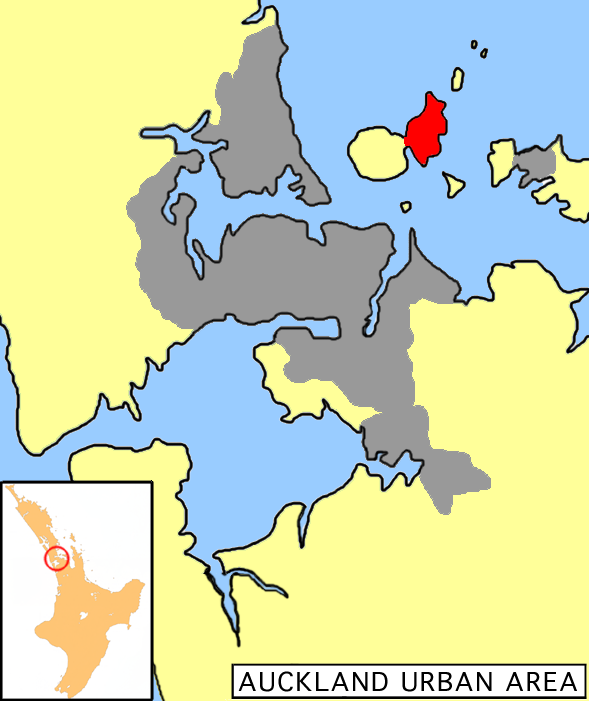
- Location of Motutapu island (marked in red)

Geography
- Location: Hauraki Gulf
- Coordinates: 36°45′S 174°55′E
- Area: 15.1 km^{2} (5.8 sq mi)

Administration
- New Zealand

Demographics
- Population: 6

Motutapu Island is a 1,510 ha (3,700-acre) island in the Hauraki Gulf to the northeast of the city of Auckland, New Zealand. The island is part of the Hauraki Gulf Maritime Park. The island can be accessed via regular ferry services departing from Auckland City.

== Etymology ==
Motutapu's full name in Māori, rarely used, is Te Motutapu a Taikehu, 'The sacred island of Taikehu', a tohunga (tribal priest) of the Tainui tribe. Motutapu, meaning 'sacred' or 'sanctuary' island, is a term used for various islands in a number of Polynesian cultures.

== Geography ==
Approximately 18,000 years ago during the Last Glacial Maximum when sea levels were over 100 metres lower than present day levels, Motutapu Island was landlocked to the North Island, surrounded by a vast coastal plain where the Hauraki Gulf exists today. Sea levels began to rise 7,000 years ago, after which Motutapu became an island separated from the rest of New Zealand.

The island is now linked by an artificial causeway to the much younger volcanic island cone of Rangitoto. Prior to the emergence of the volcano, the island had been extensively occupied by Māori for over 100 years. The eruption, approximately 700 years ago, destroyed their settlements, but there is circumstantial evidence that some of the residents may have escaped the destruction, presumably by waka (canoe). Of the many archaeological sites recorded, one, the Sunde Site (Puharakeke), shows human and dog footprints preserved in solidified ash. These were protected from erosion by a layer of ash from the next eruption.

Today the island lacks the forest cover of neighbouring Rangitoto Island and most areas are limited to grass and wet meadows. There are few large trees on the island but a reforestation project has been carried out by the Motutapu Restoration Trust. The project has brought back many indigenous flora to various sections of the island.

In March 2013, two shallow earthquakes situated beneath Motutapu Island measuring 3.1 and 3.9 shook the Auckland area. Fears they could be a sign of a looming eruption at nearby Rangitoto Island were allayed by geologists, who said they were caused by fault lines, not volcanic activity.

== History ==
Motutapu was one of the earliest places inhabited both by Polynesians, and later by Europeans in the Auckland region. The earliest evidence for occupation of Motutapu dates to before the eruption of Rangitoto, circa 1400 AD. (Note: The dating of the Rangitoto eruption has been subject to review since it was originally published. Davidson’s review of the dates from the Sunde site in 1974 and Law’s in 1975 suggested a late 14th century date on the basis of two charcoal dates NZ1898 and NZ1899. However since that time the problems with in-built age in wood samples have become apparent. Nichol reviewed the dates in 1992, and included evidence from thermoluminescence (AD 1400–20) and paleomagnetic (1420) dating. These together with NZ1167 and NZ6954 which suggested AD 1400 was the earliest possible date, led him to conclude a date of c. AD 1400. This was also supported by McFadgen (1996), and the additional average dates from six obsidian hydration samples published in 2000 by Lowe et al.) The eruption smothered Motutapu in ash and caused widespread deforestation, but also produced friable soils suitable for gardening. Archaeological deposits bracketing the ash suggest the eruption prompted a shift from broad-spectrum hunting of forest birds to intensive marine exploitation and horticulture. Numerous kumara pits were later found by archeologists. Archaeological surveys of the island undertaken since the 1960s have shown that the island was used as an area to manufacture adze (toki) between AD1400 and AD1500, using the greywacke found on the island.

Following the eruption Motutapu is reported to have been visited by both the Arawa and Tainui canoes and was subsequently settled by the Tainui ancestors of the Ngāi Tai ki Tāmaki. The island's traditional name, Te Motu Tapu a Taikehu ("The Sacred island of Taikehu"), is a reference to a tohunga of the Tainui canoe. Ngāi Tai maintained rights of occupation from that time until its eventual sale with only minor incursions from other groups. The Ngāti Huarere of Arawa descent claimed bird snaring rights over the kākā (native parrot) by right of conquest, and from the 18th century reciprocal fishing rights were negotiated with Ngāti Pāoa on Waiheke Island. In the 1820s many of the islands in the Hauraki Gulf, including Motutapu, were evacuated in response to the threat of Hongi Hika and the Ngāpuhi armed with muskets. Many of the Hauraki tribes retreated south, and the Ngāi Tai are said to have taken refuge at Maungatautari. Occasional ventures were made back to former territories in the gulf, sometimes not without consequence, as with when a local fishing party was attacked at Motutapu by Ngāpuhi with several casualties. From 1836 many of the evacuated territories were resettled, and the Ngāi Tai remained on Motutapu until the northern part of the island was sold to Tom Maxwell in 1840. Since the 1840s, the island has been worked as a pastoral farm, with farming settlements centred around Emu Bay and Home Bay.

Maxwell had lived at Maraetai with the Ngāi Tai and was married to Ngeungeu, the daughter of the principal chief, Tara Te Irirangi. From 1840 to 1845 the northern end was leased out to James Moncur. The southern end was purchased by Williamson and Crummer in 1845, but subsequently granted to politician Robert Graham in 1857, with the island increasingly becoming a trip destination – Home Bay Wharf hosted such attractions as whale boat racing, greased pig chasing and hunting. The Reid brothers purchased the island in 1869–70 and retained ownership until 1943. A series of homesteads and outbuildings have been built at Home Bay, the first between 1840 and 1857, and the present Reid Homestead was built 1901–03. A homestead was built at Emu Bay c. 1869–70, occupied by James Reid and demolished in 1976.

Work began on the Motutapu counter-bombardment battery in 1936. In May 1936 roads to battery had been formed, and the battery and observation post completed by June 1937, guns mounted by end of August 1938, and a temporary camp established at Administration Bay in 1937. War broke out in September 1939 and the military population on the island went from 10 to 200, requiring the construction of additional buildings at Administration Bay and at the observation posts. Plotting rooms were constructed in 1941–42, and searchlights installed at Billy Goat point. The US Navy intended to use Auckland as a staging point into the Pacific and this led to the construction of deepwater wharfing facilities, and the construction of 50 ammunition magazines between 1942 and 1943. The war ended in 1945, and within five years the entire complex had been abandoned.

The Department of Conservation began a long-term restoration programme on the island in 1992, aiming to revegetate the island with native species by the 2040s.

== Landscape ==
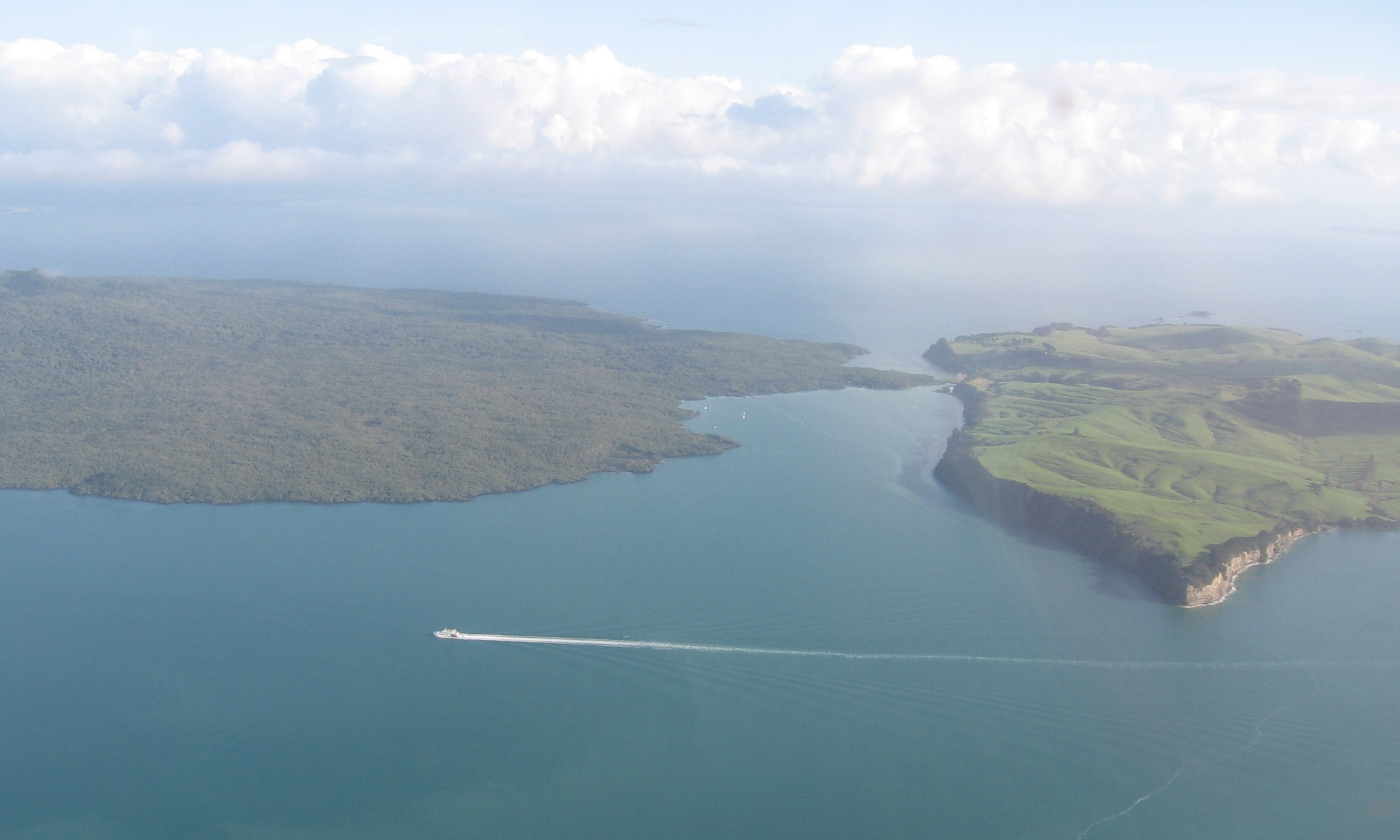
View from the south of Rangitoto Island and Motutapu Island

Geologically, Motutapu comprises Waipapa series greywackes, cherts and argillites, overlaid with Waitemata tertiary sediments, and blanketed in Rangitoto ash. The cultural landscape of archaeological sites includes pre-Rangitoto eruption archaic campsites and adze making sites, 13 pā, numerous open settlements, midden deposits, storage pits, and agricultural areas. There are 372 recorded sites and it is likely that many more subsurface deposits remain unrecorded. Some of the sites will have been damaged or destroyed by farming and military activity.

Sizes of recorded sites vary as might be expected over time with fluctuations in demographics and blurring boundaries of a mobile population. Settlement sites are spread across the whole island, with some apparent clustering on the western leeward side of the island around the mountain and causeway stream catchments, and early archaic settlements at open stream mouths and adjacent spurs. Davidson notes that a clustering around stream mouths and high number of distinct sites might be suggestive of a rotation garden system. Pā sites are present on most of the easily defensible coastal headlands, although the relatively small amount of habitable land enclosed within defensive earthworks compared to area of occupied open settlements leads Davidson to conclude some of the open settlements may have been palisaded without earthwork defences, and that settlement on Motutapu was most likely a “peace-time horticultural based occupation, with periodic episodes of stress leading to fort construction and use”.

Stone sources exploited for tool manufacture were largely the local greywacke found on Motutapu and nearby Motuihe, but included obsidians from Great Barrier and Northland, as well as Nelson argillites and basalts from Tahanga. Other locally sourced rock used in tool production included jaspers for hammerstones and sandstone grinders.

There are three main areas associated with the 19th-century farming, and these include associated remnant plantings. Home Bay retains homestead, plantings, seawall, and graves. Emu Bay has the foundations of four separate groups of buildings, remnant plantings and isolated Norfolk pines on high points of the island. No archaeological remains have yet been located at Station Bay where the remaining farm settlement is known to have been located.

The military structures on Motutapu comprise a largely intact World War II landscape including: the main 6-inch gun emplacement with three gun pits, underground magazines, shelters and stores; the battery observation post, engine and radar rooms; the Emu observation post and engine room for the anti-submarine defences; the ground-level plotting complex with miniature range, plotting and generator rooms; the underground plotting complex with command exchange, radio, plotting generator, battery and fuel rooms, as well as access tunnels and corridors; the search light emplacements and directing station; personnel camps at Administration Bay and the battery; the US Navy magazines north of the causeway and store at Home Bay, and numerous pillboxes to protect the battery from a commando assault. The landscape also includes a number of roads, wharves and quarries.

== Ecological restoration ==
The natural vegetation of the island was almost totally gone by the middle of the 19th century, due to the volcanic eruption and subsequent settlement activities and pests introductions by both Māori and Europeans.

=== Pest eradication and translocation of native species ===
Possums and wallabies were eradicated from the island in the early 1990s. Following three aerial drops of brodifacoum poison baits on Motutapu and Rangitoto in winter 2009, as of January 2010, rodents, rabbits and stoats appeared to have been successfully eradicated. Most cats had been removed, though a few may remain, and hedgehogs were still plentiful. In August 2011 both Rangitoto and Motutapu were declared pest free. Since then a number of native New Zealand species have been translocated to Motutapu including takahē, saddleback and North Island brown kiwi. The work is overseen by the Motutapu Restoration Trust, and is to restore both the natural and the cultural heritage of the island, from restoration of the historic Reid homestead to replanting forests and restoring wetlands.

== See also ==
- List of islands of New Zealand

== Additional sources ==
- Davidson, J.M. 1978a. The Prehistory of Motutapu Island, New Zealand: Five Centuries of Polynesian Occupation in a Changing Landscape, JOURNAL OF THE POLYNESIAN SOCIETY, 87(4):327–337.
- Davidson, Janet Marjorie (1978). "Auckland Prehistory: A Review". Records of the Auckland Institute and Museum. 15: 1–14. JSTOR 42906259. OCLC 270925589. Wikidata Q58677062.
- Davidson, J.M. 1981. The Polynesian Foundation, In Oliver, W.H. and B.R. Williams (Eds) THE OXFORD HISTORY OF NEW ZEALAND, pp. 3–27.
- Davidson, J.M. 1982. ‘Auckland’ in Prickett, N. (ed) The First Thousand Years Regional Perspectives in New Zealand Archaeology. New Zealand Archaeological Association Monograph No.13. Dunmore Press, Palmerston North pp. 28–48
- Coster, J. SPRING-RICE, W. 1984. History, Archaeology and Site Management on Motutapu and Rangitoto. UNPUBLISHED REPORT, DEPARTMENT OF LANDS AND SURVEY, AUCKLAND. Department of Lands and Survey, Auckland.
- Dave Pearson Architects 1997 The Military Installations of Motutapu Island: A Conservation Plan, Report prepared for the Motutapu Island Restoration Trust. Dave Pearson Architects Limited Auckland.
