= Ngāi Tai ki Tāmaki =

Māori iwi (tribe) in New Zealand

Ngāi Tai ki Tamaki
- Iwi (tribe) in Māoridom
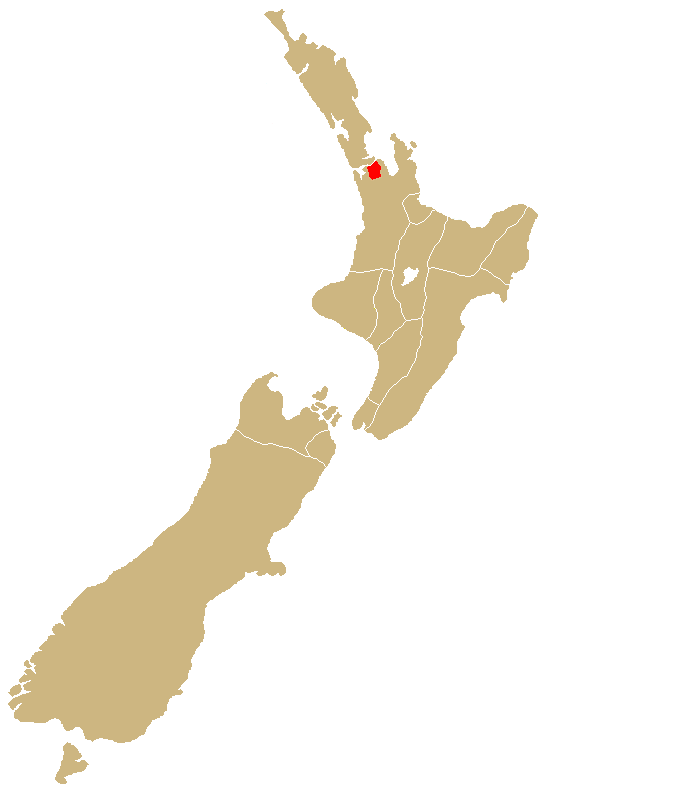

Ngāi Tai ki Tāmaki is a Māori tribe that is based in the area around Clevedon, part of the Auckland region (Tāmaki in the Māori language). It is one of the twelve members of the Hauraki Collective of tribes.

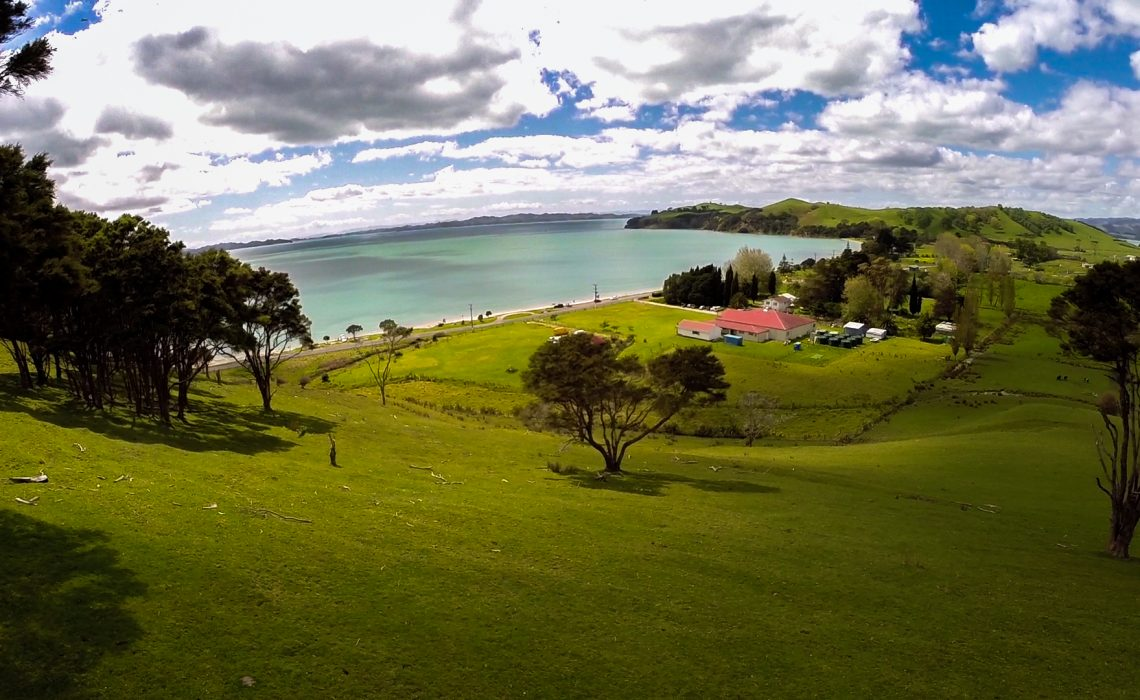
Umupuia Marae

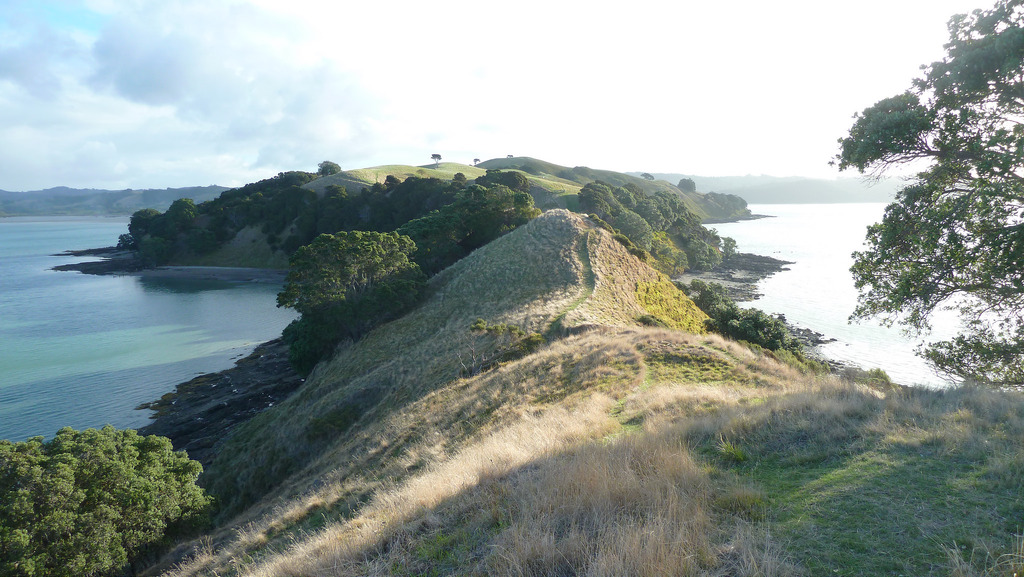
Whakakaiwhara Pā

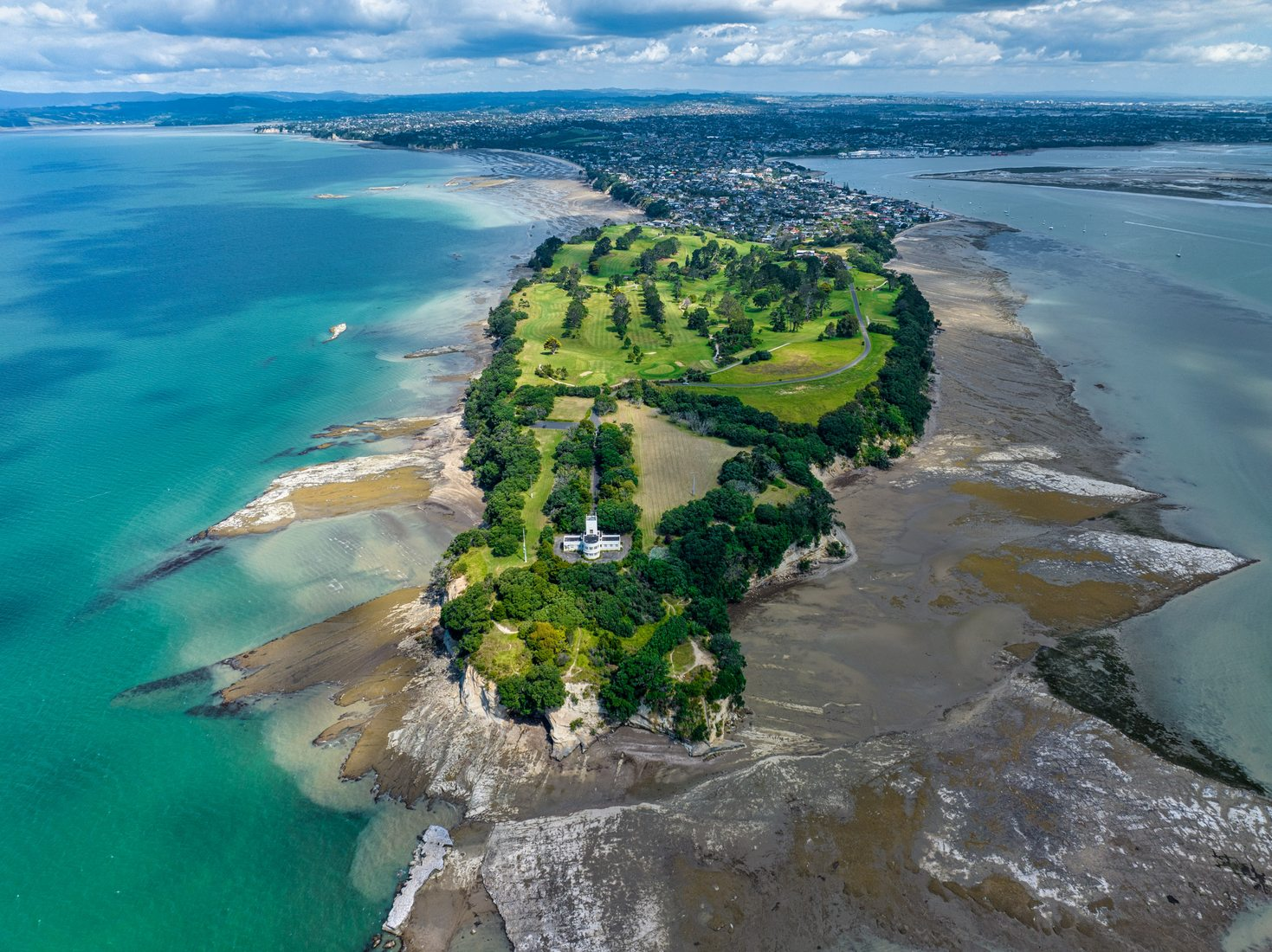
Te Waiarohia/Te Naupata - Te Wai o Taiki

The founding ancestors of Ngāi Tai ki Tāmaki arrived in Aotearoa on the Tainui migration canoe, making several landfalls along the coast where they established connections and intermarried with local iwi. These encounters included unions with descendants of the earlier Te Tini o Toi peoples. Eventually, they came to Waiorohe and Taurere (Taylor’s Hill, Glendowie), where the rangatira Tiki Te Auwhatu (also known as Te Kateanataua) settled and married Hinematapāua, a local woman of Te Tini o Toi descent.

Tainui waka was then dragged across Te Tō Waka, the portage from the Tāmaki River to the Manukau Harbour. Their descendants occupied parts of the Hauraki Gulf, including east Auckland as far inland as Ōtara, and Maungarei, as well as Clevedon, Maraetai and Howick. Te Irirangi Drive, a major highway in Manukau City, is named after one of their rangatira (chiefs), Tara Te Irirangi.

Ngāi Tai has a marae at Umupuia Beach, between Maraetai and Clevedon. They also use the Ngāti Tamaoho marae at Karaka.

In 2015 the Crown settled with Ngāi Tai ki Tāmaki over historic grievances, including both financial and cultural compensation. In 2021, Ngāi Tai ki Tāmaki paid $97 million to the Crown to purchase the land Macleans College sits on in Bucklands Beach. The sale took place on 30 March 2021, in accordance with the 2015 deed of settlement previously signed with the Crown.

In 2018, the iwi won a case in the Supreme Court, allowing them to apply to the Department of Conservation for exclusive rights to run commercial operations on Motutapu and Rangitoto islands. The court decision was based on giving effect to principles within the Treaty of Waitangi and recognition that although the islands are administered by the Department of Conservation, Ngāi Tai ki Tāmaki has traditional ownership (mana whenua). This decision had implications for the Department of Conservation management plans for the conservation estate, including the National Parks, and led to a pause in the review of the management plans for Aoraki / Mount Cook National Park and Westland Tai Poutini National Park.

== See also ==
- List of iwi
