= Pukewairiki =

Volcano in Auckland, New Zealand

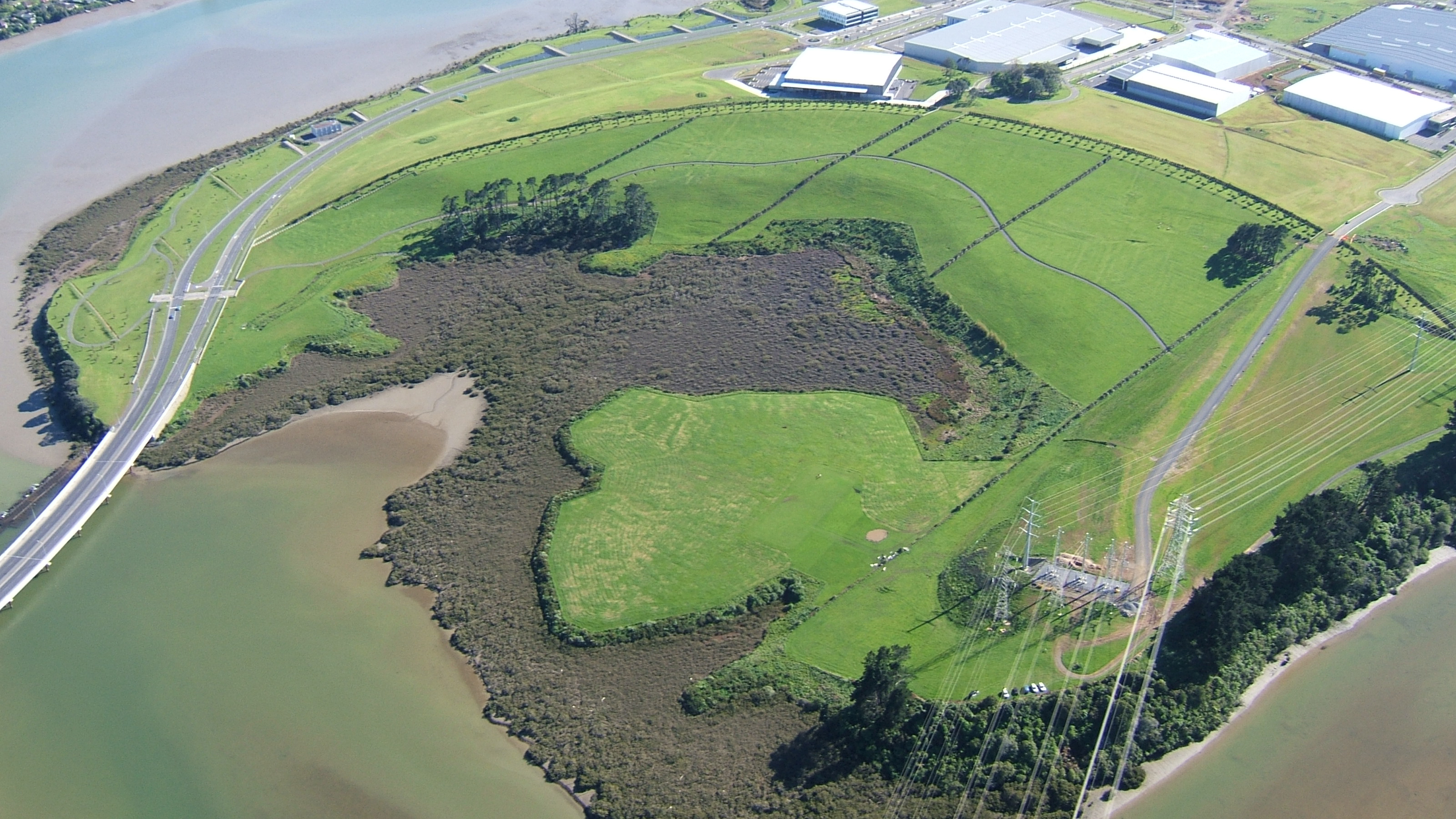
- Aerial view of Pukewairiki in 2009
- Interactive map of Pukewairiki
- Location: Auckland, North Island
- Coordinates: 36.944078°S 174.865887°E
- Type: maar lake
- Primary inflows: Ōtara Creek
- Primary outflows: Tāmaki River
- Surface elevation: 0 m (0 ft)

Pukewairiki located in Highbrook Park is a volcano in the Auckland volcanic field in the North Island of New Zealand.

== Geography ==
Pukewairiki is one of the oldest known volcanoes of the Auckland Volcanic Field, having erupted an estimated 130,000 years ago. It has an explosion crater around 500 m wide, and a tuff ring up to 30 m high, which has been eroded away on the south-western side. The northern side had a terrace eroded into at a time of higher sea-level during the Last Interglacial. In the past it has erroneously been called Pukekiwiriki, which is the name for Red Hill, Papakura.

The crater is located in Highbrook Park, a public park in East Tāmaki, Auckland on the shores of the Ōtara Creek.

== Gallery ==
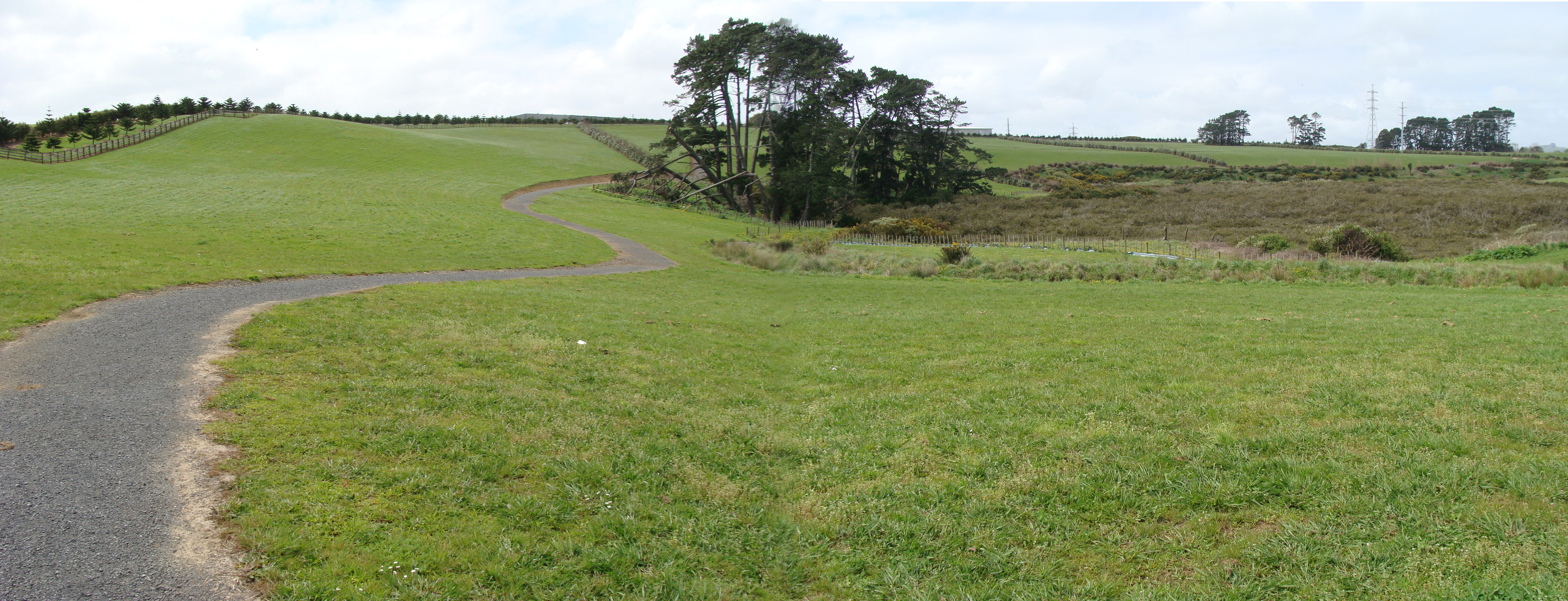
Pukewairiki tuff crater

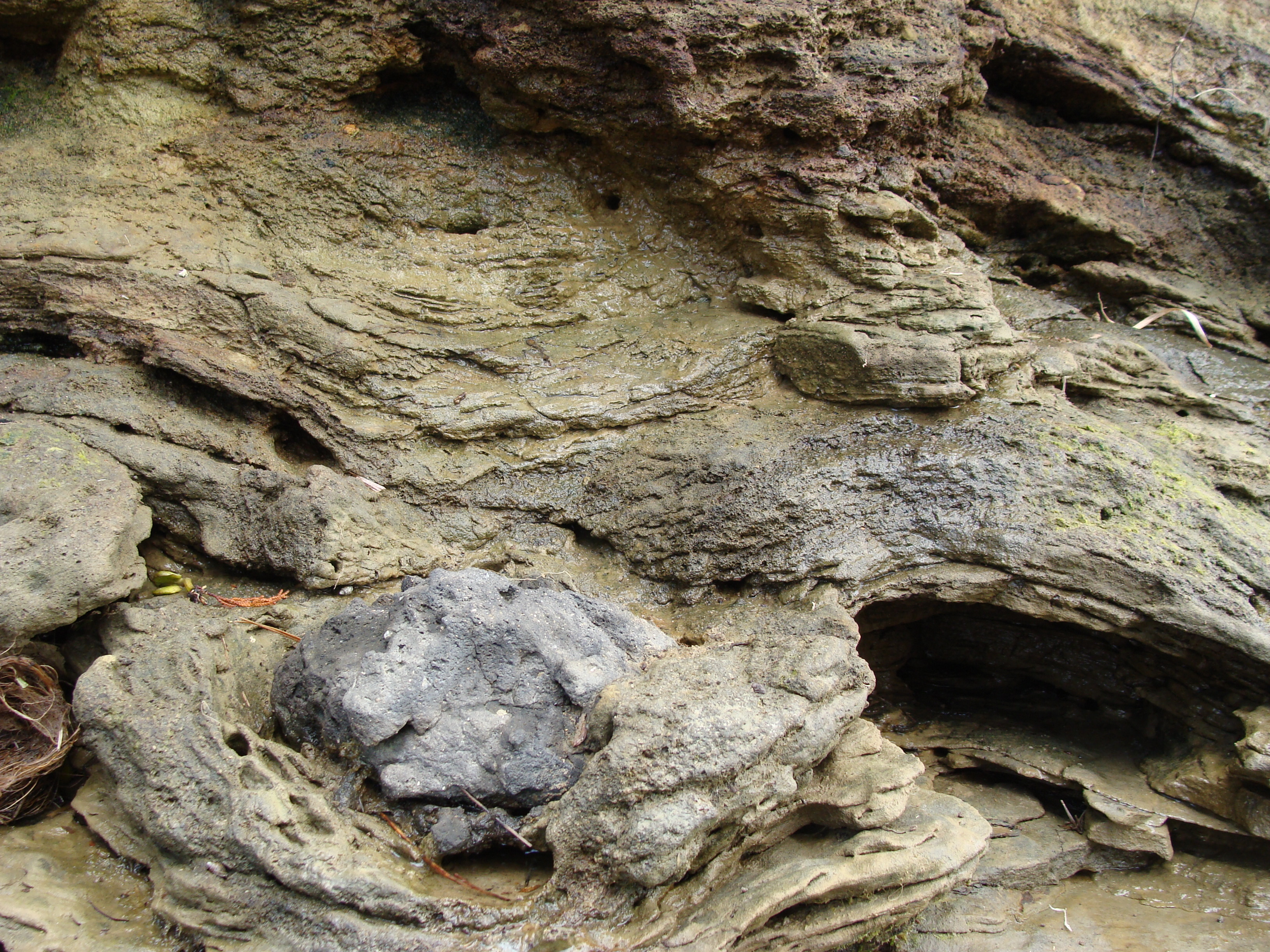
Eroding tuff layers with embedded basaltic rock, Pukewairiki
