= Te Tirarau Kukupa =

Te Tirarau Kukupa (?–1882) was a New Zealand iwi (tribal) leader, farmer and trader. Of Māori descent, he identified with the Ngā Puhi and Te Parawhau iwi. He was one of the rangatira (chiefs) who signed the Waitangi sheet of Te Tiriti o Waitangi in May 1840, as well as He Whakaputanga earlier.
