= Westfield railway station =

Defunct train station in Auckland, New Zealand

Westfield
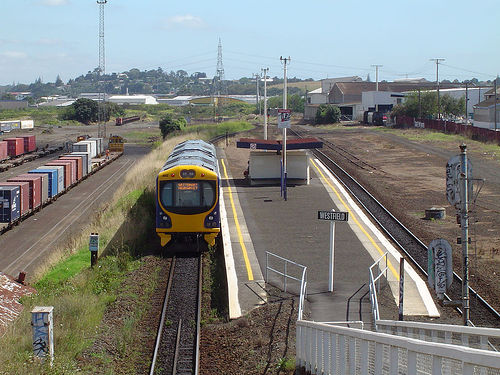
- The station platform in 2005, viewed from the pedestrian bridge leading to KiwiRail's operations centre and locomotive facility.

General information
- Location: Westfield, Auckland; New Zealand
- Line: North Island Main Trunk
- Distance: 665.5 km (413.5 mi) from Wellington
- Tracks: Mainline (2)

Construction
- Parking: No
- Cycle facilities: No

Other information
- Station code: WSF

History
- Opened: June 1875
- Closed: 12 March 2017
- Electrified: April 2014

Passengers
- Passengers per weekday
- 2003: 114
- 2004: 229 ▲100.88%
- 2005: 143 ▼37.55%
- 2006: 185 ▲29.37%
- 2007: 208 ▲12.43%
- 2008: 248 ▲19.23%
- 2009: 394 ▲58.87%
- 2010: 268 ▼31.98%
- 2011: 354 ▲32.09%

Adjacent stations
Preceding station	KiwiRail	Following station
Sylvia Park	North Island Main Trunk	Ōtāhuhu
Southdown; Closed 2004	North Auckland Line	Junction station
Location

Westfield railway station was a station of the Auckland railway network in the Westfield industrial precinct, Auckland, New Zealand. The station opened to passengers in 1887. It was closed to all services in 2017.

The station was located 640 metres south of Westfield Junction, where the Eastern and Southern Lines converge. It therefore served both lines. It had an island platform layout and was reached from a pedestrian overbridge at the end of Portage Road. The overbridge also spanned the adjacent Westfield marshalling yards and gave access to KiwiRail's operations centre and locomotive facility.

== Westfield marshalling yard ==
Built in the 1960s on reclaimed land, the yard is used for the building and distribution of freight trains, and as a marshalling yard for all types of services. It can cater to trains up to 900m long.

The yard brought together freight train marshalling and sorting services from several other yards in the Auckland area. Prior to its opening, freight trains were made up in the yards of Auckland or Otahuhu stations. The traffic offices in other stations in the Auckland area were centralised at Westfield during the 1970s and 1980s.

Northern Explorer trains are stabled in the Westfield yard (as of December 2023.)

== History ==
The Auckland and Mercer Railway opened to regular passenger services on 20 May 1875, built by Brogden & Co, who extended it from Penrose.

=== Early sidings ===
Fisher's siding was built in c. 1874 for J. Fisher & Company, at a location known as St. Ann's bridge, referencing a bridge built by early European settlers and named after the barque 'Ann'. A slaughterhouse was opened in c. 1879. Fisher's was taken over by the New Zealand Frozen Meat and Storage Company in 1883. The company had a manure works which was sold to Kempthorne Prosser & Co. in 1889. The slaughterhouse was taken over by the Auckland Freezing Company in 1894, then R. & W. Hellaby Limited in c. 1904.

In 1883 the Union Oil Soap and Candle Co. moved to the area. Later it became Taniwha Products Ltd. By 1897 they had established a private siding.

=== Station opening ===
On 29 August 1887 the Westfield station opened to passengers, following an 1883 petition asking for a flag station and station from which to run private sidings, at St Ann's Bridge.

=== Industrial development ===
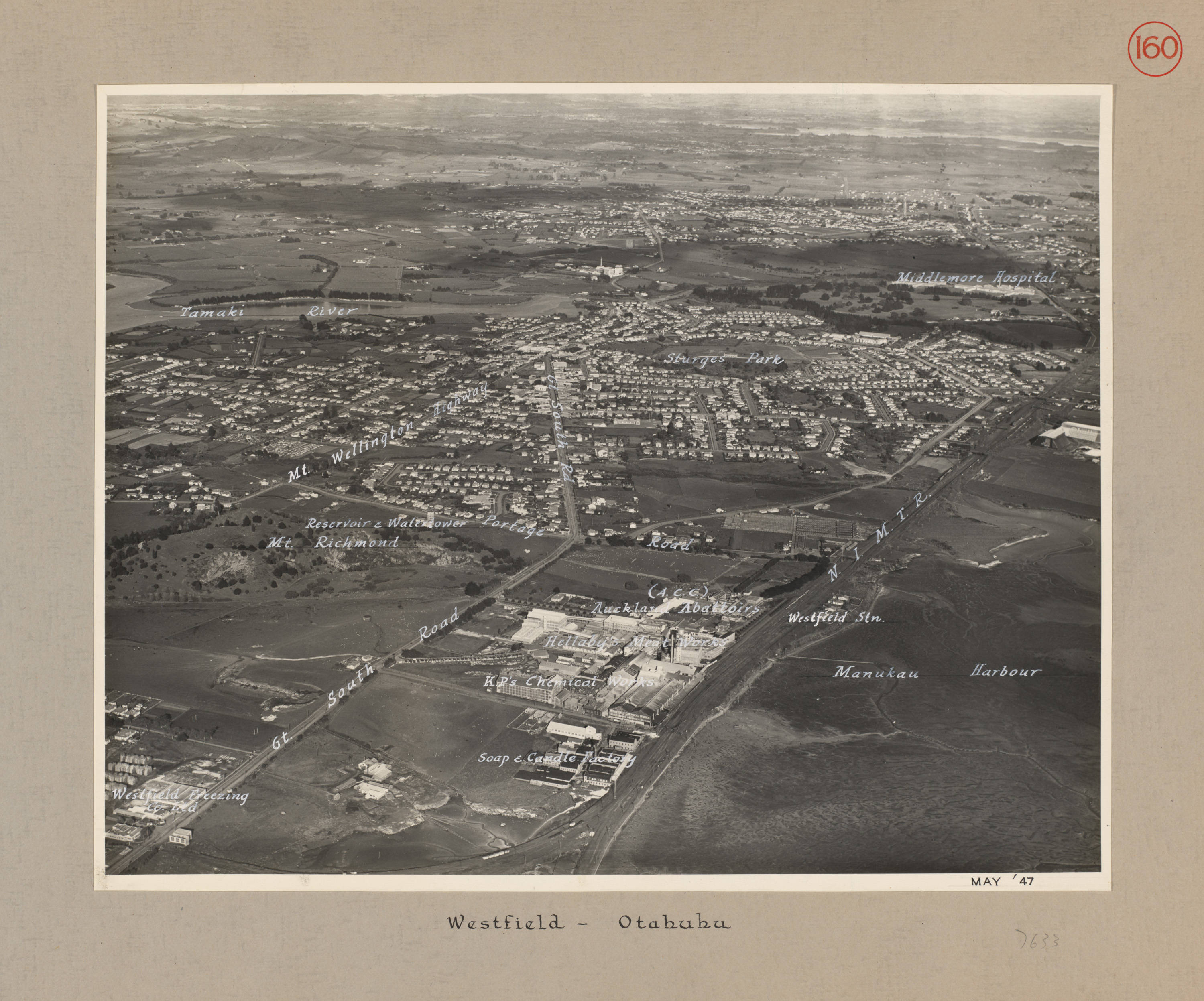
Annotated aerial photograph of Westfield in 1947

The Westfield Chemical Works was opened in 1887 by Kempthorne Prosser & Co.'s New Zealand Drug Co. Ltd.. Products included Westfield Manures and superphosphate fertilizer. By 1901 a private siding had been established at the Westfield Manure Works.

In 1908 the Auckland City Municipal Abattoir moved from Western Springs to Westfield. By 1911 a private siding had been established.

In 1911 R. & W. Hellaby Limited opened a new freezing works next to the railway station, where it moved its operations from Westmere. Hellaby's new works included a 35-foot turntable and extensive sidings, which were used to transport livestock and coal inwards, and tallow, fresh meat, tinned meat, and other products outwards.

On 29 May 1916 the Westfield Freezing Works was opened near the railway line. At its peak it was one of the largest meat processing plants in New Zealand, and had a workforce of around 2,000. A Hudswell Clarke locomotive worked the sidings. This was joined, in 1966, by a steam locomotive, built by Andrew Barclay Sons & Co., later converted to diesel in 1972 by A&G Price. Both locomotives are now stored at the Ngongotahā Railway Park awaiting restoration.

=== Station upgrades ===
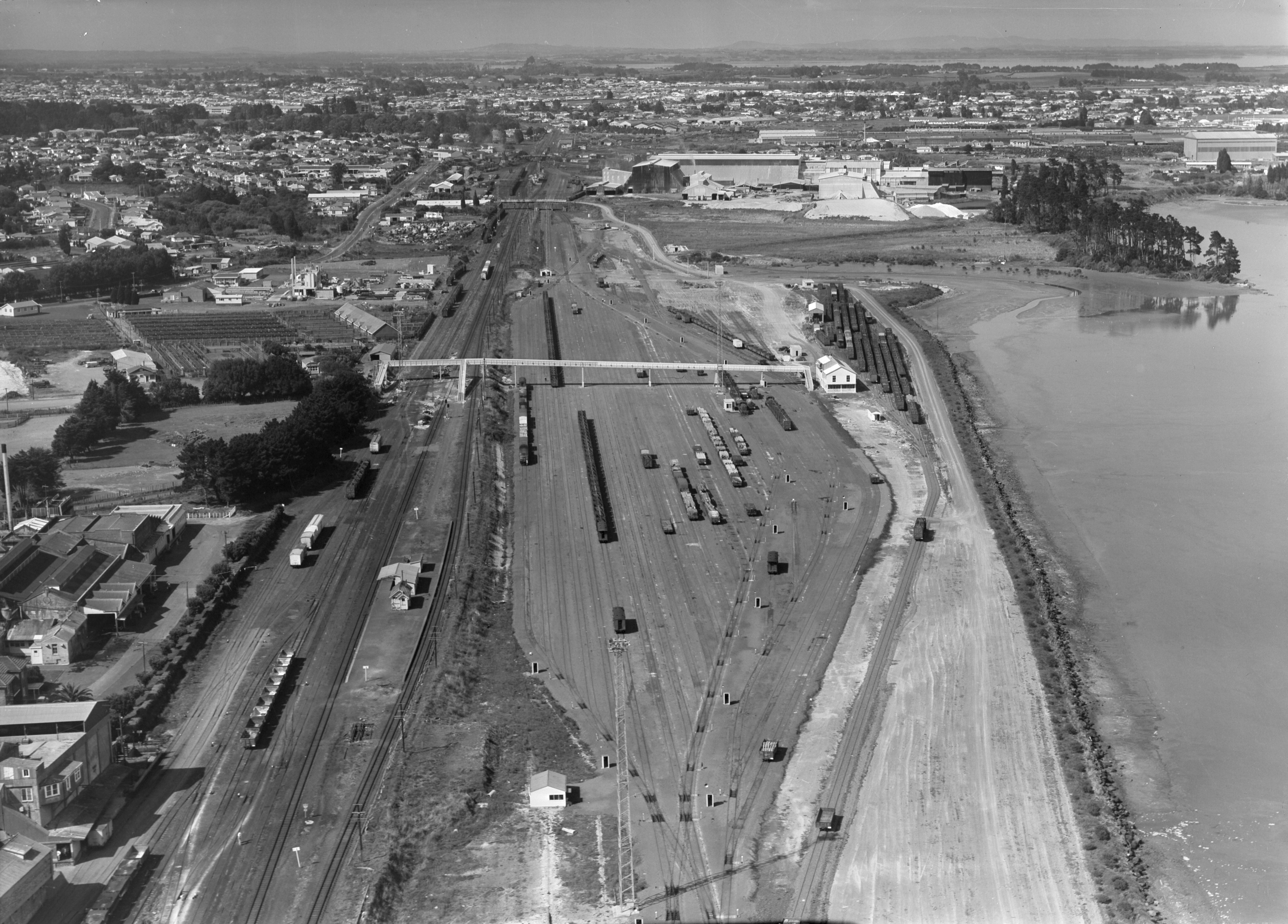
Westfield Station shortly after the yard opened, 1962

The Westfield station platform was too short to accommodate the suburban trains, which overlapped the platform by about three cars length, causing difficulty for passengers as the path was rough and with exposed interlocking signal rods. The platform was lengthened in c. 1922, and a new station building was approved in 1923.

In 1926 the main line through the station was duplicated. The second line from Penrose to Westfield was opened on 18 January, and the second line from Westfield to Otahuhu was opened on 5 December. There was no overbridge, so passengers needed to cross three tracks to gain access to the platform. By 1941 two pedestrian overbridges had been built, at the ends of Portage and Bell Roads.

Westfield became a junction station between the North Island Main Trunk and the North Auckland Line when the double-tracked Westfield deviation was completed in 1930, providing an alternative route to Auckland.

Construction of the Westfield Marshalling Yard started in March 1958. It opened on 7 January 1962 "…to serve as the main terminal for almost all the goods traffic in and out of the Auckland metropolitan area." The 51-acre yard included a 472-foot long pre-stressed concrete footbridge, 75-foot electric turntable, 50-ton weighbridge, fuelling, sanding, and servicing facilities. The main sorting grids consisted of 18 tracks able to accommodate 1,515 wagons. Lighting for 24-hour operation was provided by three 120-foot floodlight towers. An administration block provided accommodation for staff. By 1968 a car and wagon depot, diesel locomotive depot, diesel service depot, and a yardmaster's building had been completed.

The main signal relay shelter was destroyed by fire on 19 November 1967. Emergency operations continued in the area until 27 November 1967 when the signal system was restored. The cost of replacing the building and equipment was $12,000.

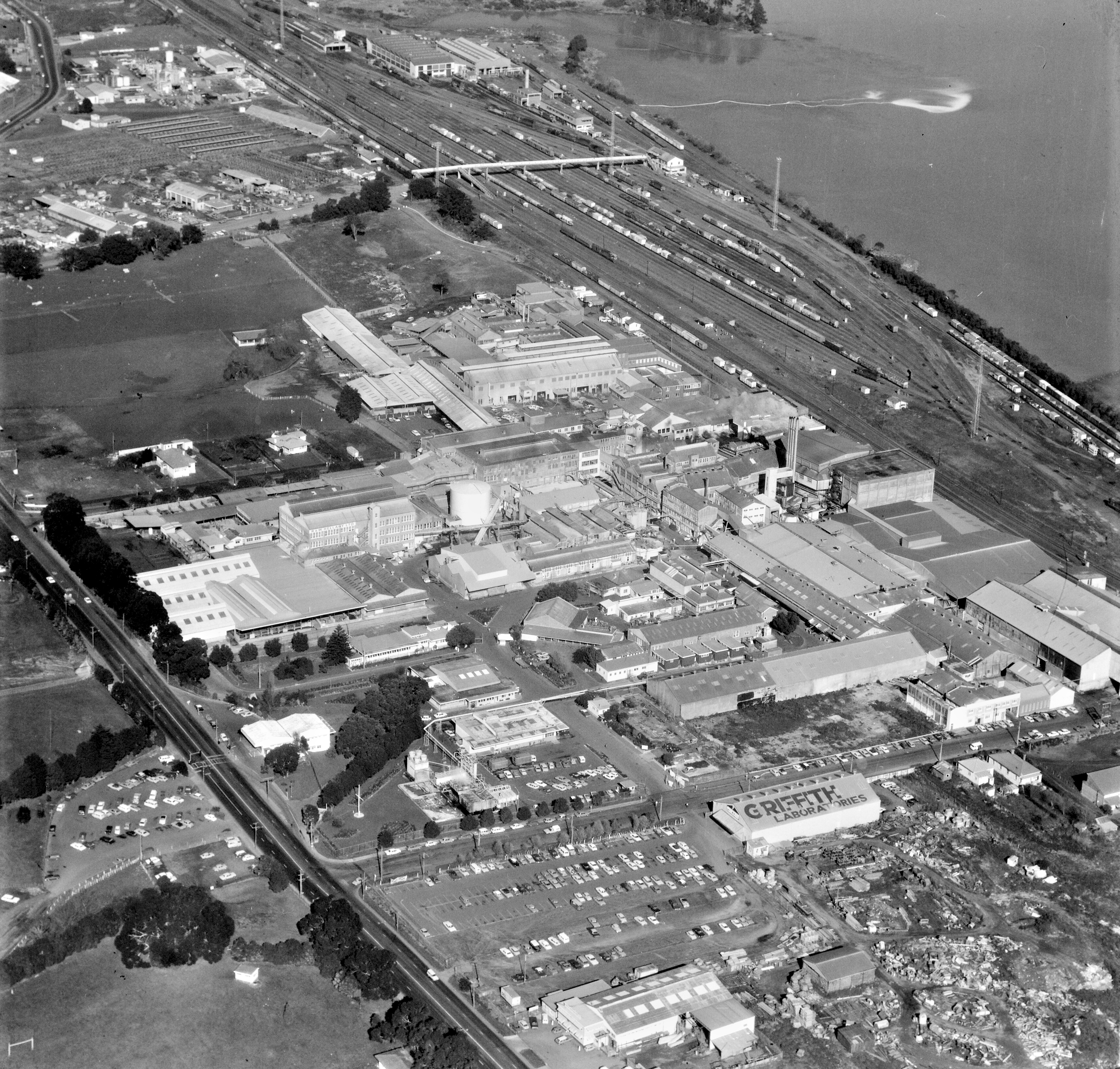
Factories, including Hellaby's and Kempthorne Prosser, with the Westfield railway station and yards in the background, 1977

In 1973 a concrete block station shelter was constructed, replacing the older station building which was in poor condition and too large for requirements. At this point the platform was 122m long and 300mm above rail level. The only access to the platform was from Portage Road via the yard footbridge at the southern end, a 300 metre walk.

In 1978 construction of a new station platform and shelter was approved, at a cost of $67,000. The asphalt platform would be 150m in length, 680mm above rail level. It was proposed to locate the new platform as close to the bottom of the footbridge as possible. By 1983 a platform and shelter had been built close to the bridge.

=== Decline and closure ===
Taniwha Products Ltd. closed in April 1979. Hellaby's ceased operations in 1982. The Westfield Freezing Works ceased in 1989. The Westfield Chemical Works was partially demolished and converted for new use in the 1990s.

In April 2010, the concrete block shelter was torn down and replaced with shelters formerly used at the temporary Newmarket stations. In 2014 the tracks through the station were electrified using 25 kV AC overhead lines.

Following consultations with the public in 2013, Auckland Transport closed the station in 2017, because fewer than 330 passengers used it daily and it required a costly upgrade. Both the platform and footbridge were demolished in 2021.

== Locomotive dump ==
During the 1920s, obsolete locomotives were often dumped in areas where the railway line was subject to erosion or soft ground, the value of scrap iron being minimal at the time. Later the locomotives at Westfield were retrieved and sold for scrap.

=== Known locomotives dumped at Westfield ===
Class and road number	Type	Builder	Builder's number	Notes
K93	2-4-2	Rogers	2469	Frame and wheels only; boiler subsequently used at Newmarket Railway Workshops.
K96	2-4-2	Rogers	2473	Frame and wheels only; boiler subsequently used at Paekakariki and later dumped on the coast south of Paekakariki
N351	2-6-2	Baldwin	19270	
N352	2-6-2	Baldwin	19271	
N353	2-6-2	Baldwin	19272	
N354	2-6-2	Baldwin	19273	
L264	4-4-2T	NZR Newmarket	40	
L267	4-4-2T	NZR Newmarket	31	
T102	2-8-0	Baldwin	4661	

== See also ==
- List of Auckland railway stations
- Otahuhu Workshops
- Southdown railway station
- Westfield Junction
