= Kempthorne =

Kempthorne is a Cornish surname, and may refer to:

- Dirk Kempthorne (1951–2026), American politician
- John Kempthorne (Royal Navy officer) (1620–1679), Cornish admiral
- John Kempthorne (hymnwriter) (1775–1838), Cornish clergyman
- John Kempthorne (bishop) (1864–1946), Anglican Bishop of Lichfield
- Oscar Kempthorne (1919–2000), British statistician
- Patricia Kempthorne (born 1953), American former First Lady of Idaho
- Pratt Kempthorne (1849–1931), New Zealand Anglican priest
- Sampson Kempthorne (1809–1873), English-New Zealand architect
- Stanley Kempthorne (1886–1963), New Zealand Anglican bishop in Oceania
- Thomas Whitelock Kempthorne (c.1834–1915), New Zealand manufacturing chemist and businessman

== See also ==
- Kempthorne Prosser, a former drug and fertiliser manufacturer in New Zealand
- HMS Kempthorne, a Captain-class frigate of the Royal Navy
