= Westfield, New Zealand =

Westfield
- Industrial area
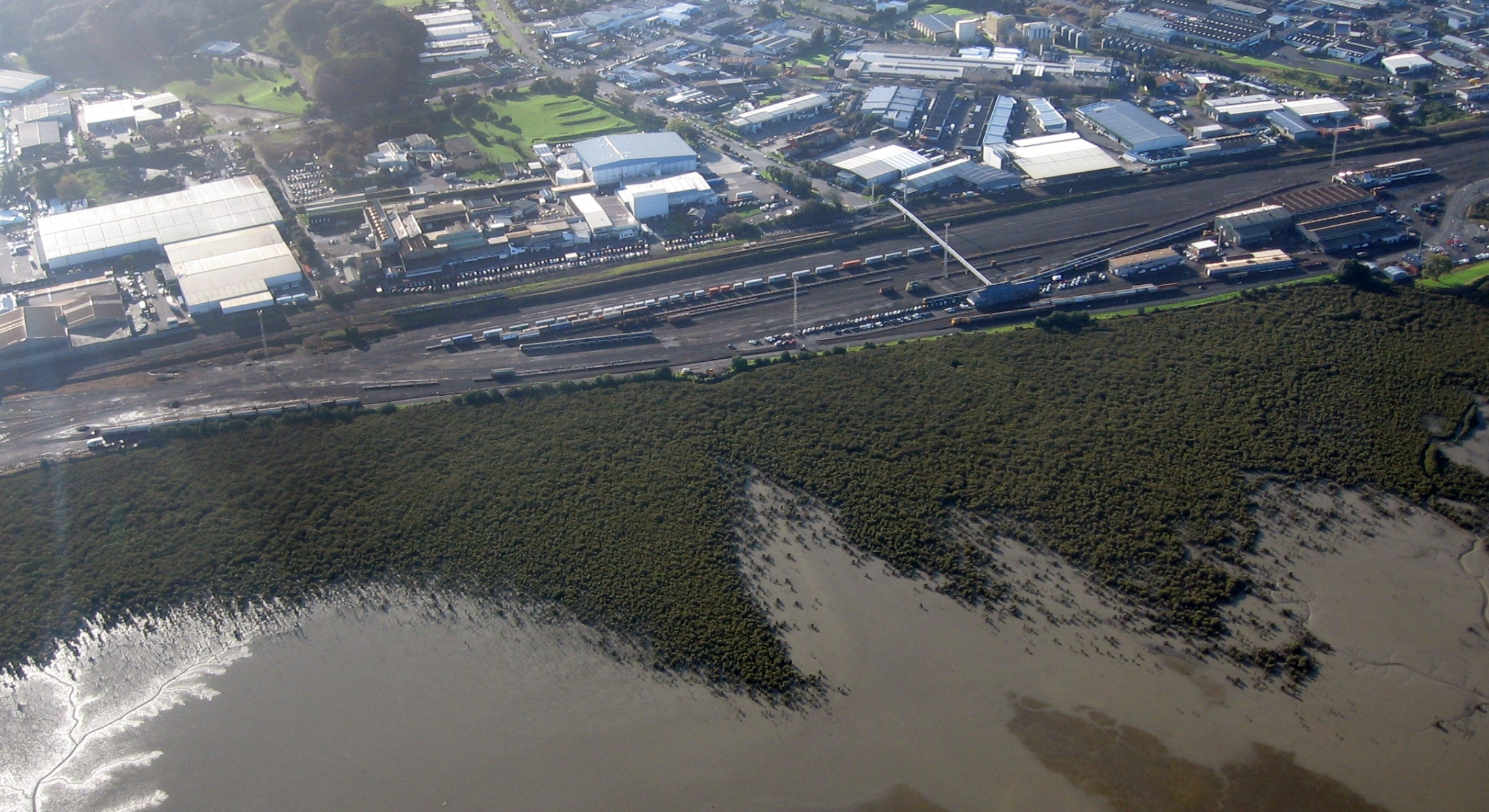
- Railway infrastructure in Westfield, with the Manukau Harbour in the foreground and industrial buildings in the background.
- Interactive map of Westfield
- Coordinates: 36°57′S 174°51′E
- Country: New Zealand
- Region: Auckland Region
- City: Auckland
- Local authority: Auckland Council
- Suburb: Mount Wellington

Southdown, Penrose	Mutukāroa / Hamlins Hill	Mount Wellington
Mangere Inlet	Westfield	Tāmaki River, Pakuranga
Favona	Ōtāhuhu

Westfield is the unofficial name of an industrial area in the south of Mount Wellington, Auckland, New Zealand.

For many years the abattoirs located here were discharging large amounts of untreated waste into Manukau Harbour. This had a detrimental effect on the ecology of the harbour, which at the turn of the 20th century had been a popular and attractive place to swim, sail, fish and gather shell fish. For most of the middle of the 20th century it was a health hazard and its shell-fish a probable source of food poisoning. Since the freezing works disappeared the water quality has improved greatly.

There is a large railway marshalling yard located beside the Manukau Harbour.

Portage Road is the location of Te Tō Waka, one of the overland routes between the two harbours (and thus the Pacific Ocean and the Tasman Sea), where the Māori would beach their waka (canoes) and drag them overland to the other coast, thus avoiding having to paddle around North Cape. This made the area of immense strategic importance in both pre-European times and during the early years of European occupation.

== History ==
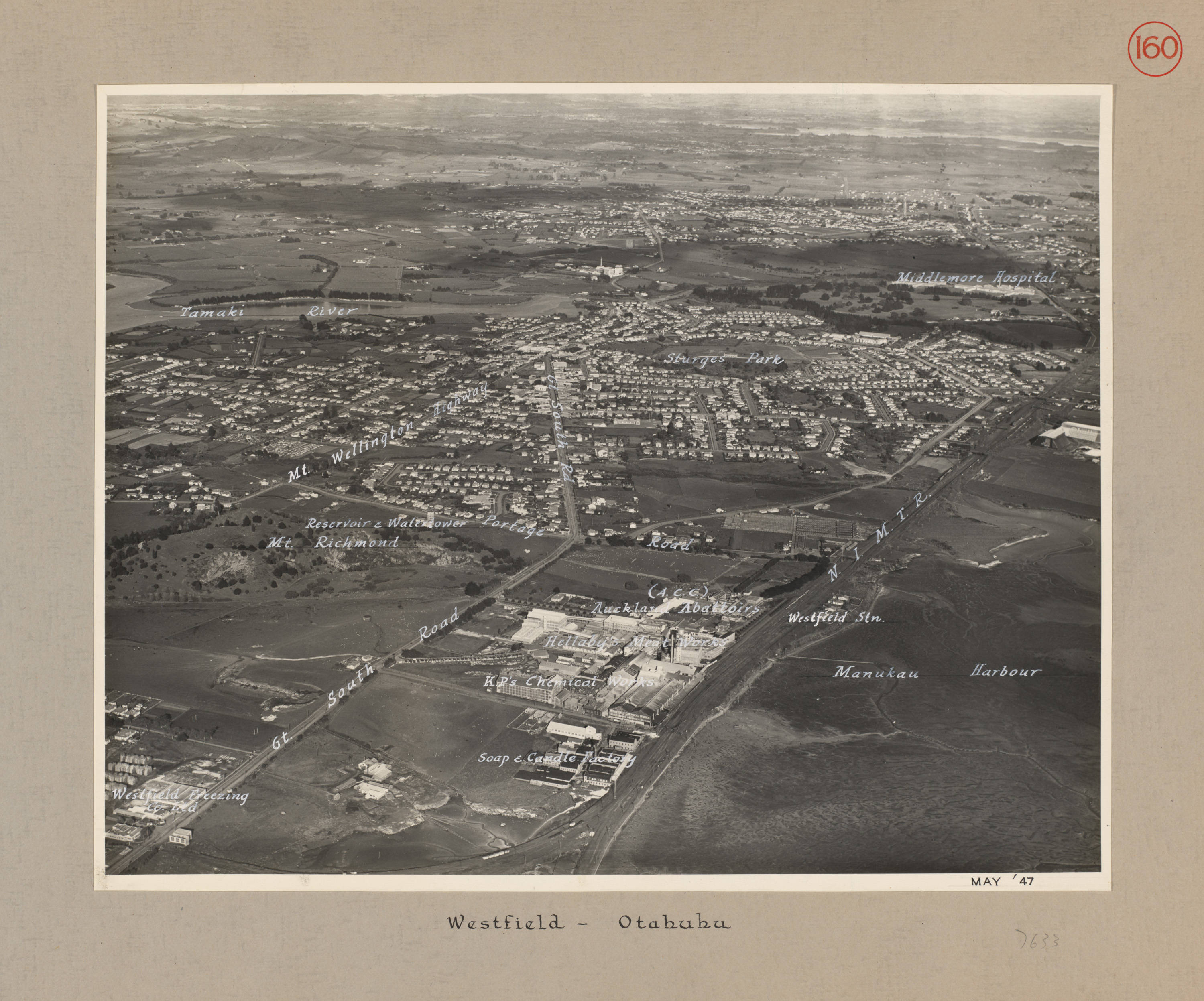
Annotated aerial photograph of Westfield in 1947

At one point during World War II there were plans to create a canal between the two harbours; this was not constructed but a canal reserve remains in place between the Tāmaki River and Manukau Harbour, midway between the Westfield and Otahuhu railway stations.

This was once the site of the Westfield Freezing Works, part of a large industrial zone located near the North Island Main Trunk railway at this point. The buildings were decommissioned during the 1980s and 1990s, releasing large areas of land to be redeveloped as office parks. Westfield was also the location of Kempthorne Prosser Limited's large Westfield Chemical Fertiliser Works which operated from 1887 to 1966. The works were demolished in the 1970s.

In March 2017, Westfield Railway Station was permanently closed due to low patronage. Auckland Transport announced it would have required a costly upgrade in order to keep it in operation.
