= Great South Road =

Great South Road may refer to:

- Great South Road (New South Wales), a historical road in Australia leading from Sydney to Goulburn
- Great South Road, New Zealand, a road between Auckland and Wellington
