= Great South Road, New Zealand =

Road in New Zealand

Coordinates: 36.88016°S 174.78288°E

Great South Road
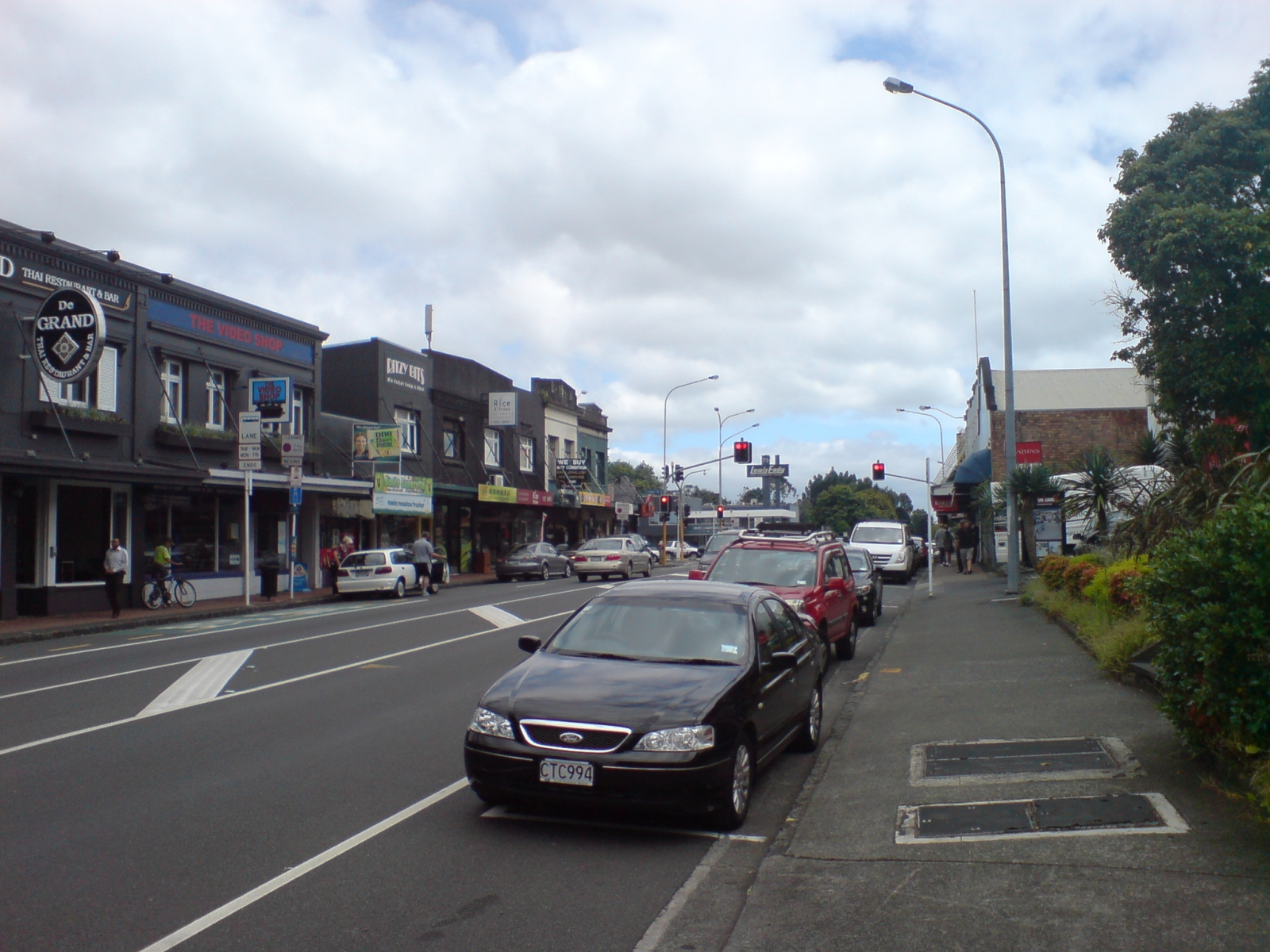
- These days, long parts of Great South Road's length are urban or suburban
- Length: 42.9 km (26.7 mi)
- Location: Auckland, New Zealand
- North end: Broadway/Manukau Road
- South end: Mill Road

The Great South Road is a major arterial road on the Auckland isthmus and South Auckland. Originally the northern section of the earliest highway between Auckland and Wellington, in the North Island of New Zealand, the road was the main route connecting Auckland to Hamilton. Many former sections of the road have been integrated into the Waikato Expressway. Currently four sections of the road remain: Epsom to Bombay in Auckland, the main street in Pōkeno, the former route of State Highway 1 that links the towns of Huntly, Taupiri, Ngāruawāhia and Horotiu, and the main road in Ōhaupō.

== History ==
Many sections of Great South Road were constructed on ara hīkoi; traditional walking paths used by Tāmaki Māori. The first sections of Great South Road were constructed in 1843. In 1851, the Tāmaki Bridge was constructed between Ōtāhuhu and Papatoetoe, opening up the south for greater development. By 1855, the road had reached as far south as Drury, from which a track led towards the Waikato River. In 1861, Governor George Grey ordered the construction of the Great South Road further into the Waikato, to improve supply lines through swampy and thickly forested country, prior to the Invasion of the Waikato. The road was constructed by British Army troops, including Dominic Jacotin Gamble, and provided a flow of supplies for the Waikato campaign. Queen's Redoubt at Pōkeno was a major base of operations for soldiers working on constructing the road. Approximately 12,000 soldiers were involved in the construction over two years.

Redoubts were constructed along the road for protection. St John's Redoubt was constructed in 1863 but never saw any engagement and the redoubt was abandoned shortly after in 1864.

Toll booths were set up along the road in 1866 at Newmarket, Ōtāhuhu and Drury in order to pay for upkeep costs of the Great South Road. Travellers along the Great South Road complained about the excessive cost of these tolls, which were abolished in 1875. After the wars, more peaceful uses predominated, and the road became the main social and commercial link to the growing agricultural areas south of Auckland.

Much of the road between Newmarket and Drury was laid in concrete in the 1920s, up to one foot thick. The road was later covered with asphalt. Originally, the road was marked by milestones, but these are now all believed lost, although there is a ‘22 mile’ milestone marker outside Drury School, in Drury. The Auckland Southern Motorway has largely superseded Great South Road as a through route, but many parts of the road are still in use, particularly the urban sections.

== Route ==
The road begins in the central Auckland suburb of Epsom, then passes through the suburbs of Greenlane, Penrose, Ōtāhuhu, Papatoetoe, Manukau, Manurewa and Papakura. Leaving the urban sprawl, it heads south through Drury before terminating at Mill Road in Bombay and merging with the Waikato Expressway. Historically it continued, over the Bombay Hills, and followed the east bank of the Waikato River until crossing it at Ngāruawāhia. A section of State Highway 3 through Ōhaupō retains the road's southernmost extension.

== Duplicate addresses ==
Along the 42 km of road, there are many instances of duplicate addresses. The address numbering restarts six times, being differentiated in Google Maps by suburb. For example there are five "1 Great South Road" addresses.

== Major intersections ==
Local Board	Suburb	km	jct	Destinations	Notes
Albert-Eden	Epsom	0.0		Manukau Road – Royal Oak, Onehunga; Alpers Avenue – City Centre; Broadway – Newmarket; St Marks Road	
Albert-Eden	Epsom	1.1		Market Road (east) – Remuera; Market Road (west) – Mount Eden	
Albert-Eden	Greenlane	2.3		Green Lane East – Remuera; Green Lane West – Western Springs	
Albert-Eden	Greenlane	2.7		Woodbine Avenue	
Albert-Eden	Greenlane	2.8		Campbell Road – Royal Oak	
Maungakiekie-Tāmaki	Ellerslie	2.8		Campbell Road – Royal Oak	
Maungakiekie-Tāmaki	Ellerslie	2.9		Main Highway – Ellerslie	
Maungakiekie-Tāmaki	Ellerslie	3.6		Rockfield Road	
Maungakiekie-Tāmaki	Ellerslie	3.9		Central Park business park	
Maungakiekie-Tāmaki	Penrose	4.1		Ellerslie Panmure Highway – Ellerslie	
Maungakiekie-Tāmaki	Penrose	4.8		Station Road East – Penrose	
Maungakiekie-Tāmaki	Penrose	5.5		Penrose Road – Mount Wellington	
Maungakiekie-Tāmaki	Penrose	6.4		South Eastern Highway – Mount Wellington, Pakuranga; Church Street – Onehunga, Royal Oak	
Maungakiekie-Tāmaki	Penrose	6.6		Church Street East	
Maungakiekie-Tāmaki	Penrose	7.1		Southdown Lane	
Maungakiekie-Tāmaki	Mount Wellington	7.5		Sylvia Park Road – Mount Wellington	
Maungakiekie-Tāmaki	Mount Wellington	7.9		Vestey Drive	
Maungakiekie-Tāmaki	Mount Wellington	8.8		Portage Road (east) – Mount Wellington; Portage Road (west) – Māngere, Manukau City	
Māngere-Ōtāhuhu	Ōtāhuhu	8.8		Portage Road (east) – Mount Wellington; Portage Road (west) – Māngere, Manukau City	
Māngere-Ōtāhuhu	Ōtāhuhu	9.4		Albion Road; Huia Road	
Māngere-Ōtāhuhu	Ōtāhuhu	9.5		Princes Street	
Māngere-Ōtāhuhu	Ōtāhuhu	9.8		Avenue Road; Mason Avenue	
Māngere-Ōtāhuhu	Ōtāhuhu	10.1		Atkinson Avenue; High Street	
Māngere-Ōtāhuhu	Ōtāhuhu	10.8		Mangere Road – Māngere, Middlemore Hospital, Airport	
Ōtara-Papatoetoe	Papatoetoe	11.8		Bairds Road – Ōtara, MIT	
Ōtara-Papatoetoe	Papatoetoe	13.0		Shirley Road	
Ōtara-Papatoetoe	Papatoetoe	13.2		East Tamaki Road – Ōtara, East Tāmaki	
Ōtara-Papatoetoe	Papatoetoe	13.3		Kolmar Road	
Ōtara-Papatoetoe	Papatoetoe	13.5		Sutton Crescent	
Ōtara-Papatoetoe	Papatoetoe	13.9		Tui Road; St George Street	
Ōtara-Papatoetoe	Manukau	15.4		Reagan Road; Puhinui Road – Airport	
Ōtara-Papatoetoe	Manukau	15.9		Ryan Place	
Ōtara-Papatoetoe	Manukau	16.1		Te Irirangi Drive – Howick; Cavendish Drive – Airport	
Ōtara-Papatoetoe	Manukau	16.2		Southpoint retail park	
Ōtara-Papatoetoe	Manukau	16.4		Ronwood Avenue	
Ōtara-Papatoetoe	Manukau	16.8		Redoubt Road; Manukau Station Road – Manukau City Centre	Former SH 20
Ōtara-Papatoetoe	Manukau	17.0		Lakewood Court	
Manurewa	Wiri	17.2		from SH 1 (Southern Motorway)	
Manurewa	Wiri	18.0		Kerrs Road	
Manurewa	Manurewa	18.8		Orams Road – Totara Heights; Browns Road – Homai	
Manurewa	Manurewa	20.2		Hill Road	
Manurewa	Manurewa	20.3		Station Road	
Manurewa	Manurewa	20.6		Alfriston Road – Alfriston, Clevedon; Weymouth Road – Clendon, Homai	
Manurewa	Manurewa	21.8		Mahia Road – Wattle Downs, Clendon	
Papakura	Takanini	22.3		SH 1 north (Southern Motorway) – Auckland	
Papakura	Takanini	22.6		SH 1 south (Southern Motorway) – Hamilton	
Papakura	Takanini	23.0		Manuroa Road; Beaumaris Way	
Papakura	Takanini	23.5		Taka Street; Walter Strevens Drive	
Papakura	Takanini	24.2		Glenora Road	
Papakura	Takanini	24.3		The Furlong	
Papakura	Takanini	24.7		Walters Road; Inlet Road; Longford Park Drive	
Papakura	Takanini	25.1		Waka Street	
Papakura	Papakura	26.1		Subway Road	
Papakura	Papakura	26.3		O'Shannessey Street	
Papakura	Papakura	26.4		Queen Street	
Papakura	Papakura	26.5		Broadway; Elliot Street	
Papakura	Papakura	26.9		Wood Street	
Papakura	Papakura	27.1		Wellington Street	
Papakura	Ōpaheke	27.7		Settlement Road; Beach Road	
Papakura	Drury	31.4		Waihoehoe Road; Norrie Road	
Papakura	Drury	32.0		SH 1 south (Southern Motorway) – Hamilton	SH 22 begins
Papakura	Drury	32.2		SH 1 north (Southern Motorway) – Auckland	
Franklin	Bombay	42.5		Mill Road	
Franklin	Bombay	42.9		SH 1 south (Waikato Expressway) – Hamilton	

== See also ==
- New Zealand state highway network
