= Mutukāroa / Hamlins Hill Regional Park =

Regional Park in Auckland, New Zealand

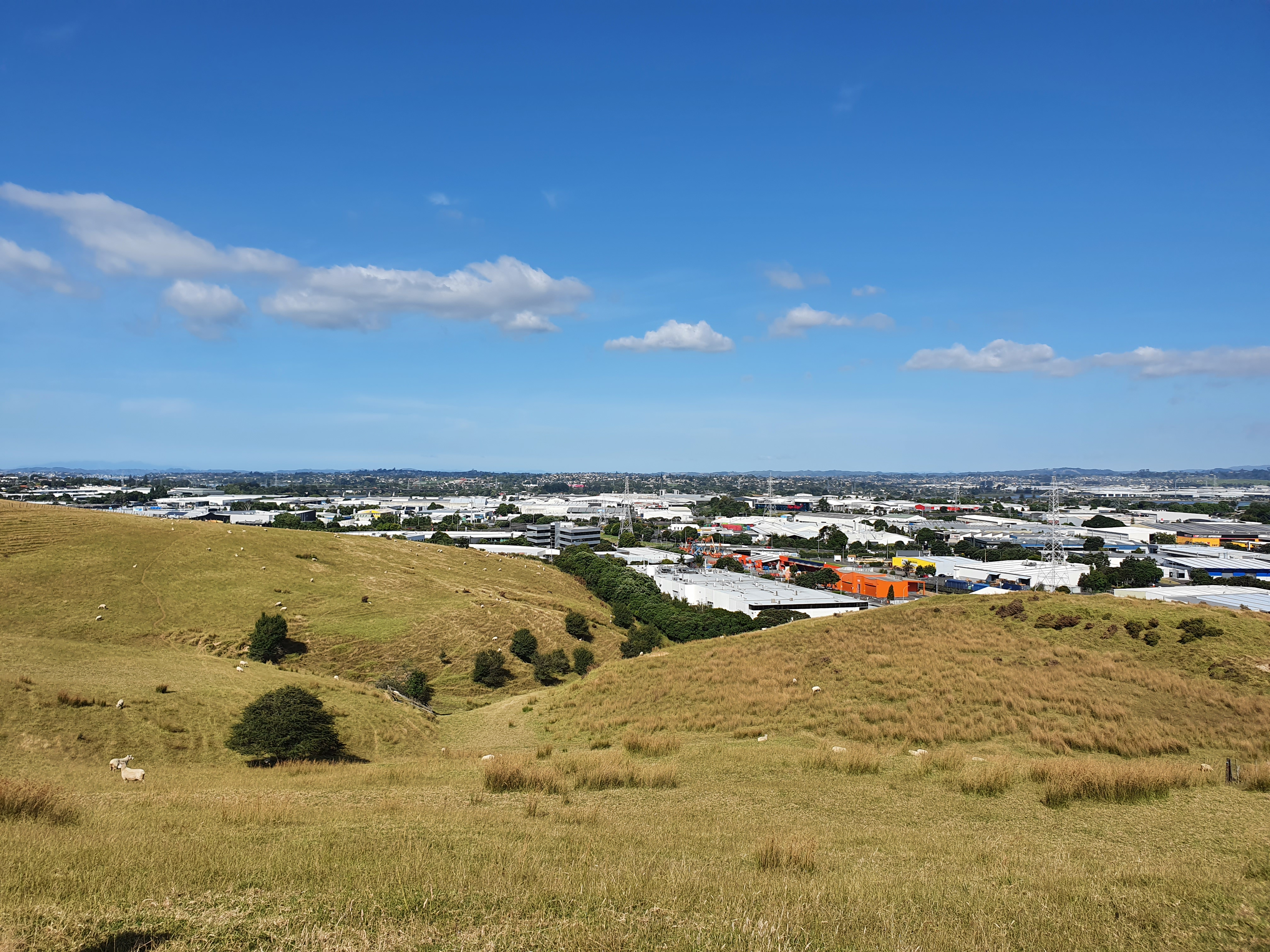
- Looking east from Mutukaroa / Hamlins Hill Regional Park
- Interactive map of Mutukāroa / Hamlins Hill Regional Park
- Location: Penrose, Auckland, New Zealand
- Coordinates: 36.920°S 174.832°E
- Area: 48 ha (120 acres)
- Operator: Auckland Council

Mutukāroa / Hamlins Hill Regional Park is a regional park situated in the Auckland suburb of Penrose, north-east of the Manukau Harbour and west of the Tāmaki River. The park is owned and operated by Auckland Council.

== Geography ==
Mutukāroa / Hamlins Hill is the largest non-volcanic hill on the Auckland isthmus. It is formed from Waitemata sandstone, surrounded by much younger volcanic deposits. The hill is 65 metres high.

The regional park is predominantly made up of two European farms, Hamlin's Farm and Penrose Farm.

== History ==
Mutukaroa is the site of one of the largest kāinga (undefended settlements) on the Tāmaki isthmus, surrounded by vast kūmara gardens. During the Waiohua period, the hill was a residence for Ngāi Tai, who continued to occupy the hill after Ngāti Whātua Ōrākei settled the isthmus in the 18th century.

The name Hamlin(s) Hill comes from James Hamlin, a reverend of the Church Missionary Society, who received the land as part of a Crown land grant in the 1840s. For many years, the farmland on the hill was used as holding paddocks for the Westfield Freezing Works. The hill was planned for demolition in the 1960s, as a part of a plan to reclaim 30 hectares of land from the Manukau Harbour. The hill was saved after a public outcry and court action.

Since the early 2000s, native trees have been planted on the hill. The hill was officially gazetted as Mutukaroa / Hamlin Hill in 2014.

== Gallery ==
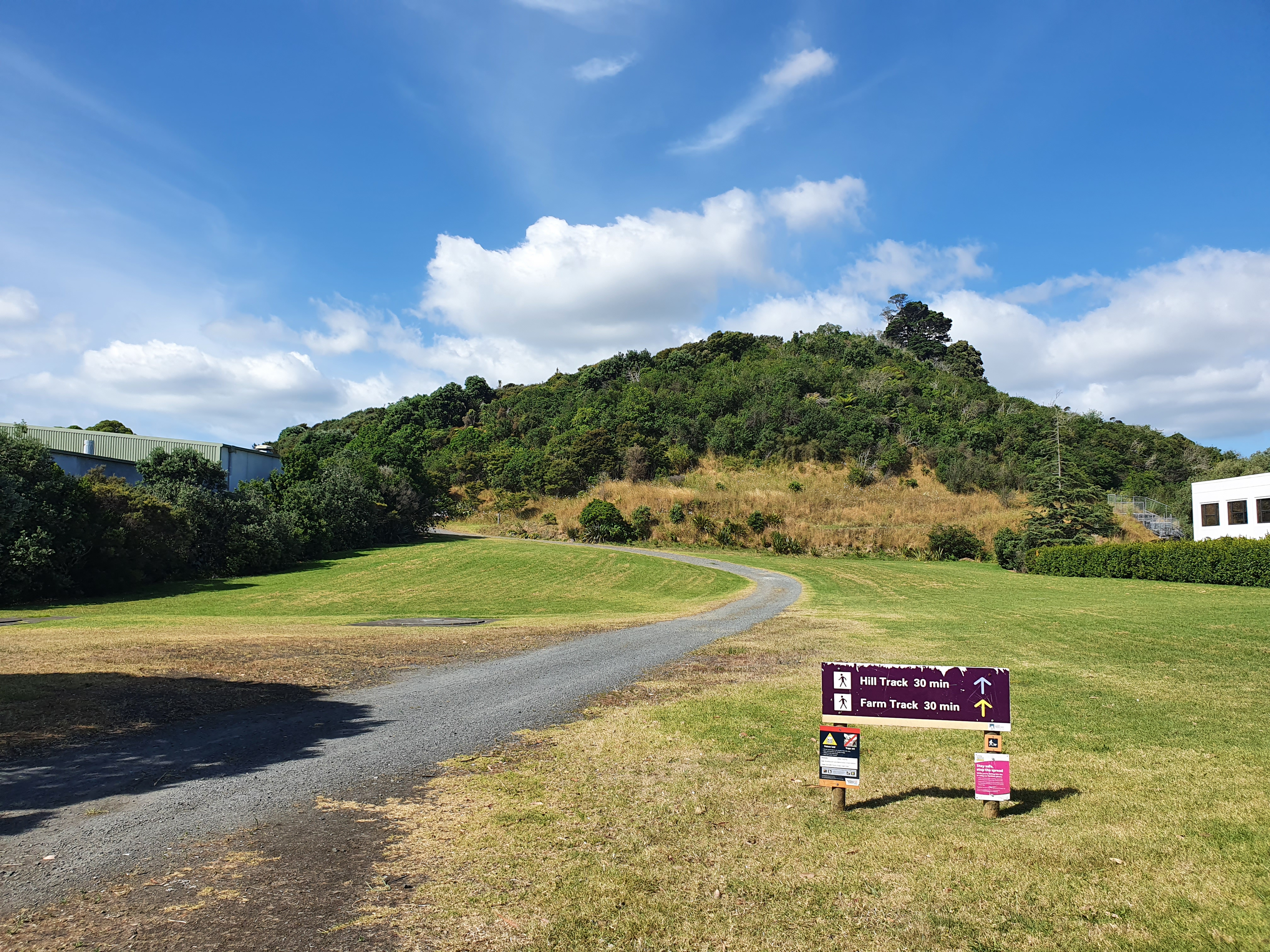
Entrance to the park

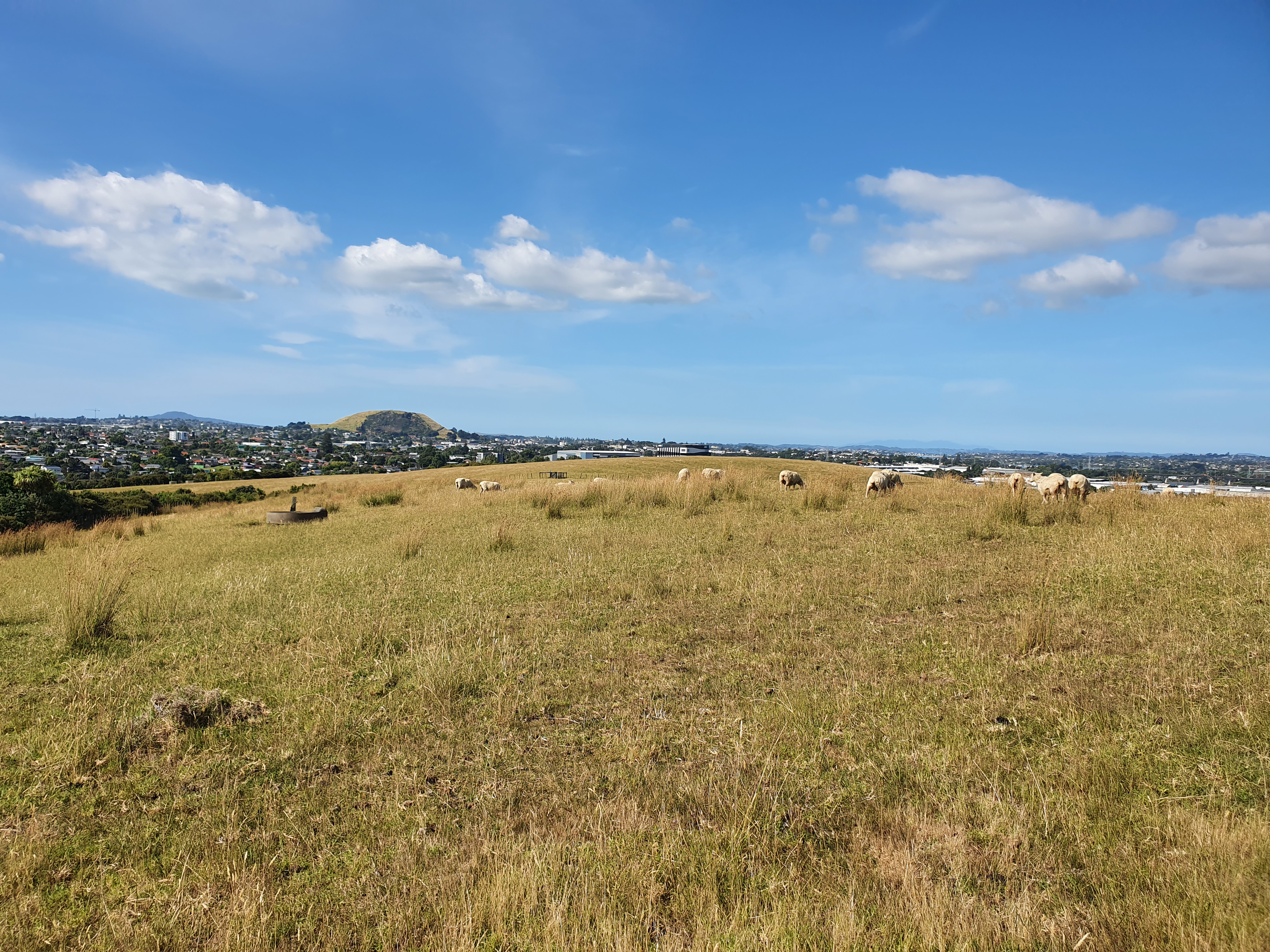
Sheep grazing on the fielded area at the top of Mutukaroa / Hamlin Hill

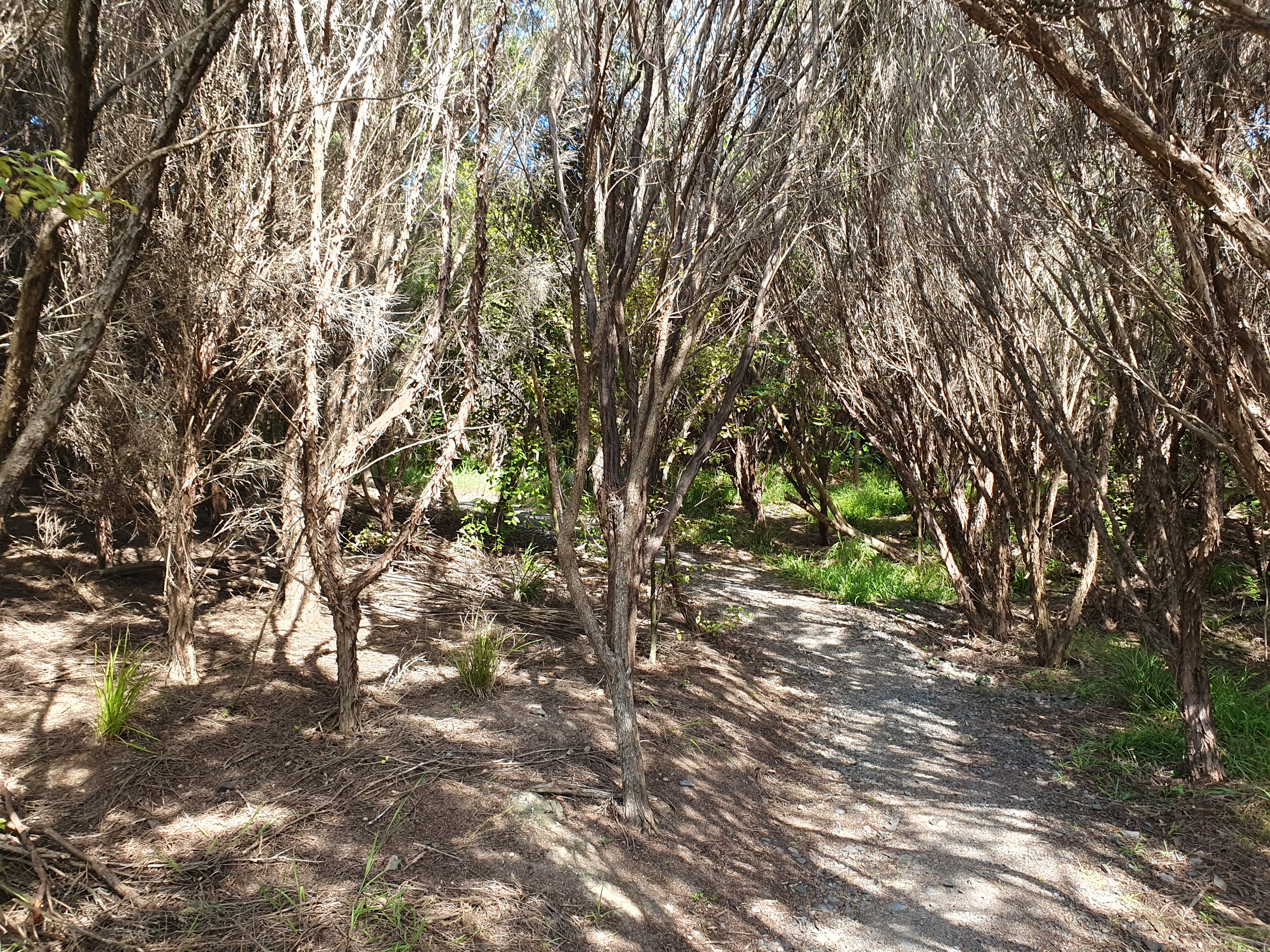
Forested tracks within the regional park
