= Clendon =

Clendon is both a surname and a given name. Notable people with the name include:

- David Clendon (born 1955), New Zealand politician
- James Reddy Clendon (1800–1872), early European settler in New Zealand
- Clendon Thomas (born 1935), American football player

== See also ==
- Clendon Park, a suburb of Auckland, New Zealand
