= Thomas Whitelock Kempthorne =

Thomas Whitelock Kempthorne (c.1834–3 November 1915) was a New Zealand manufacturing chemist and businessman who co-founded Kempthorne Prosser in 1870 in Dunedin. He was born in Cornwall, England c.1834.

== See also ==
- Kempthorne Prosser
