= Westfield Freezing Works =

Former slaughterhouse in Auckland, New Zealand

Coordinates: 36.92570°S 174.83550°E

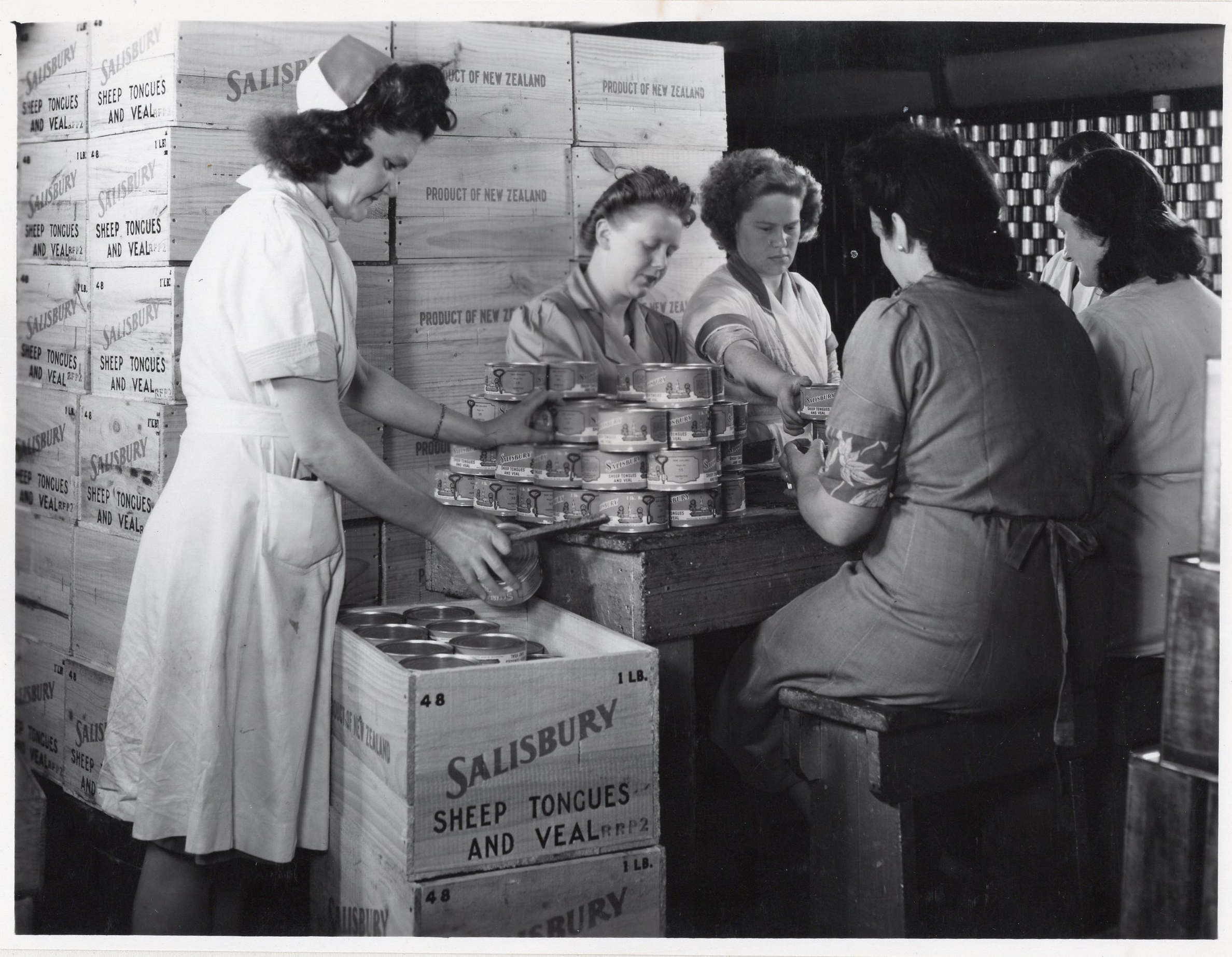
- Packing canned meat
- Industry: Meat Processing
- Founded: 1916
- Defunct: 1989
- Headquarters: Auckland, New Zealand
- Owner: Westfield Freezing Company Limited
- Number of employees: 2,000
- Parent: W & R Fletcher Limited, London, United Kingdom

The Westfield Freezing Works was a large freezing works in the Auckland suburb of Westfield, New Zealand. It was one of the largest meat processing plants in New Zealand, and had a workforce of around 2,000.

== History ==
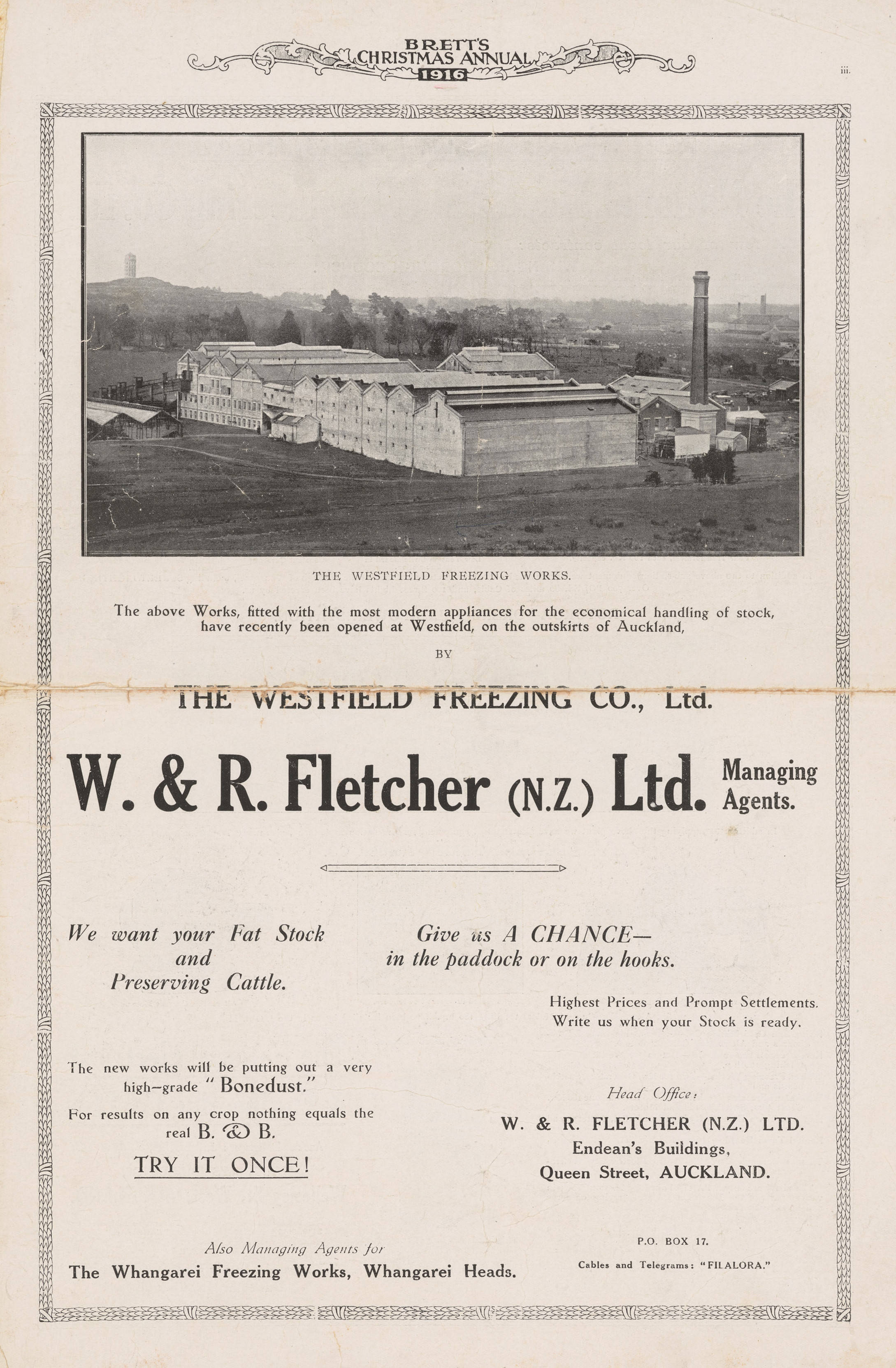
Advertisement in Brett's Christmas Annual, 1916

In c.1915 W & R Fletcher Limited started construction on the Westfield Freezing Works on the Great South Road near the railway line. The works were opened by Prime Minister William Massey on 29th of May 1916.

As early as 1917 the works were being expanded, with large additions made to the cold storage unit.

=== Closure ===
The works ceased operations in 1989, and the buildings were demolished in 1994. At a ceremony on 10 March 1995 Prime Minister Jim Bolger opened a new industrial estate on the site.

== Shunting Locomotives ==
A Hudswell Clarke locomotive worked the sidings. This was joined, in 1966, by a steam locomotive, built by Andrew Barclay Sons & Co. then converted to diesel in 1972 by A&G Price. Both locomotives are now stored at the Ngongotahā Railway Park awaiting restoration.

== Other nearby freezing works ==
Several slaughterhouses were established in the early days of industry in Otahuhu. One was attached to Hall’s Store on Great South Road and another on the site of Otahuhu College.

Circa 1879 a third was established by J. Fisher & Company, this was taken over by the New Zealand Frozen Meat and Storage Company in 1883, then by the Auckland Freezing Company, then by R. & W. Hellaby Limited. In 1911 Hellaby's opened a new abattoir at Westfield, where it moved its operations from Westmere. Hellaby's later became the Shortland Freezing Company. Operations ceased in 1982 and most of the buildings were demolished in 1993.

In 1903 the Auckland Farmers Freezing Company (AFFCO) was formed. They established a freezing works nearby at Southdown in 1905, which was closed in 1981. The buildings were later removed or burnt down.

In 1908 the Auckland City Municipal Abattoir moved from Western Springs to Westfield.

== In popular culture ==
- In August 1987 The Skeptics made a music video for the Skeptics III track AFFCO, named after the New Zealand meat processing company AFFCO. The video includes graphic footage of lambs being slaughtered and cut up, filmed on the "sheep floor" at Westfield.

== Notable former employees ==
- Anand Satyanand
- David Lange
- Phil Goff
