= Kempthorne Prosser =

Pharmaceutical company in New Zealand

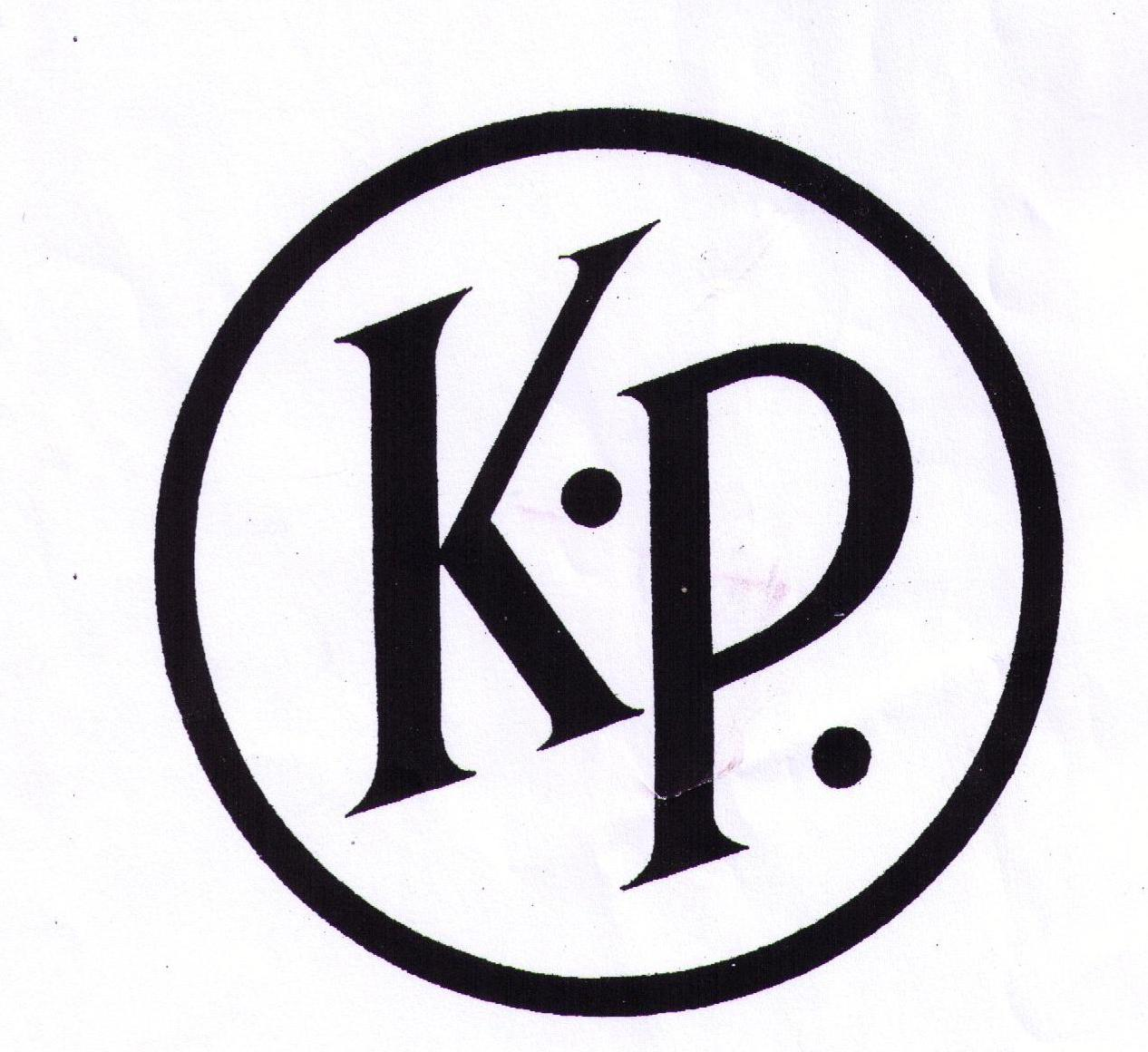
The Kempthorne Prosser logo

Kempthorne Prosser & Co. Ltd, also known as the New Zealand Drug Company Ltd, was the leading drug and fertiliser manufacturer in New Zealand from 1869 until 1978. The company's full name was Kempthorne Prosser & Co.'s New Zealand Drug Co. Ltd, established in the South Island city of Dunedin.

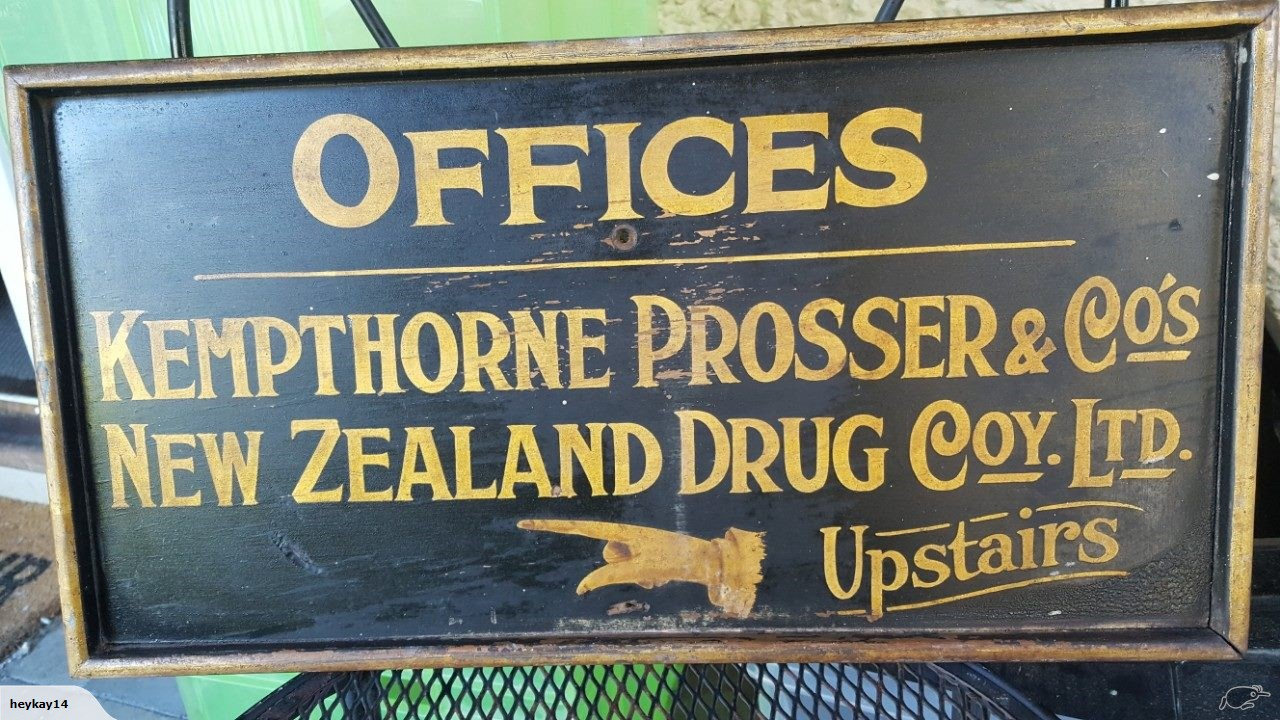
Kempthorne Prosser Office Sign

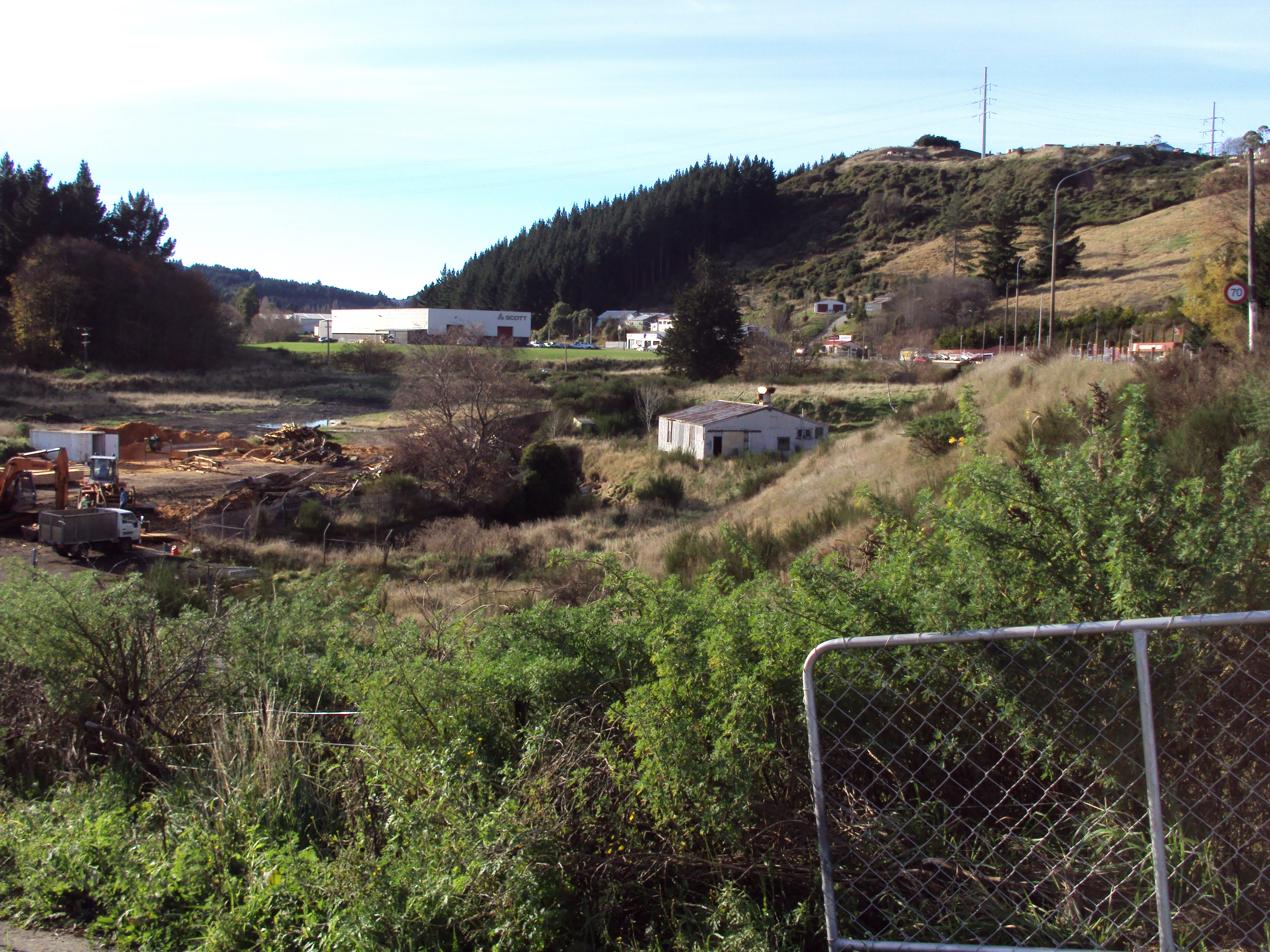
The site of 1881 Kempthorne Prosser Burnside Chemical Works in Dunedin. The last remaining building is pictured at middle right.

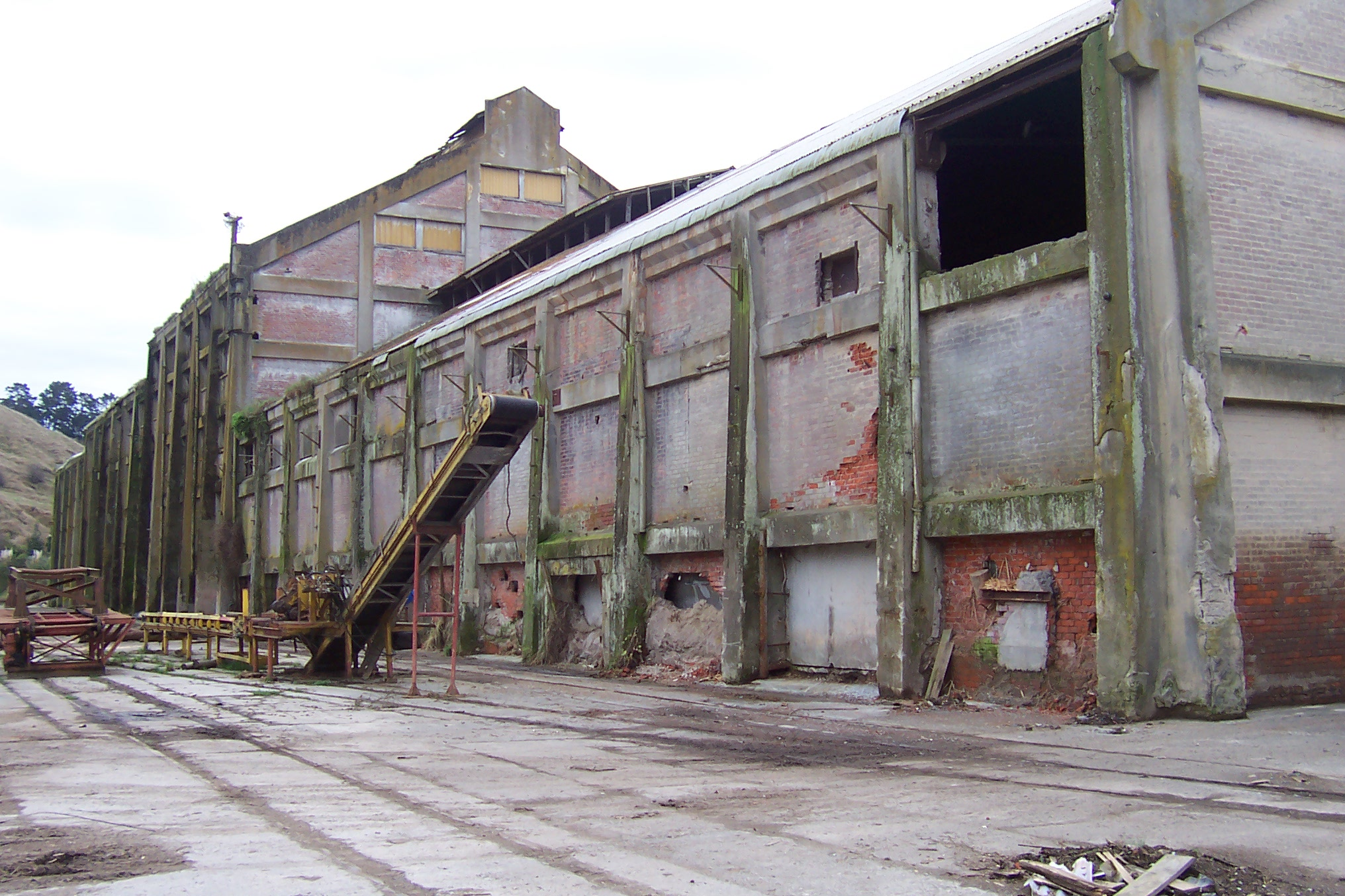
The remains of the Kempthorne Prosser Chemical Works at Aramoho, Wanganui.

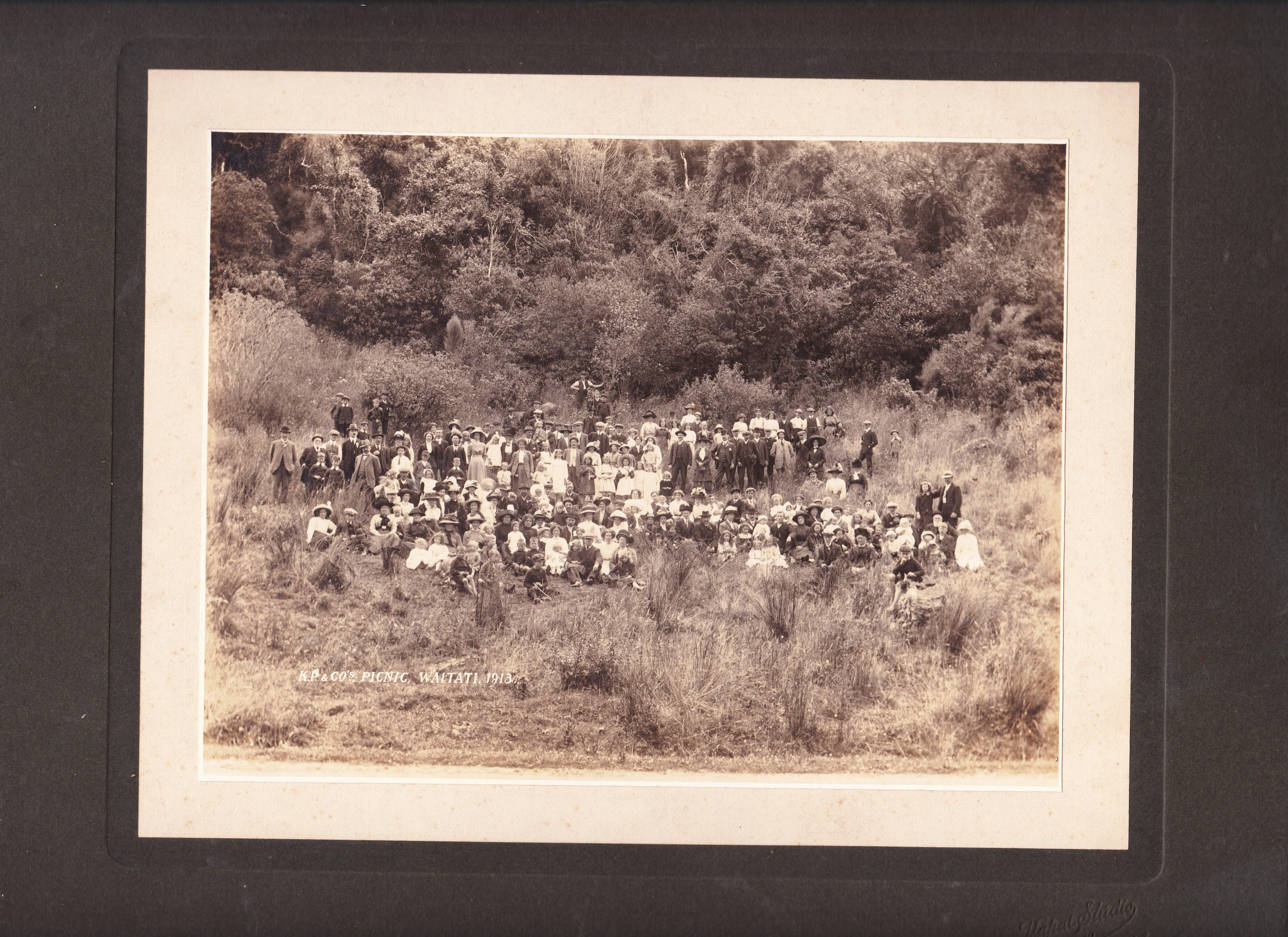
The Kempthorne Prosser staff picnic at Waitati, Dunedin, 1913.

Thomas Whitelock Kempthorne and Evan Prosser entered into business together in 1870 as chemists. They set up Kempthorne Prosser, which became a limited liability company in 1879. The head office was set up on Stafford Street in City Rise, Dunedin. In 1904 Thomas Whitelock Kempthorne retired. Kempthorne Prosser & Co became Kempthorne Prosser & Co. Ltd in 1879 when the New Zealand Drug Company was formed.

== Superphosphate ==
In early 1881, the New Zealand Government offered a bonus for three years to any company that would manufacture 50 tons of sulphuric acid per year. KP's New Zealand Drug Company was the first in the country to combine sulphuric acid and bone dust to produce superphosphate. The Burnside Chemical Works in Dunedin was the first of its type in New Zealand. Kempthorne Prosser constructed further superphosphate plants in Auckland, Christchurch, and Wanganui. From this stemmed a major chemical fertiliser industry, of national importance to the agricultural and pastoral economy. For almost a century 'K. P.' was to dominate the market. Prosser resigned from the company in 1886 and went to Australia before committing suicide.

By the mid-1970s, some New Zealand farmers decided it was time to take control of the fertiliser industry, and established a new company, the Ravensdown Fertiliser Co-operative Ltd. With help from Brierley Investments and producer board funds it acquired Kempthorne Prosser in 1978, and Kempthorne Prosser exited the market. In 2014 there were 25,062 shareholders in Ravensdown and it was New Zealand's leading fertiliser company.

'Ravensdown' as a name comes from the 'Raven', taken from the Ravensbourne site combined with the 'down' taken from the Seadown site.

Ravensdown was described by the High Court, in March 2021, as causing a 'reputational risk' to New Zealand by importing phosphate rock mined illegally in Western Sahara. The imports have attracted criticism that Ravensdown has found difficult to shake off.

Kempthorne Prosser operated four large chemical works. The Burnside, Dunedin Works (1881), Westfield, Auckland (1887), Hornby, Christchurch in 1922 and the Aramoho, Wanganui (Wanganui Chemical) Works in 1926.

== Chemical works and buildings ==
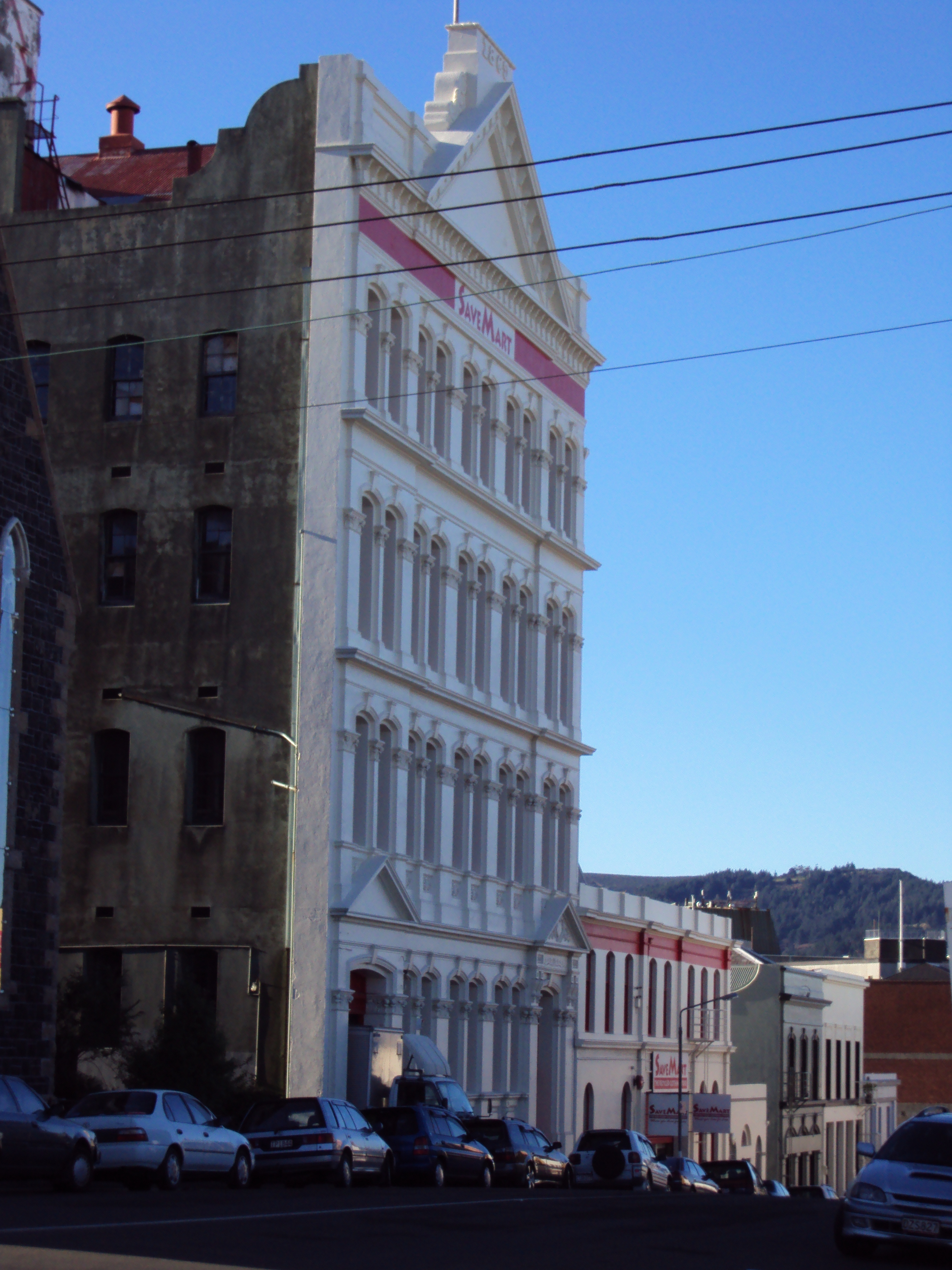
Stafford St Dunedin June 2010. The Kempthorne Prosser labs at far left, then KP warehouse and then chief offices.

In 1870 the firm erected its first premises, on Stafford Street, City Rise, Dunedin. This row of three joint buildings still stand today on the lower reaches of the street, below the SaveMart Building, which was the Kempthorne Prosser laboratory from 1900 until the 1960s. Directly opposite the former laboratories is the office that Kempthorne Prosser occupied during the 1970s, built to replace the earlier structures (31 Stafford Street).

The Burnside Chemical Works in Kaikorai Valley Road, Dunedin was the first Kempthorne Prosser factory to be opened in 1881. It operated until 1962, when it was sold to Dominion Fertiliser Ltd, and has since been demolished, however, one small building which functioned as the Men's Dining room still stands. The second plant, the Westfield Chemical Works in Bell Avenue, Ōtāhuhu, Auckland, operated from 1887. It was partially demolished and converted for new use in the 1990s. The main building still stands.

The Hornby Chemical Works in Hornby, Christchurch, was opened in 1922, and the Wanganui Chemical Works, Brunswick Road, Aramoho, was opened in 1926. Both are still used by Ravensdown Fertiliser.

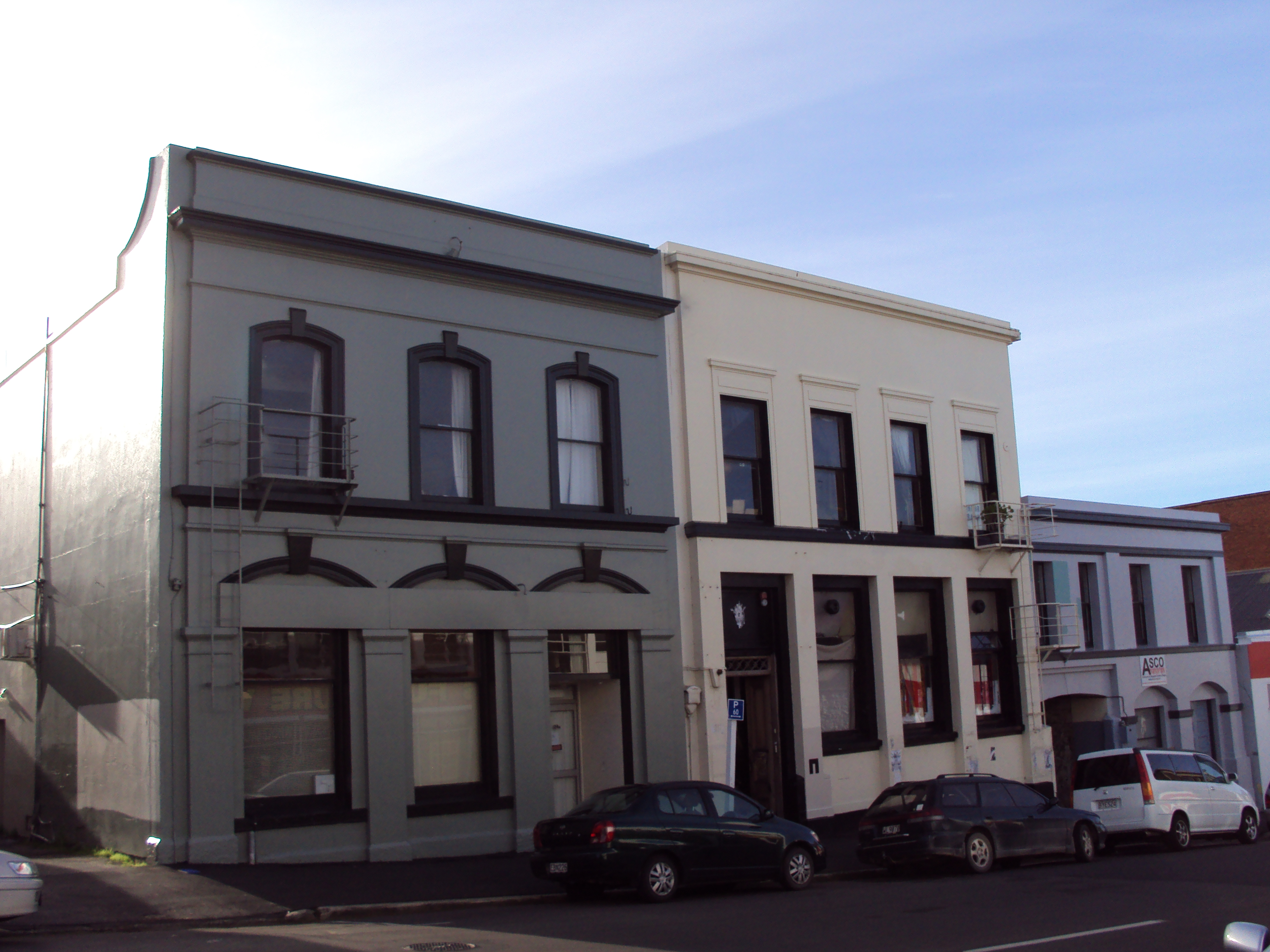
Kempthorne Prosser HQ, Stafford St Dunedin.

Kempthorne Prosser also had non-factory buildings in three main centres. Offices in Albert Street, Auckland, were occupied by the company until 1973 (the building was demolished in 1982). An ornate warehouse on the corner of Willeston and Victoria streets as well as Jervois Quay in Wellington was demolished in 1978 to make way for a Wellington City Council car park building. There were further premises at number 132 High Street, Christchurch. The High St premises were to be demolished in 1987.

== Thomas Whitelock Kempthorne (1834–1915) ==
Thomas Whitelock Kempthorne was born in Cornwall, England. He was the son of John Kempthorne and Anne Whitelock. He was baptised on 3 February 1834. In 1854 he emigrated to Melbourne, Australia. He worked briefly as a labourer digging up tree stumps. In 1855 he found a position in the wholesale drug trade. On 23 June 1859 in Melbourne he married Sarah Inman. They had five daughters and one son before Sarah's death in 1895.

Kempthorne arrived in Dunedin in April 1863, sent by the Melbourne pharmaceutical firm of H. & E. Youngman to look at the prospects of establishing a warehouse there. When the company's managers died Thomas Kempthorne stayed in Dunedin and set up his own drug business, French Kempthorne & Co (after going in partnership with a Mr French). It did not last very long and in 1870 Kempthorne, Prosser & Company was formed when he went into partnership with Evan Prosser, a Welsh chemist on the West Coast. The partnership prospered and in 1879 they set up a limited liability company with capital of £200,000.

He became a prominent figure in the Dunedin business community, remaining managing director of Kempthorne, Prosser & Company until 1904 when he retired.

He gave generous support of St. Paul's Cathedral, Dunedin. He was a member of the board of managers of the Dunedin Technical School (later King Edward Technical College) from 1911 to 1915 and made a donation of £900 towards its new building. On 29 March 1899 in Dunedin he married Annie Charlotte Rawdon Robinson, about 40 years younger than he. They had one daughter and Annie Kempthorne died in 1903 aged 31 years.

In 1901 as the first Dunedin citizen to own a car he created a minor sensation when he was driven along Princes Street in his steam-operated two cylinder Locomobile with one of his company's engineers at the tiller.

New Zealand, he concluded, was 'a land...in which man indeed is blest.' He became unwell at a board meeting of the National Insurance Company and died of a cerebral haemorrhage in Dunedin on 3 November 1915.

== Evan Prosser (1830s–1896) ==
Prosser was elected to the County Council in 1873, and represented the ratepayers of South Ward until the 1st of August, 1875. He was a Welshman by birth, and arrived on the West Coast during the gold rush. Subsequently he removed to Dunedin, where, with Mr. Kempthorne, he formed the nucleus of the since-important firm of Kemptorne, Prosser and Co. Mr. Prosser afterwards retired from the firm and went to Sydney. He was the third Mayor of Hokitika, and held office 1868–1869. He was in business in Hokitika as a chemist and druggist, and subsequently became an original partner of the well known firm of Kempthorne, Prosser and Company, Limited. Mr. Prosser was a member of the first County Council of Westland, and subsequently held a seat on the Provincial Council. He eventually removed to Sydney, where he opened a branch of his firm. It is said that he afterwards made a fortune out of Broken Hill mining speculations.

Mr Prosser operated the Western Drug Hall in Hokitika but sold it in 1870 when Kempthorne Prosser & Co got underway.

Mr Evan Prosser committed suicide at the North Shore, Sydney, on the 20th 1896. The event is thus reported in the Sydney Daily Telegraph: —

A deliberate case of suicide and attempted murder occurred at Neutral Bay shortly after noon yesterday, when Mr. Evan Prosser shot himself at his residence, Raymond-road, and afterwards twice fired at his wife. About 10 minutes after 12 yesterday Mrs. Prosser, having heard the discharge of firearms, immediately ran upstairs, and, going into the bedroom, saw her husband lying on the floor, with blood flowing from under his right ear. She endeavoured to raise him to his feet, but while doing so he pointed a revolver towards her and fired two shots, one of the bullets grazing her neck. She eventually managed to get possession of the revolver, and immediately sent for Dr. Shirlow, who, upon his arrival, ordered the removal of the unfortunate man to the North Shore Hospital, where attempts were made to locate the bullet by Drs. Shirlow, Clarke, and Rorke. When the revolver was handed to the police it was discovered that four of the chambers had been discharged. Mr. Prosser retained his consciousness until he arrived at the institution, when he collapsed, and expired about 4 p.m. Mr. Prosser, who was 60 years of age, was at one time connected with the late firm of Messrs. E. Prosser & Co., wholesale druggists, of Sydney, which business passed into the hands of the Australian Drug Company some years back. The matter was reported to the Coroner, who ordered an inquest.

— Wairarapa Daily Times, August 1896 (originally from Sydney Daily Telegraph),

== Products ==
Some of Kempthorne Prosser's most well known material:

KP/Kempthorne Prosser's products were popular in New Zealand. K.P. Lifesalt was a drink offered in the late 1920s until at least the 1940s when Andrew's Liver Salts gained the market. KP also produced flavouring essences in up to eight different flavours.

KP Rockland and Westfield Manures were celebrated manures produced at the Burnside and Westfield Works in Dunedin and Auckland. From 1881 until about 1920 Kempthorne Prosser held a monopoly in the fertiliser division in the country until competition existed.

KP supplied major chemists and hospitals throughout New Zealand.

== Publications by Kempthorne Prosser ==
- Late 1920s - Profitable Fertilising in New Zealand (1st edition)
- Early 1930s - KP Fertiliser Handbook for New Zealand (2nd edition)
- 1960s - KP Fertiliser Handbook (3rd edition)
- A 24-page history published by the company in 1954 provides a glimpse of the company’s first 75 years.
