= Portage Road, Ōtāhuhu =

Road in the Ōtāhuhu suburb of Auckland, New Zealand

Portage Road
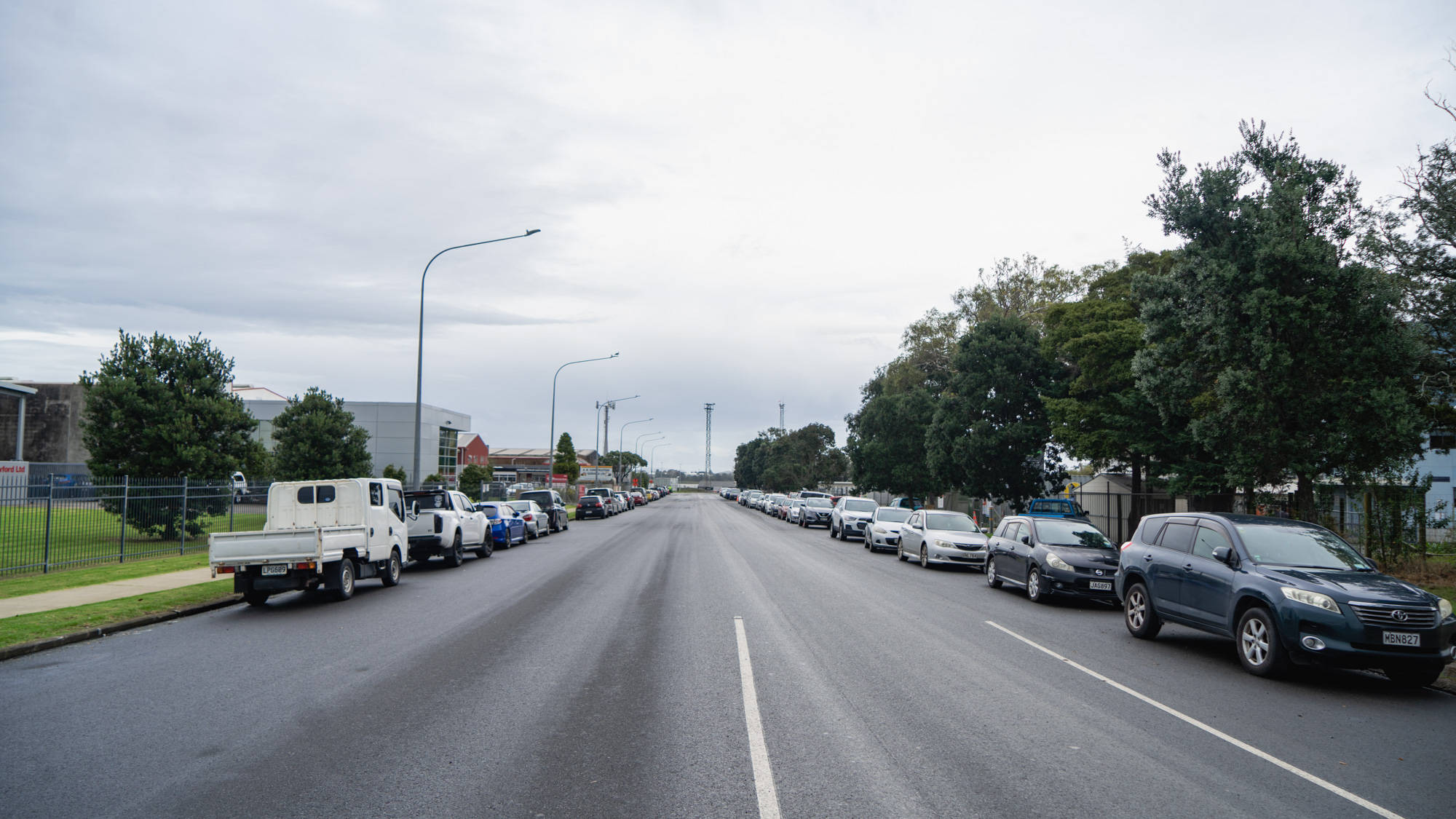
- Portage Road in 2022
- Location: Ōtāhuhu
- Coordinates: 36.9356°S 174.8361°E

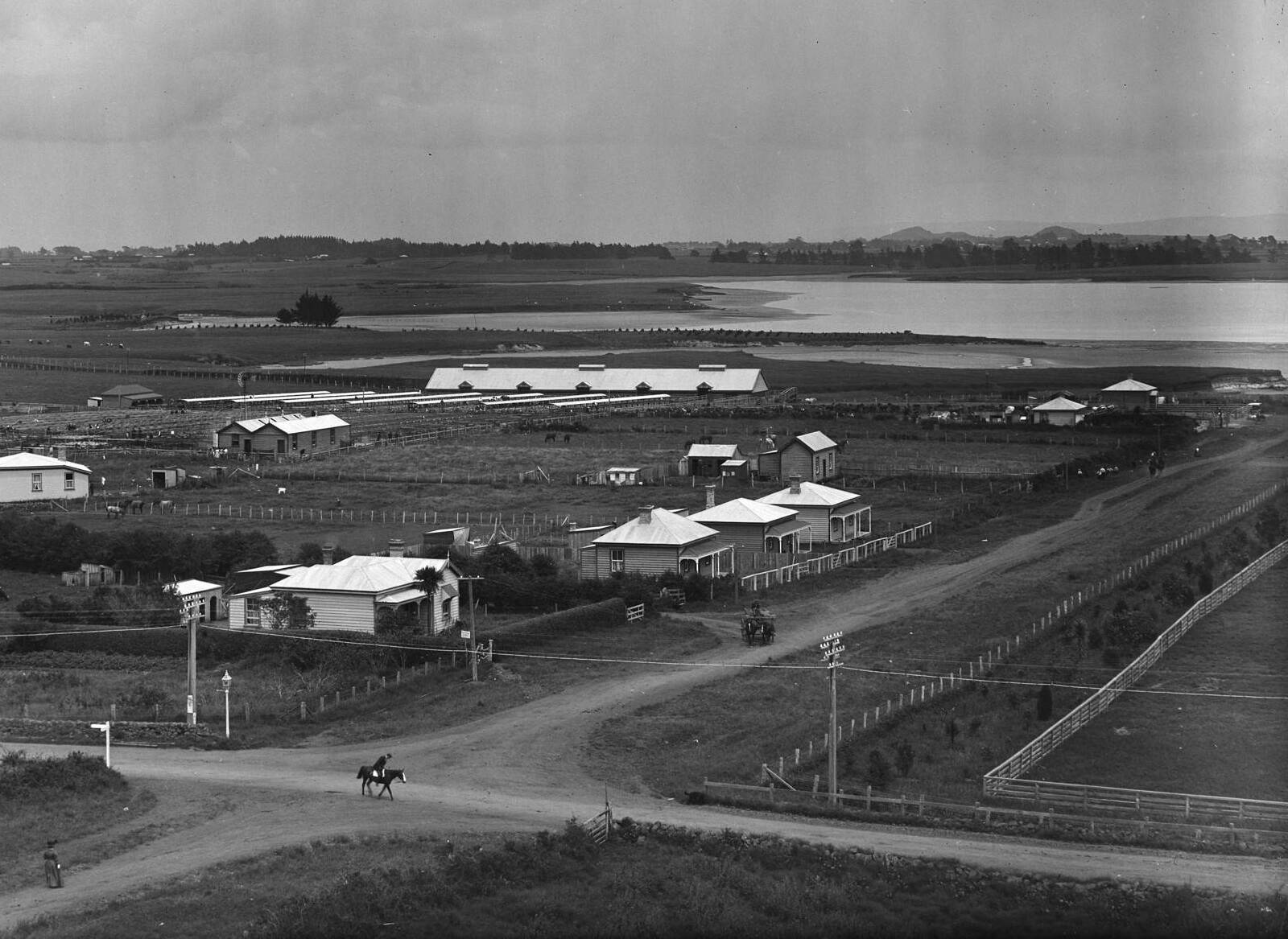
Intersection of Great South Road and Portage Road in 1909

Portage Road in the Ōtāhuhu suburb of Auckland, New Zealand, follows the path of Te Tō Waka, one of the Māori canoe portages between the Tāmaki River (an arm of the Hauraki Gulf) and the Manukau Harbour, which facilitated access between the eastern and western sides of the North Island. The history of the site is described in plaques that are embedded in concrete plinths at the intersection of Portage Road and Great South Road and Atkinson Avenue. The road marked the northernmost boundary of the Borough of Otahuhu until it was absorbed into the new Tamaki City.

== Plaque on Portage Road ==
An historic plaque can be found on Portage Road. The plaque is inscribed as follows:

This Plaque Marks a Historic Site: In the middle of the 14th century, the Maori First Fleet invaded Aotearoa and, sailing through Hauraki Gulf, visited Tamaki in search of a new home. The first canoe to reach the isthmus was the "Tainui" which stayed at Otahuhu while the Maori Chief Taikehu carried out reconnaissance from a hill top, probably Mount Richmond. The waters of the Manukau Harbour were seen and the canoe was dragged overland and went on her way, calling at Mokau and finally then to her last resting place at Kawhia. In later years, canoes were frequently taken across the portage at Otahuhu, and this practice was followed with boats and small vessels even in Pakeha times. Later a canal was planned to link the Tasman and Pacific Oceans, and land was reserved to that end. Today the old track is known as Portage Road. Half a mile in length, it must surely be the shortest road between two seas anywhere in the world.
This plaque, donated by W.A. Stevenson. Esq., and Mrs. M.J. Sparrow was unveiled on March 20th 1959 by J.D. Murdoch. Esq., Mayor of Otahuhu.
