= Epsom, New Zealand =

Epsom
- Suburb
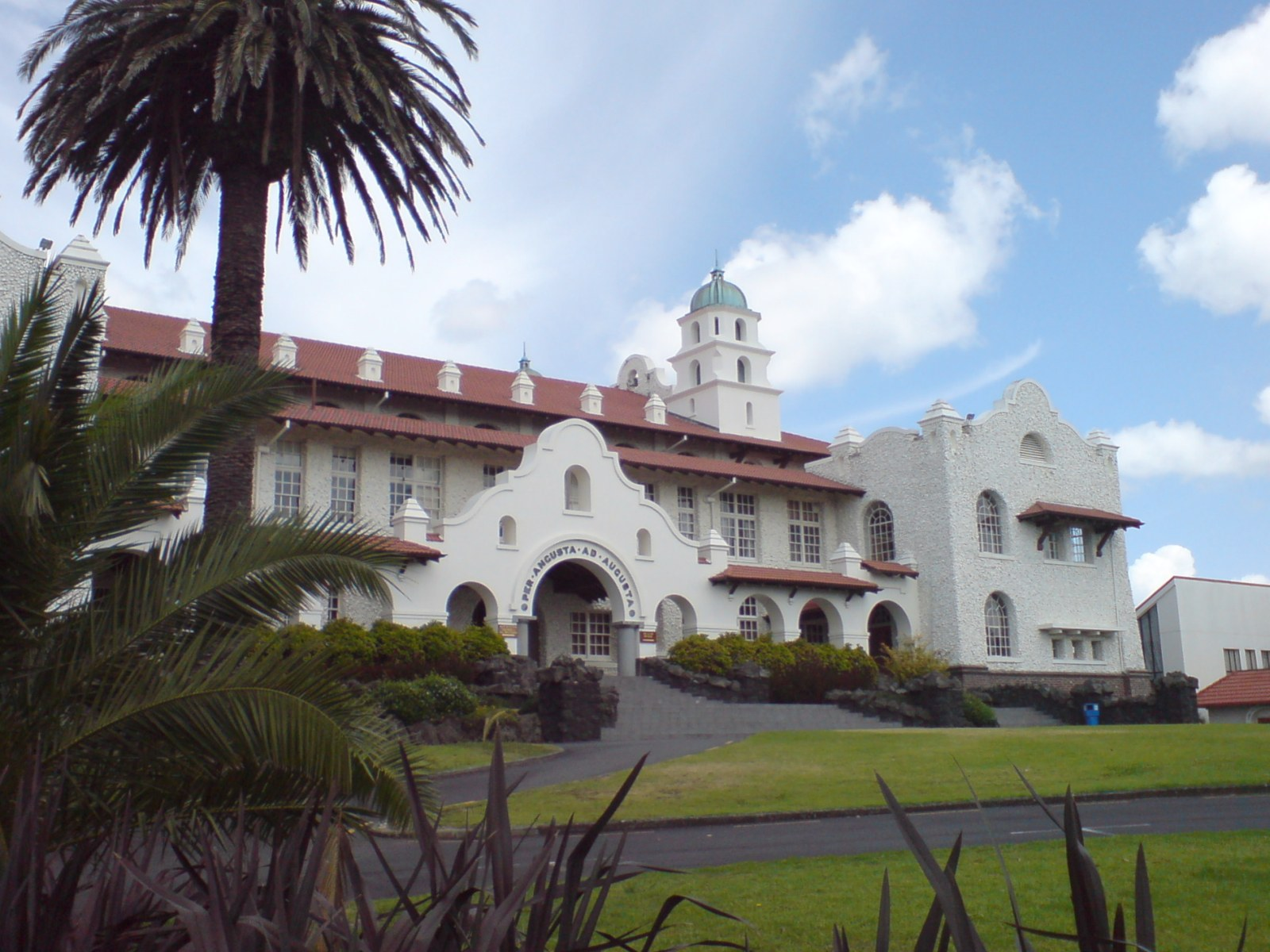
- Auckland Grammar School, a prominent secondary school in Epsom
- Interactive map of Epsom
- Coordinates: 36.8892°S 174.7665°E
- Country: New Zealand
- City: Auckland
- Local authority: Auckland Council
- Electoral ward: Albert-Eden-Puketāpapa ward
- Local board: Albert-Eden Local Board; Puketāpapa Local Board

Area
  - Land: 627 ha (1,550 acres)

Population (June 2025)
  - Total: 20,530
  - Density: 3,270/km^{2} (8,480/sq mi)

Eden Terrace	Newmarket	Remuera
Mount Eden	Epsom	Remuera
Three Kings	Royal Oak	One Tree Hill, Greenlane

Epsom is a suburb of Auckland, New Zealand. It is located in the centre of the Auckland isthmus between Mount Eden and Greenlane, south of Newmarket, and 5 km (3.1 mi) south of the Auckland City Centre.

A valley located between four volcanic hills, Epsom was settled by Tāmaki Māori likely in the 13th or 14th centuries, becoming an are cultivated for Māori gardens due to the fertile volcanic soil. By the 17th and 18th centuries, Epsom was close to the centre of Waiohua, an influential union of Tāmaki Māori tribes, who focused life at Maungawhau / Mount Eden and Maungakiekie / One Tree Hill. Around the year 1741, conflict between iwi led to the area becoming a part of the rohe of Ngāti Whātua.

After the establishment of Auckland, Ngāti Whātua sold 8,000 acres (3,200 ha) of land to the Crown, on which the village of Epsom was established in 1841. Epsom developed into an agricultural area during the 1840s and 1850s, and by the 1860s upper class members of Auckland society began establishing large country homes at Epsom. In 1903, a tramway was established in the suburb, and commercial villages developed in Epsom. By the 1920s, most of Epsom had been converted from farmland into suburban housing. From 1930 to 1989, eastern Epsom was the One Tree Hill Borough, a local government area independent from the City of Auckland.

Major features of the Epsom area include Cornwall Park, Greenlane Clinical Centre and Alexandra Park.

== Geography and definition ==
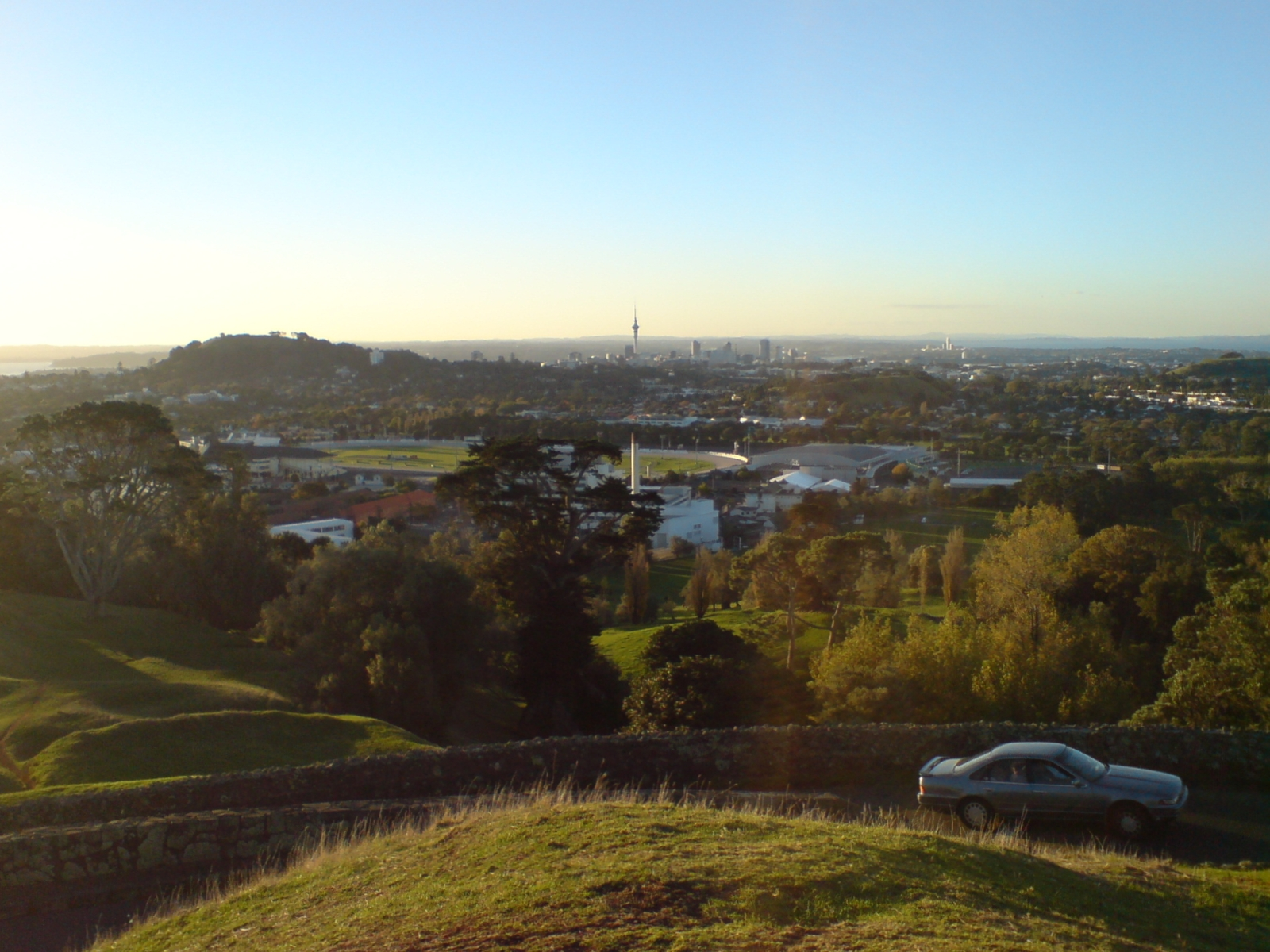
Epsom is a valley located between four volcanic hills on the Auckland isthmus

Epsom is an inland suburb in the central Auckland isthmus. While the suburb has no concrete landmarks that differentiate Epsom from surrounding areas, Epsom is primarily a valley enclosed by four volcanoes of the Auckland volcanic field: Maungawhau / Mount Eden to the northwest, Tītīkōpuke / Mount Saint John to the northeast, Maungakiekie / One Tree Hill to the southeast and Te Tātua a Riukiuta / Three Kings to the southwest. Prior to European settlement, the Epsom valley was the location of numerous streams which flowed northwards towards the Waitematā Harbour. Since the 1960s, the corner of Manukau Road and Great South Road has popularly been understood as the beginning of Epsom.

Epsom is located between the suburbs of Mount Eden to the west, Newmarket to the north. Remuera to the east, and Three Kings to the southwest. The suburbs of One Tree Hill and Greenlane are found to the southeast, with Royal Oak to the south. Major arterial roads in Epsom include Manukau Road, which bisects the suburb and connects Newmarket to Royal Oak, Great South Road, a major road to the east of the suburb which links Newmarket to South Auckland, and Greenlane, a major east-west road across the isthmus. The Auckland Southern Motorway and Southern Line are located east of Epsom.

Greenwoods Corner is a small commercial village in southern Epsom, located at the crossroads of Manukau Road and Pah Road.

== Etymology ==
The first references in newspapers to the Village of Epsom come from September 1841, when the first sections of land were sold at auction. The name was likely chosen to reference the Epsom Downs Racecourse in Surrey, England, famous for the Epsom Derby, as Epsom was chosen as one of the first locations where horse racing was held in New Zealand. The first races were advertised in September 1841, and held in November of the same year. Typically Robert Wynyard, superintendent of the Auckland Province, is identified as the person who chose the name Epsom, although this may be apocryphal.

While no traditional Tāmaki Māori names appear to refer to the Epsom valley, some traditional names include Te Rua-a-Rangi ("The Pit of Rangi"), located at the Great South Road and Manukau Road intersection, Te Punga-a-Rangi ("The Spring of Rangi"), located near the Mount Saint John Avenue and Manukau Road intersection, and Ngā Ana-peka-rau ("The Cave of Many Bats"), located near Windmill Park.

== Natural history ==
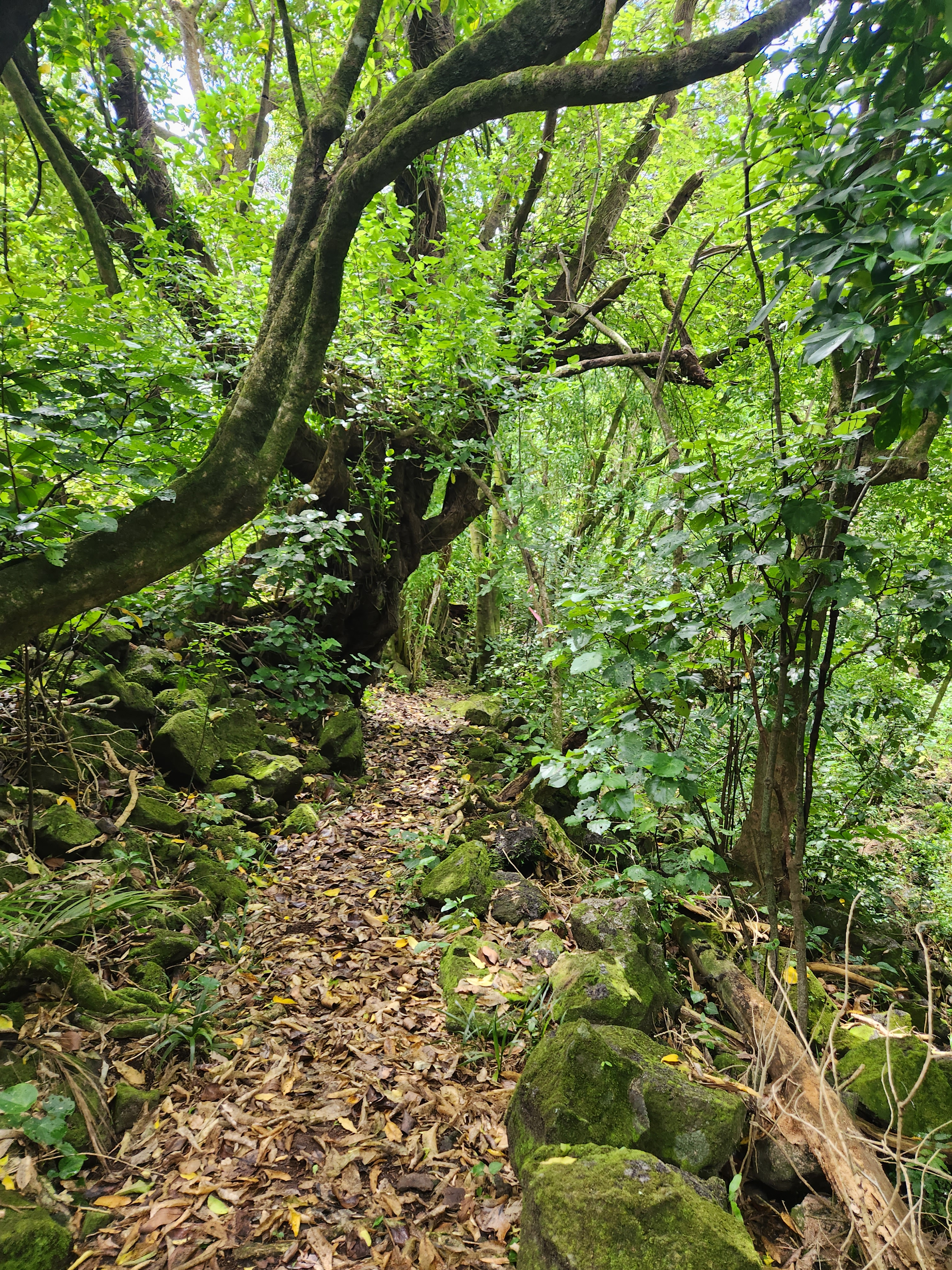
The Almorah Rock Forest is a rare biome in the Auckland Region, formed in low-soil areas on the volcanic rock deposits of Maungawhau / Mount Eden. Currently only 25 hectares (62 acres) of rock forest remain

The Epsom area is primarily formed by volcanic soil modified into agricultural pasture, lying on top of Waitemata Group sandstone. Tītīkōpuke / Mount Saint John and Maungakiekie / One Tree Hill are the oldest of the Epsom area volcanoes, which are estimated to have erupted approximately 75,000 years and 67,000 years ago respectively. Te Tātua a Riukiuta / Three Kings last erupted an estimated 31,000 years ago. The youngest volcano in the Epsom area is Maungawhau / Mount Eden, which is estimated to have last erupted 28,000 years ago. To the southeast of Maungawhau / Mount Eden was Te Pou Hawaiki, a small scoria cone located at the modern-day site of the Auckland College of Education, which was quarried away. While there is no known estimate for how old Te Pou Hawaiki is, it is known to have erupted earlier than Maungawhau / Mount Eden.

The Epsom area is home to numerous lava caves, created by the eruptions of the five known volcanoes. Northern Epsom is the location of one of the rarest ecosystems in New Zealand, the Almorah Rock Forest. A soil-poor forest biome that developed on top of Maungawhau / Mount Eden scoria, the forest has reduced in size from 5,000 hectares (12,000 acres) to 25 hectares (62 acres) during human settlement of the Auckland isthmus.

== History ==
=== Māori history ===
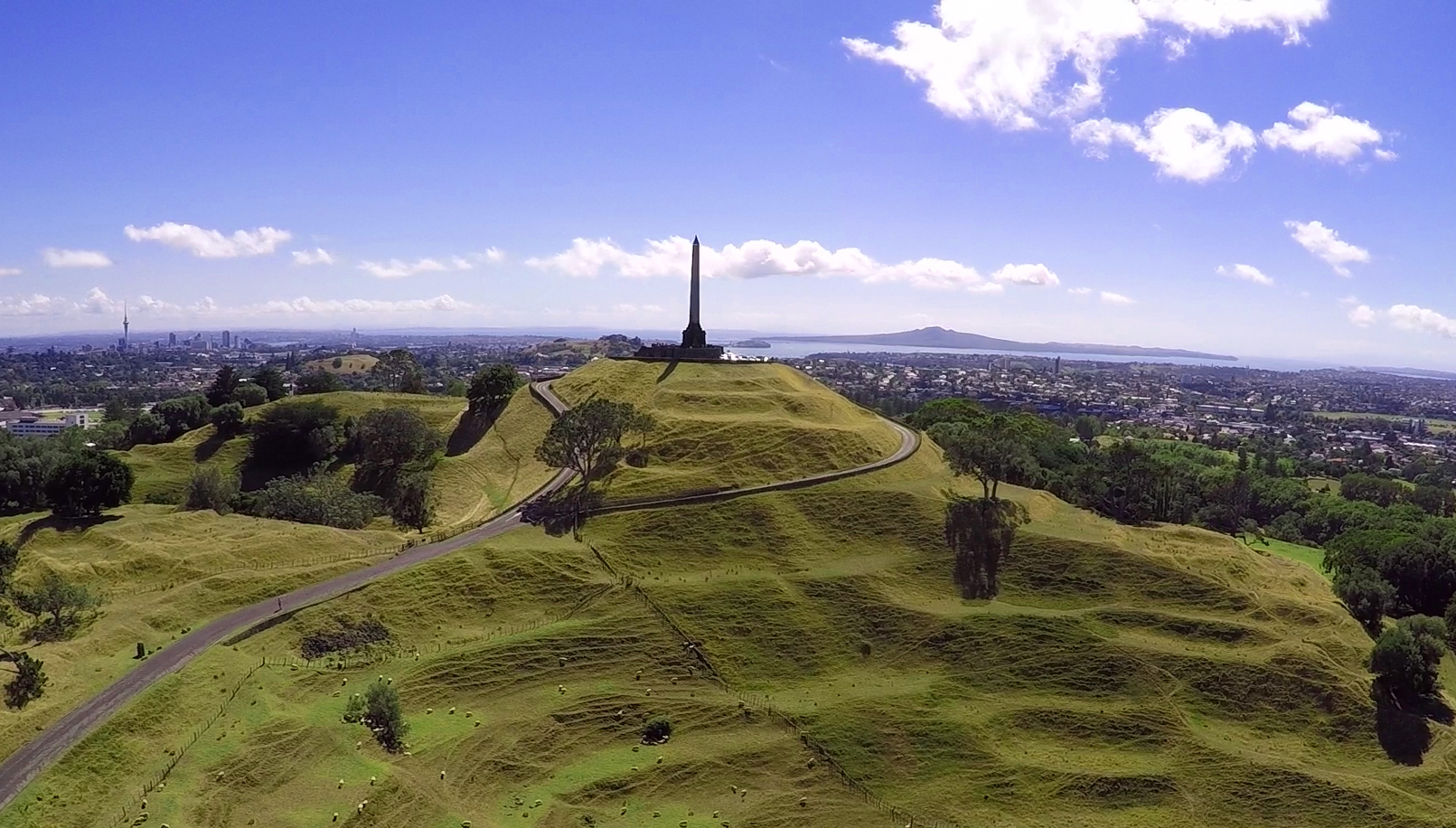
Maungakiekie / One Tree Hill was a major settlement and terraced pā site, important to the Waiohua union of Tāmaki Māori in the 17th and 18th centuries

The Auckland isthmus has been settled by Māori since around the 13th or 14th centuries. The Epsom valley was likely an early sites of Māori agriculture. The wider area was devoted to the shifting cultivation of crops, primarily kūmara (sweet potato). The volcanic peaks of Maungawhau / Mount Eden, Maungakiekie / One Tree Hill, Tītīkōpuke / Mount Saint John were likely first settled around 1400AD, and an overland walking track (ara) was created between the Waitematā and Manukau harbours, which later became Manukau Road.

Te Pou Hawaiki (a volcanic crater at the Auckland College of Education campus) was a traditionally important location, where a small pā known as Ōwhatihue was located. Soil from Hawaiki (the Māori homeland) was placed at the site during the early settlement period, and rituals were performed here prior to major hunting and fishing expeditions. A path known as Aratakihaere ("The Path of Single File") led between Maungawhau / Mount Eden and Te Pou Hawaiki. Additionally, Melville Park is a site where large stones had been placed by Tāmaki Māori.

In the 17th century, chief Hua Kaiwaka consolidated tribes on the isthmus as a confederation called Waiohua, a union which lasted for three generations until the early 18th century. During this period, thousands of people lived at fortified pā complexes on Maungawhau / Mount Eden and Maungakiekie / One Tree Hill,

The Te Taoū hapū of Ngāti Whātua defeated Kiwi Tāmaki, the paramount chief of Waiohua circa 1741, at a battle at Paruroa (Big Muddy Creek) in the lower Waitākere Ranges, under the leadership of Tuperiri. After Waiohua were defeated in a series of battles, some members of Te Taoū settled at Tāmaki Makaurau and intermarried with Waiohua, later becoming known as Ngāti Whātua Ōrākei. During this period, former agricultural areas on the isthmus began reforesting, due to the relatively smaller population of Ngāti Whātua Ōrākei, and Ngāti Whātua remained at Maungakiekie / One Tree Hill until the death of Tuperiri, around the year 1795.

Early contact with Europeans caused influenza outbreaks among Tāmaki Māori in 1793 and 1810. In late 1821 during the Musket Wars, a Ngāpuhi taua (war party) led by Hongi Hika attacked the Auckland isthmus settlements, leading to a period of time when the isthmus was mostly deserted, and Tāmaki Māori of the isthmus sheltered primarily to the south with Waikato Tainui relatives. Ngāti Whātua returned to the isthmus by the mid-1830s, resettling in the Māngere Bridge-Onehunga area.

=== Early colonial period ===
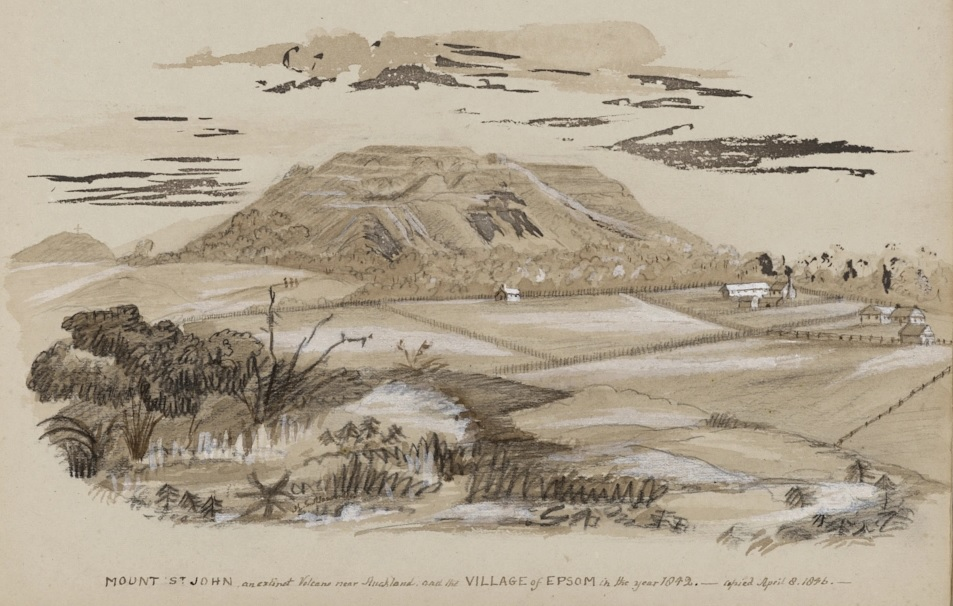
Pencil sketch of Epsom and Mount Saint John in 1842

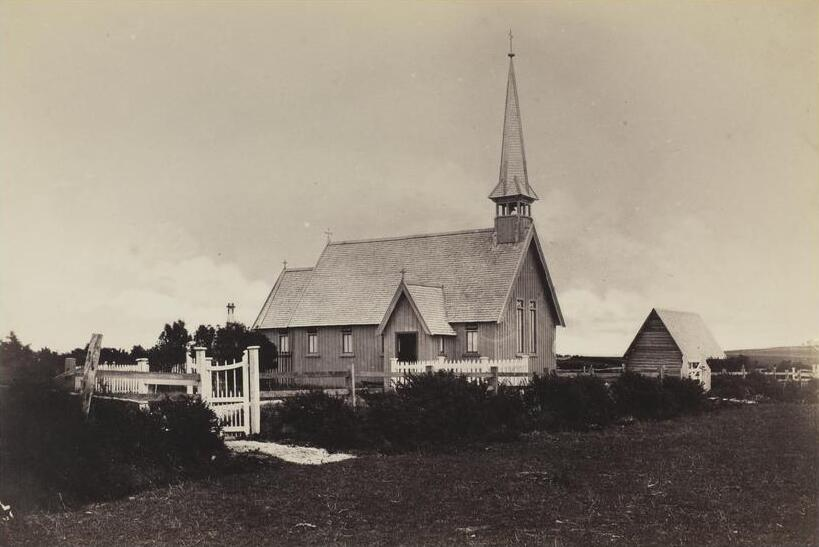
St Andrews Church was established in 1846 and rebuilt in 1868

In 1840 after the signing of the Treaty of Waitangi, paramount chief Apihai Te Kawau made a tuku (strategic gift) of land at Waihorotiu on the Waitematā Harbour to William Hobson, the first Governor of New Zealand, as a location for the capital of the colony to develop. This location became the modern city of Auckland, beginning with a port develop around Commercial Bay. In mid-1840, Apihai Te Kawau relocated the majority of the Ngāti Whātua from the Manukau Harbour to Remuera-Ōrākei on the Waitematā Harbour, closer to the new settlement of Auckland. Dual ports were created on either side of the isthmus the Port of Auckland on the Waitematā Harbour to the north of Epsom, and the Port of Onehunga on the Manukau Harbour, to the south.

In June 1841, the Crown purchased an additional 8,000 acres (3,200 ha) of land south of Auckland from Apihai Te Kawau, much of which became the modern suburb of Epsom. The first farms in Epsom were subdivided and sold at auction in September 1841. As the first farms had been established later in that year, Epsom became one of the first European farming areas in New Zealand, and was quickly associated with horse racing events held on William Potter's land in the vicinity of modern-day Alexandra Park. In addition to the Village of Epsom, more villages were established by property developers, including Kingsdown, Windsor, Anna and Maytown; although none of these became permanent names used by residents. The population of Epsom grew from 51 people in 1842 to 222 people in 1845.

Epsom struggled to grow as a community in the 1840s and 1850s, due to land speculators. Despite the volcanic soil of the area leading to productive farms, profits from subdividing and on selling the land without settling it often outweighed the cost and effort of establishing working farms. Early land owners of farms in the area included George Graham, William Potter, William Greenwood (namesake of Greenwoods Corner) and James Dilworth. Early farms grew crops such as wheat, oats, flax and barley. By the 1850s, wheat had become unprofitable, leading to the growth in potatoes as a crop, an areas being redeveloped for livestock, including cattle, sheep, horses, pigs and poultry.

Around the year 1843, a windmill was constructed in Epsom at the corner of Windmill Road and St Andrews road. The windmill primarily milled wheat, and Māori regularly brought corn to be milled at the windmill. As the windmill became less profitable the owners struggled financially, and resorted to taking Tāmaki Māori human remains from lava caves on Maungawhau / Mount Eden, and grinding these to make bone fertiliser. During the Invasion of the Waikato in the early 1860s, the Epsom windmill was converted into a defensive post for the surrounding area.

In 1846, the first church in the area, St Andrews, was constructed in Epsom. The Anglican church was later rebuilt in 1868.

=== Upper class rural community ===
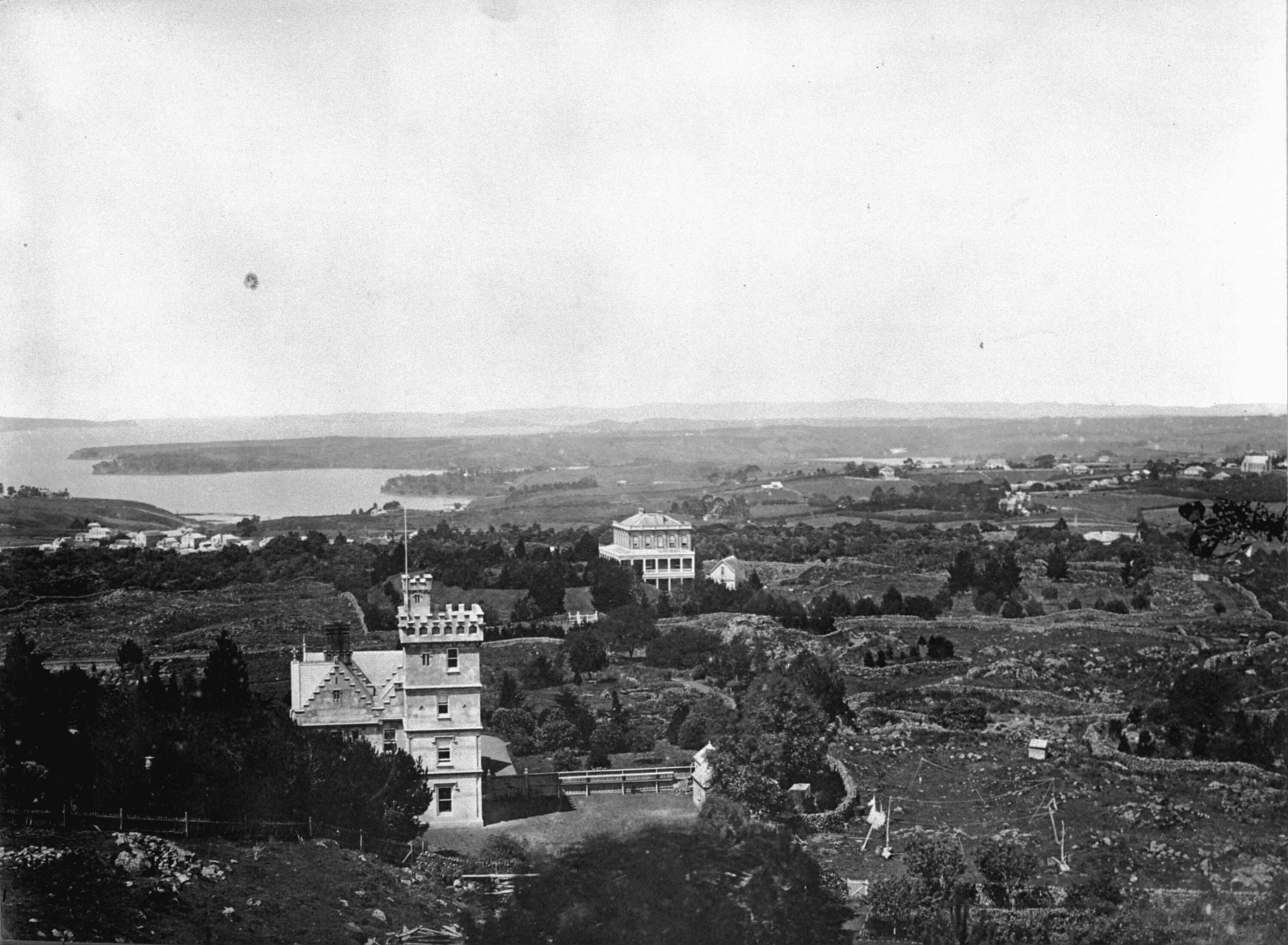
View from Maungawhau / Mount Eden in the late 1870s, showing the establishment of large houses, such as Clifton House (bottom left)

By the 1860s, Epsom and Remuera had grown to become locations where upper class families of Auckland built country manors and large houses. Major figures who lived on properties at Epsom during this period included Thomas Gillies, Edwin Hesketh, David Murdoch, John Benjamin Russell, and John Logan Campbell. the latter of whom had an extensive farm on the northern slopes of Maungakiekie. Tensions existed between the farmers of Epsom and its upper class residents, many of whom complained about agricultural odours and practices.

Compared to surrounding areas close to Auckland, Epsom residents resisted urbanisation. Amenities arrived much later in Epsom than other areas close to Auckland: the post office only being established in 1877, Manukau Road upgrades occurring in 1882, gas street lighting in 1882 and the first school only opening in 1885. By the 1890s, Chinese market gardeners began leasing land in Epsom, the first of whom was Ming Quong, who leased 22 acres (8.9 ha) from John Logan Campbell in 1892, establishing market gardens at the modern-day site of the Cornwall Cricket Club.

In 1890, the Costley Home for the Aged Poor was established at the modern-day site of Greenlane Clinical Centre.

In 1901, the Duke and Duchess of Cornwall (King George V and Queen Mary of Teck) held a tour of New Zealand. During this visit, the Epsom Race Course was renamed Alexandra Park in honour of the Queen, Alexandra of Denmark, and Cornwall Park was formally opened, named after the Duke and Duchess. Cornwall Park was the former property of John Logan Campbell, who donated the lands to the City of Auckland.

=== Epsom trams and suburbanisation ===
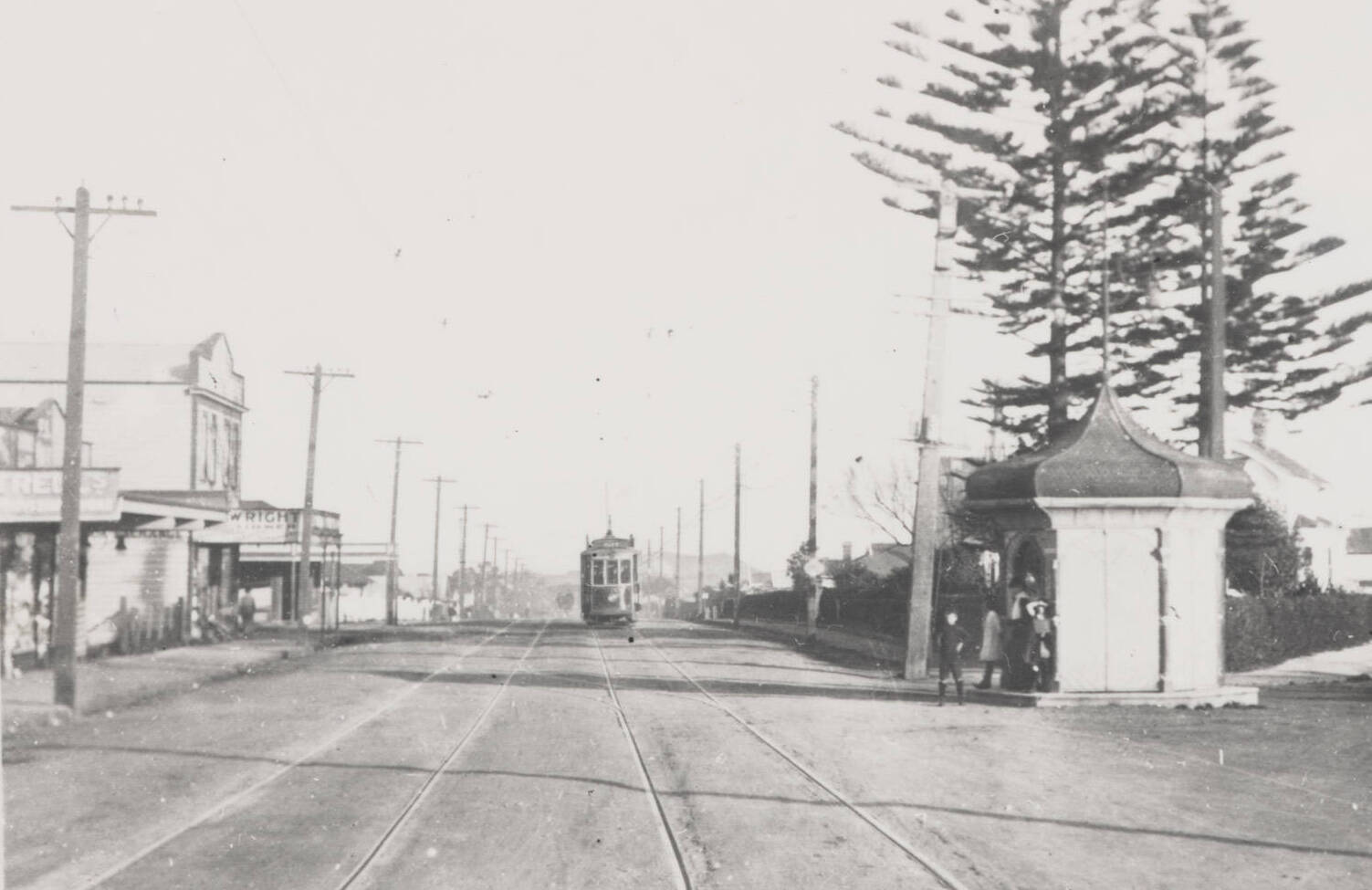
People waiting for the tram on Manukau Road at Greenwoods Corner (photograph taken between 1903 and 1919)

The Epsom area gradually suburbanised in the 1900s and 1910s. In 1903, a tramway was established in Epsom, connecting Auckland City to Onehunga via Manukau Road, replacing the horse-drawn services that had been established along this route in 1888, and quickly becoming the major public transport used in the Epsom area. Two shopping villages developed in Epsom around the tram stops: the intersection of Greenlane and Manukau, and Greenwoods Corner.

The Epsom Showgrounds were first used to the Auckland agricultural show in 1911, later becoming a major venue for events in the 1910s. During World War I, Alexandra Park became the side of the Epsom Military Camp, where many soldiers were trained before deployment.

In 1923, a second tram route was established along Great South Road, leading to a third commercial centre in Epsom, at the intersection of Ranfurly Road and Great South Road.

The Ambury milk treatment factory was opened in Epsom in 1924. While the factory continued to operate until the early 1980s, the last farms in Epsom disappeared during the 1920s or early 1930s.

By the 1920s, Chinese-operated businesses began operating on Manukau Road, including laundries and greengrocers. Circa 1932, the first Indian greengrocer began operating in Epsom, when Gujarat immigrant Parbhu Kashanji began working at a store owned by his relative Naranji Daya.

Small industrial factories began operating in the Epsom area from the 1920s onwards. Frederick Porter's Dye Works moved premises to Market Road in 1927, and the Swiss Laloli brothers established children's furniture making business on Manukau Road in 1939. In 1941, the En-Ta Toys factory was established at Greenwoods Corner. Epsom residents often complained about the manufacturing odours, and the factory caught on fire twice in the 1940s. After the second fire, the Auckland City Council refused to allow the factory to be rebuilt.

=== World War II ===
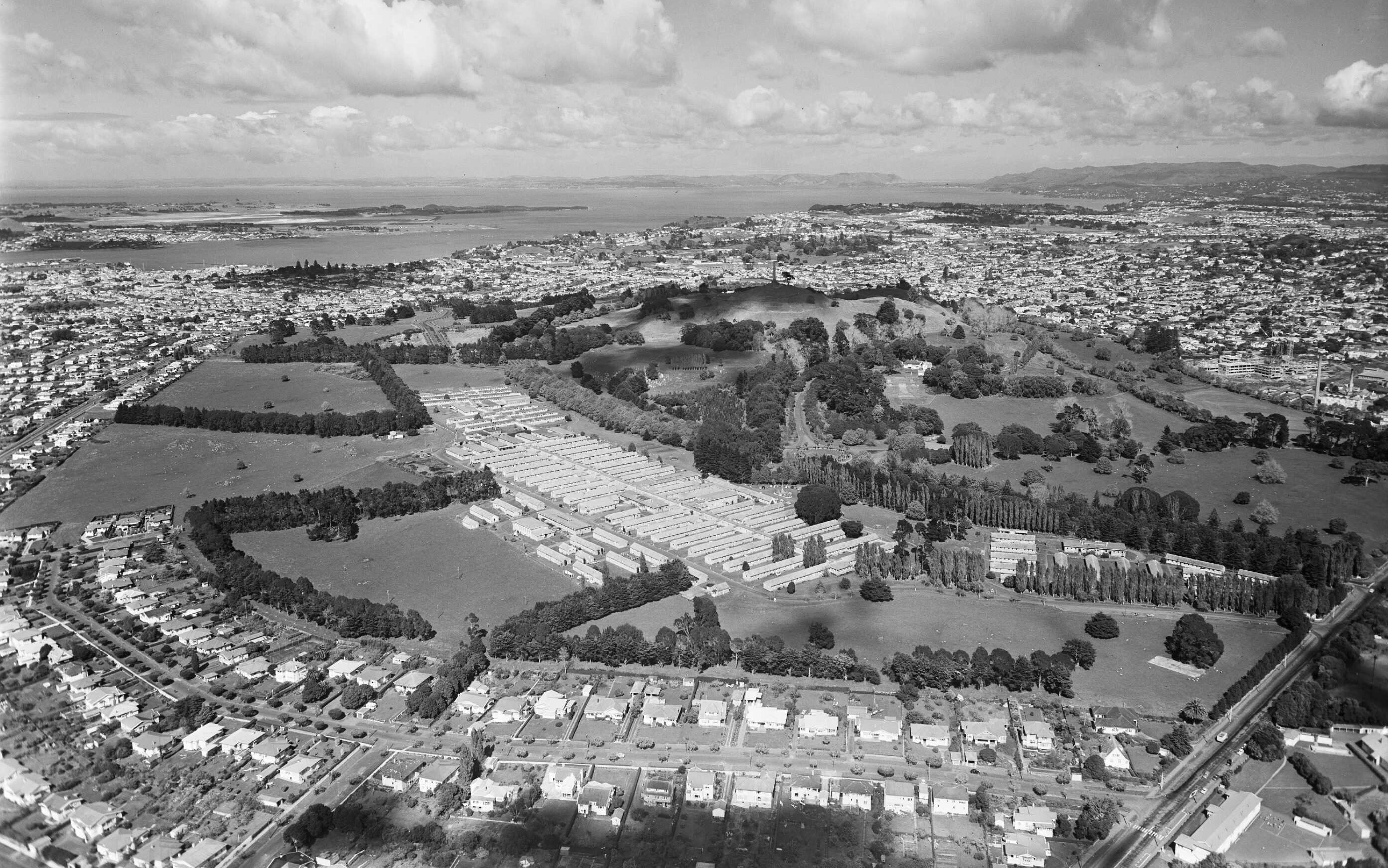
Cornwall Hospital (since demolished) was established in northern Cornwall Park in 1943 for United States Army servicemen during World War II

During World War II, two companies of the New Zealand Home Guard were based in the Epsom area: the One Tree Hill A Company and Epsom Company Home Guard. Training exercises were held at the One Tree Hill domain by the Epsom Company Home Guard. In 1942, the Auckland Teachers Training College was requisitioned by the government, and used as an operational quarters for the military, and a bunker was constructed at the site to protect the operations centre in the event of an attack.

In 1942, the former Costley Home for the Aged Poor (renamed the Auckland Infirmary in 1924) was redeveloped as Green Lane Hospital, due to increased pressure at Auckland City Hospital during the war. Additionally, the United States Army constructed Cornwall Hospital to the north of Cornwall Park in 1943, to provide treatment for American soldiers injured in the Pacific War. Closing the following year, the hospital operated until 1975 as a maternity and geriatric hospital.

=== Epsom in the 20th and 21st centuries ===
The Mater Misericordiae Hospital opened in 1900 in Mountain Rd. Run by the Sisters of Mercy it was a private Catholic hospital but took patients of all denominations. In 1988 it changed its name to the Mercy Hospital becoming Allevia Hospital Epsom in 2025.

The Epsom windmill was demolished in 1953. In 1956, the tram service along Manukau Road was closed down, replaced by trolleybuses.

In 1957, the Beth Shalom progressive Jewish synagogue was established on Manukau Road. Te Unga Waka Marae, a Catholic urban marae, was established on Manukau Road in 1966 by Whina Cooper and her nephew Pa Matiu.

In 1966, the Newmarket Viaduct of the Auckland Southern Motorway was constructed, marking the beginning of a gradually developing motorway system to the east of Epsom that linked the Auckland City Centre to South Auckland.

During the 1980s, the predominantly European demographics of Epsom began changing, as Asian communities settled in the suburb. Since the early 1990s there has been a considerable amount of "infill" housing with clutches of townhouses altering the streetscapes in some parts of Epsom. Properties in Epsom are often significantly more expensive compared to similar houses, due to Epsom being inside the school zones of many prestigious schools in central Auckland.

== Demographics ==
Epsom covers 6.27 km^{2} (2.42 sq mi) and had an estimated population of 20,530 as of June 2025, with a population density of 3,274 people per km^{2}.

Historical population
Year	Pop.	±% p.a.
2006	18,105	—
2013	19,392	+0.99%
2018	19,425	+0.03%
2023	19,338	−0.09%

Epsom had a population of 19,338 in the 2023 New Zealand census, a decrease of 87 people (−0.4%) since the 2018 census, and a decrease of 54 people (−0.3%) since the 2013 census. There were 9,189 males, 10,071 females and 78 people of other genders in 6,240 dwellings. 4.5% of people identified as LGBTIQ+. The median age was 38.4 years (compared with 38.1 years nationally). There were 2,676 people (13.8%) aged under 15 years, 4,914 (25.4%) aged 15 to 29, 8,634 (44.6%) aged 30 to 64, and 3,114 (16.1%) aged 65 or older.

People could identify as more than one ethnicity. The results were 44.0% European (Pākehā); 5.4% Māori; 4.0% Pasifika; 51.4% Asian; 2.8% Middle Eastern, Latin American and African New Zealanders (MELAA); and 1.3% other, which includes people giving their ethnicity as "New Zealander". English was spoken by 91.4%, Māori language by 1.3%, Samoan by 0.6%, and other languages by 43.1%. No language could be spoken by 1.4% (e.g. too young to talk). New Zealand Sign Language was known by 0.3%. The percentage of people born overseas was 50.6, compared with 28.8% nationally.

Religious affiliations were 28.3% Christian, 5.8% Hindu, 2.7% Islam, 0.2% Māori religious beliefs, 3.7% Buddhist, 0.3% New Age, 0.3% Jewish, and 1.6% other religions. People who answered that they had no religion were 52.0%, and 5.4% of people did not answer the census question.

Of those at least 15 years old, 8,016 (48.1%) people had a bachelor's or higher degree, 5,304 (31.8%) had a post-high school certificate or diploma, and 3,333 (20.0%) people exclusively held high school qualifications. The median income was $45,700, compared with $41,500 nationally. 3,039 people (18.2%) earned over $100,000 compared to 12.1% nationally. The employment status of those at least 15 was that 8,226 (49.4%) people were employed full-time, 2,316 (13.9%) were part-time, and 408 (2.4%) were unemployed.

Individual statistical areas
Name	Area (km^{2})	Population	Density (per km^{2})	Dwellings	Median age	Median income
Epsom North	1.08	3,219	2,981	1,044	37.6 years	$44,100
Epsom Central-North	1.11	3,591	3,235	1,128	38.8 years	$39,900
Mount St John	1.24	3,552	2,865	1,038	38.0 years	$36,700
Epsom Central-South	0.98	3,870	3,949	1,185	36.5 years	$49,600
Epsom East	1.27	2,802	2,206	1,029	40.4 years	$53,200
Epsom South	0.60	2,304	3,840	813	39.4 years	$53,000
New Zealand					38.1 years	$41,500

== Notable features ==
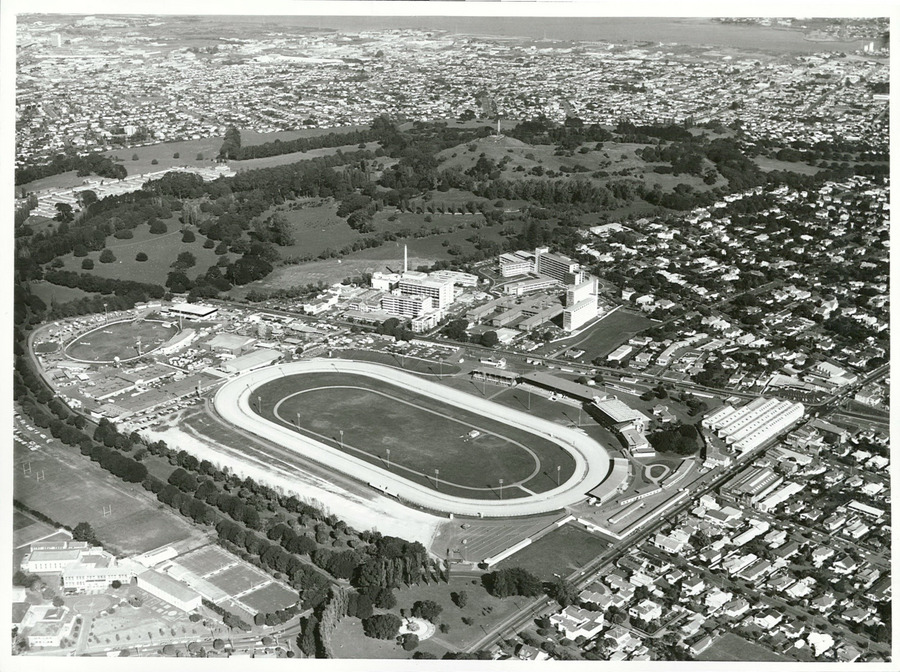
Aerial view of Alexandra Park and Cornwall Park in 1973

The Alexandra Park Raceway lies in the south-eastern quarter of Epsom where it is located next to the Epsom Showgrounds. The broad, flat pastureland here at the intersection of Green Lane West and Manukau Roads was used for sporting events from the 1850s onwards but the two venues were only formally established around 1900. The Alexandra Raceway was named after the Princess of Wales later Queen Alexandra. The Epsom Showgrounds host the annual Auckland Royal Easter Show.

The major road running through Epsom is Manukau Road. Manukau Road links central Auckland on the east coast with its airport and its west coast harbour, the port of neighbouring Onehunga. It was one of the 19th century's main routes south from Auckland. The main route was Great South Road which forms Epsom's north-eastern boundary with Remuera. The link to the Port of Onehunga meant Manukau Road became the route for horse buses, horse trams and, after 1902, electric trams. A large number of suburban houses and villas were built along it.

Several large residences were built in Epsom's open country during the mid to late 19th century surrounded by large estates and smaller working farms. As these were subdivided towards the end of the 19th century the landscape changed dramatically. One major landowner, Dr John Logan Campbell, gave a large portion of his estate to the city and that is now Cornwall Park.

Epsom's most notable parks and reserves are the volcanic cone of Mount Saint John and Marivare Reserve at the intersection of Manukau and Ranfurly Roads with a War Memorial in the form of an arch made of Volcanic rock together with sports grounds Melville Park and Windmill Park. As well as reserves located in Epsom itself the suburb is ringed with public parks often given to the city by Epsom residents.

To the west is Mt Eden with the Mount Eden Domain. To the east is Cornwall Park and One Tree Hill Domain.

== Notable buildings ==
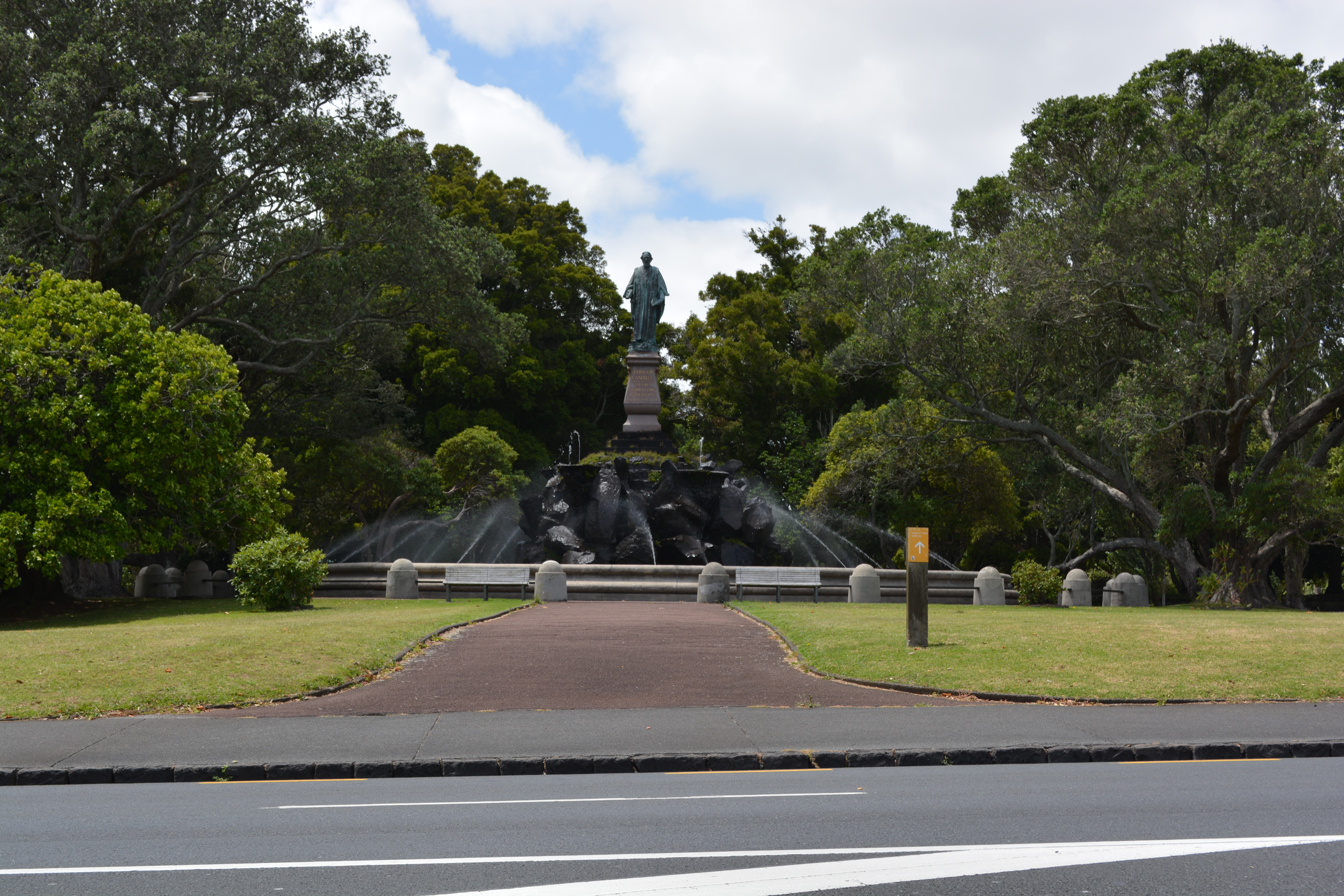
Campbell Memorial Fountain and Statue

- St Andrews Church – St Andrews Road. Wooden 19th-century Anglican church in the Selwyn style. Dr Purchas was vicar here. Once the centre of a rural parish this church is attended by a graveyard of significant age and importance. Little of the 1846, or 1867 churches remain, but the church has had a Category 1 listing since 1989.
- Dilworth Chapel – Great South Road. Modernist chapel for a prominent boys' school.
- Rocklands Hall – 187 Gillies Avenue. A grand country residence in the French Second Empire Style designed by Auckland architect John Currie (1849–1919). The home of Thomas Bannatyne Gillies who was a farmer, lawyer, politician, judge and naturalist. He arrived in Dunedin in 1852 and served in the provincial and national parliaments during the 1860s, being elected speaker of the Otago chamber in 1861. He moved to Auckland in 1865 where he recommenced his political career; he served as Superintendent (1869–73) and as a MHR, serving briefly as colonial treasurer in 1872. He also became a Supreme Court Judge. the house was built around 1865–66, with the major addition of a ballroom in 1889. This was once a centre for hunting on Horseback when the surrounding area was largely open farmland and scrub covered countryside. Now a student hostel for the adjacent teachers' college.
- Te Unga Waka Marae – corner Clyde Street and Manukau Road.
- Epsom Library – Manukau Road. 1990s building which replaced an earlier building from 1917 built for the Epsom Road Board.
- Liberal Jewish Synagogue – Manukau Road. Modernist building from the 1950s by John Goldwater. This is one of the two Synagogues in Auckland.
- Vasanta School – Margot Street. Two storied wooden Victorian House with a turret, used by the Theosophical Society as a school.
- Marivare – Ranfurly Road. A large 19th-century country house from around 1862 built for Henry Ellis (1828–1879). Ellis was elected to the Provincial Council in 1869. He later worked as an immigration agent and subsequently as the Immigration Officer for Auckland before becoming a Wesleyan minister in mid-life. The residence was purchased by prominent Auckland lawyer and businessman John Russell in the early 1880s and renamed Marivare. Following Russell’s death in 1894, Marivare was purchased by his eldest daughter Ada Carr. Now surrounded by suburban housing – the Carr family donated the last part of the estate to the city as a War Memorial – the Marivare Reserve.
- Former One Tree Hill Borough Council Building – Manukau Road near Ranfurly Road.
- St Cuthbert's College – Market Road. 1920s Classical building for a private girls' school.
- Epsom Post Office – Manukau Road. Arts & crafts building by the office of John Campbell from around the time of the First World War. Brick, stucco and Marsailles tile building of a type typically created by the Ministry of Works to harmonise with suburban houses.
- Campbell Memorial Fountain and Statue – Located at the Manukau Road entrance to Cornwall Park is a baroque fountain commemorating Sir John Logan Campbell. It is made of a massive pile of basalt rocks surmounted by a red granite pedestal and an over life-sized bronze statue. The sculptor, Henry Alfred Pegram (1862–1937), was based in London and worked from photographs to achieve a likeness. On discovering that the completed statue would be mounted on such a large base he increased the scale of the statue. The statue was finally unveiled on Empire Day, 24 May 1906.
- Former Tram Company Building – Greenlane. Office block built after the Electric Tram System was created in 1902 – Epsom is halfway between Auckland and Onehunga and so was a convenient place to locate the large Tram Sheds. These Sheds were demolished in the late 1970s and replaced by office buildings. The former Office block survives as a restaurant.
- Lido Cinema – Manukau Road at Greenlane. Neo-Greek building from the 1920s.
- Alexandra Park Raceway Gates – Greenlane Road. Brick, stucco and Marsailles tile lodges with wrought iron gates dating from the early 1920s.
- 1905 Totaliser Building – Alexandra Park Raceway. This is a wooden structure from the early 20th century. One of the oldest surviving items on this site.
- Our Lady of the Sacred Heart – Banff Avenue. Roman Catholic Church with adjacent school.

== Education ==
Auckland Grammar School and Epsom Girls Grammar School are single-sex state secondary schools (years 9-13) with rolls of 2,767 and 2,316 respectively.

Dilworth School, Diocesan School for Girls and St Cuthbert's College are single-sex private composite schools (years 1-13) with rolls of 506, 1,725 and 1,643 respectively.

Epsom Normal Primary School is a contributing state primary school (years 1-6) with a roll of 611. Kohia Terrace School is a full state primary school (years 1-8) with a roll of 367. Our Lady of the Sacred Heart School is a state-integrated Catholic school (years 1-8) with a roll of 209. These schools are all coeducational.

Rolls are as of July 2026.

Due to the phenomenon of the "Grammar Zone", parents wishing to live in-zone for Auckland Grammar and Epsom Girls' Grammar, housing in Epsom has become desirable and expensive. Houses within the Grammar Zone come with a premium of at least NZ$100,000 compared with an identical house just outside the Grammar Zone.

The University of Auckland Faculty of Education (formerly known as the Auckland College of Education) campus is also situated at this district.

As a branch of Auckland Libraries, Epsom Library is located on Manukau Road, one of the main roads of the Epsom suburb.

Carlson Cerebral Palsy School was founded in 1954, by the Auckland Education Board. They provided special schooling for children with cerebral palsy. The school was named after Dr. Earl Carlson who lived with cerebral palsy and visited New Zealand in 1948, where he educated the government on the condition and advocating for a space for students aged 3-18 years to obtain an education. The school celebrated its sixtieth jubilee in 2024.

== Politics ==
=== Local government ===
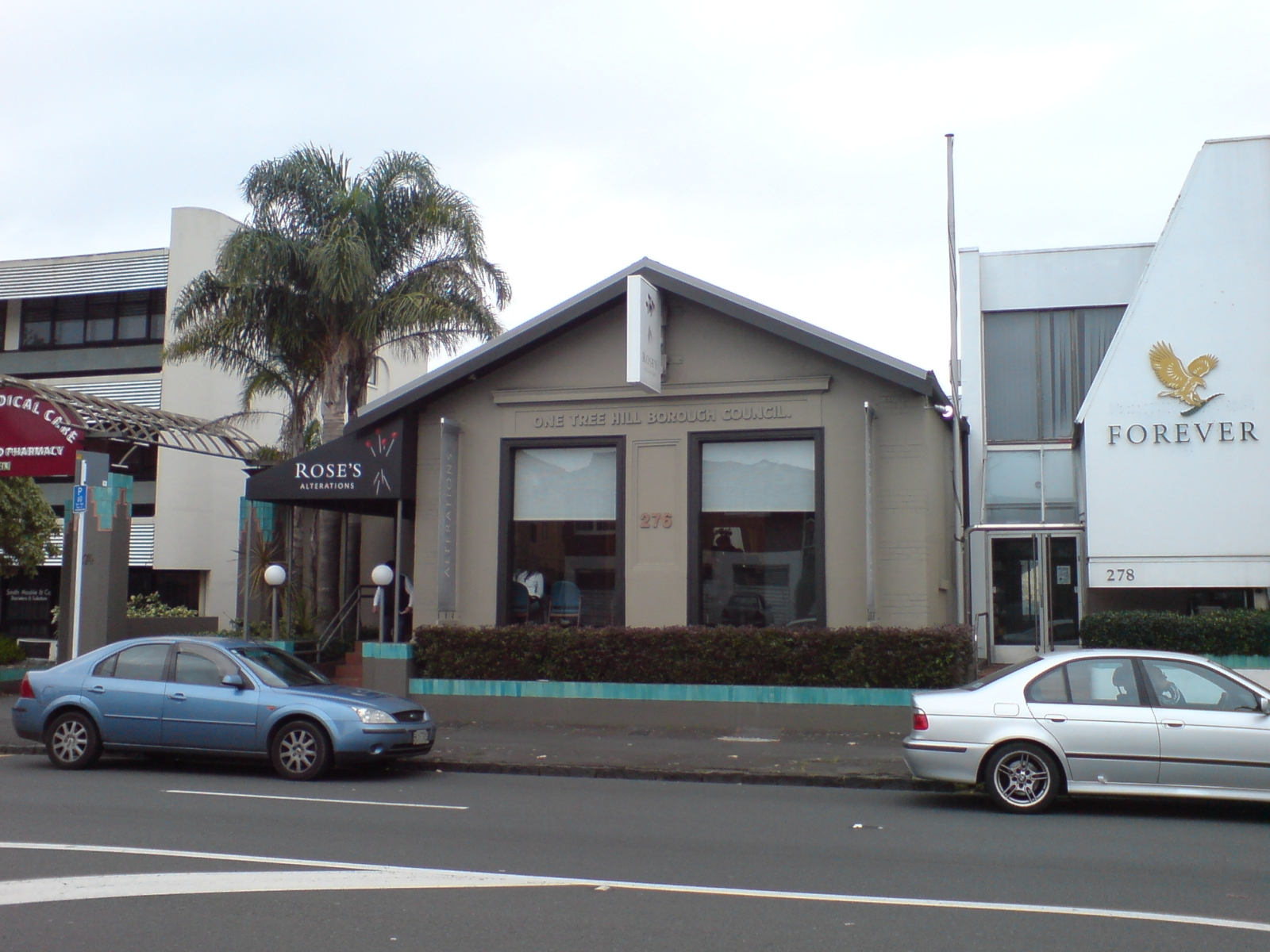
The former One Tree Hill Borough offices, located on Manukau Road in Epsom

The first local government in the area were highway and road board, which were established in the 1860s and 1870s. The Epsom Road Board operated from 1875 to 1917 around the Manukau Road area, but due to the late establishment of the board, many of the areas of modern Epsom were already part of the surrounding Newmarket, Mt Eden and One Tree Hill road boards. For much of its existence, the board met at the Newmarket Borough Council offices.

On 1 February 1917 the Epsom Road Board was dissolved, and the area was absorbed into Auckland City. In 1930, the area east of Manukau Road split from Auckland City to form the One Tree Hill Borough, while the area to the west remained under the control of the City of Auckland. In 1989, the One Tree Hill Borough was amalgamated into Auckland City. On 1 November 2010, the Auckland Council was formed as a unitary authority governing the entire Auckland Region, and most of Epsom become a part of the Albert-Eden local board area, administered by the Albert-Eden Local Board.

The Albert-Eden and Puketāpapa local board areas form the Albert-Eden-Puketāpapa ward, which votes for two members of the Auckland Council.

==== Mayors ====
The One Tree Hill Borough had eight mayors during its existence:

	Name	Term of office	
1	Joseph Speight Hardwicke	1930	1931
2	Israel Goldstine	1931	1947
3	Brian Preston Stevenson	1947	1956
4	Francis William Laidlaw Milne	1956	1968
5	Walter Adolph Race	1968	1971
6	Leonard Jack Harley	1971	1971
7	Harold Cooper Sadgrove	1971	1974
8	Jack Dickey	1974	1989

=== National government ===
Epsom is also the name of an electorate that includes Epsom, Remuera, Parnell, Broadway Park, and part of Balmoral. Former Auckland Mayor Christine Fletcher, was elected as Member of Parliament for Epsom in 1996. This electorate as of 2005 is the wealthiest in the country, with an average income well above the national average.

The Epsom electorate has historically been a centre-right seat and, up until 2005, was considered a 'safe' seat for the National Party. In 2005 the electorate elected the ACT candidate Rodney Hide, and the party has held the seat since then, in part to National softly endorsing the ACT candidates in the electorate in order for National to gain a list seat from the electorate.

The seat is currently held by David Seymour of the ACT Party. The suburb of Epsom comprises roughly 20% of the population of the Epsom electorate.

== Notable residents ==
- Dr Arthur Guyon Purchas (1821–1906) – clergyman, surgeon, musician; the first vicar of St Andrew's Church
- Justice Thomas Bannatyne Gillies (1828–1889) – Supreme Court judge; lived in a house called 'Rocklands Hall' on Gillies Avenue
- George Burgoyne Owens – lived in a house called 'Brightside'
- Josiah Firth – rebuilt his house 'Clifton' as a concrete castle known as Firth's Castle
- Hellaby Family – lived in a house called 'Florence Court'
- Cleghorn Family – Victoria Cleghorn, the daughter of Archibald Scott Cleghorn, was an heir apparent of the Hawaiian royal family
- James Dilworth – he and his wife left their house and property as Dilworth School
- Sir Frank Mappin and Lady Mappin – donated their home 'Birchlands' as Government House, Auckland
- King of Tonga – the Auckland residence of the Tongan monarch is called ʻAtalanga and is at 183 St Andrews Road. It was bought by Queen Sālote for Tongan scholarship students in 1952 and sold in 2010.
- Christopher Luxon – current Prime Minister of New Zealand

== Bibliography ==
- Bush, Graham W. A. (2006). The History of Epsom. Auckland: Epsom & Eden District Historical Society Inc. ISBN 0-473-11102-0.
- Mackintosh, Lucy (2021). Shifting Grounds: Deep Histories of Tāmaki Makaurau Auckland. Bridget Williams Books. doi:10.7810/9781988587332. ISBN 978-1-988587-33-2.
- Stone, R. C. J. (2001). From Tamaki-makau-rau to Auckland. Auckland University Press. ISBN 1869402596.
