= Greenwoods Corner =

Coordinates: 36.89999°S 174.77309°E

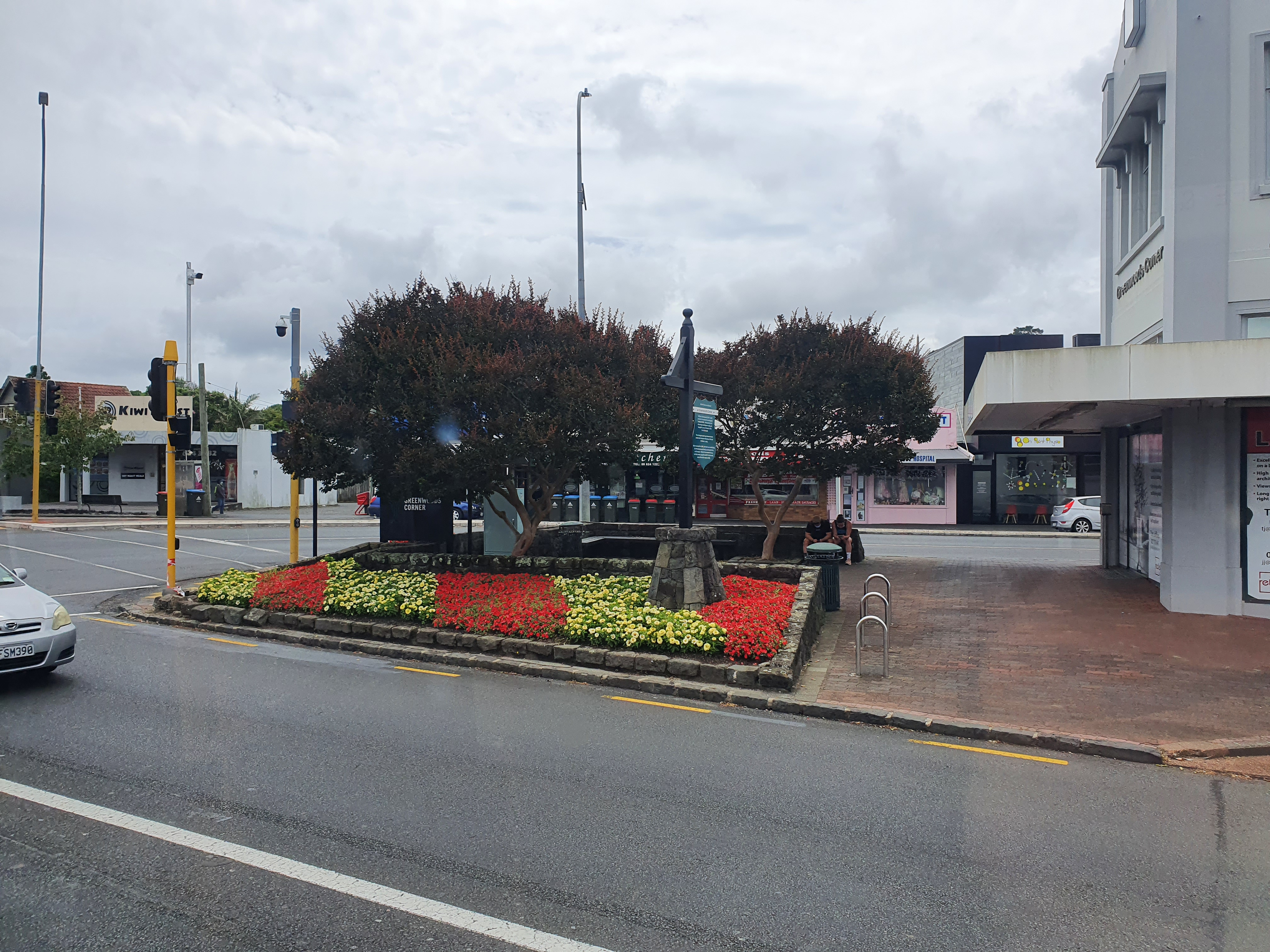
Greenwoods Corner and the former building of the Auckland Savings Bank (right)

Greenwoods Corner is an Auckland neighbourhood located at the intersection of Pah Road and Manukau Road. Greenwoods Corner is named after the original family that lived in the area for over a century. Following the sale of the property Greenwoods Corner developed into a commercial and service area.

Greenwoods Corner shopping village is made up of a collection of small enterprises: restaurants, cafés, and retail businesses.

== History ==
Greenwoods Corner was named after an early English landowner, Mr William Greenwood, who purchased the six acres that became Greenwoods Corner for 43 pounds, 5 shillings, and 8 pence in 1842. Greenwood built a homestead on a triangular section and sold the remaining land to a syndicate for a subdivision in 1909. The Greenwood family kept the homestead for 110 years, a significant period of time considering Auckland's short history as a city. Greenwoods Corner later became a service and shopping area.

During its early development Greenwoods Corner was defined by Manukau Road on the east, Pah Road on the west, and Mount Albert Road at its base (south). Southern Epsom was rural at the time of the first homestead of Greenwoods Corner and was characterized by green fields and grazing cattle. Originally two Norfolk pines framed the Greenwood Homestead at the triangle in the road, as defining features of the community. Both the pines and the homestead were pulled down by the city for a road widening and improvement scheme in 1954 and the Auckland Savings Bank now stands in the homestead's place.

=== Politics ===
Prior to the 1989 local government reforms Greenwoods Corner fell between three local authorities: the City of Auckland, Mount Roskill Borough, and One Tree Hill Borough.

Greenwoods Corner falls within the Maungakiekie constituency for the Parliament. In terms of local government, Greenwoods Corner comes under the Albert-Eden Local Board, of Auckland Council. The Albert-Eden Local Board includes the suburbs of Waterview, Point Chevalier, Sandringham, Mount Albert, Morningside, Owairaka, Balmoral, Kingsland, Mount Eden, Epsom and Greenlane.

Greenwoods Corner community sign, placed at the crossroads of Manukau Rd and Pah Rd.

== Local Personalities ==
Mr William Greenwood (1806–1895) was born in Brighton, England, but spent his early life in Bradford, Yorkshire. He travelled to Wellington, New Zealand in September 1840 before moving to Auckland after an earthquake hit Wellington. Greenwood was a stonemason by trade and was engaged by the government to build old St Paul's Church, completed in 1844. Greenwood's trowel was used by Governor Hobson when he laid the first foundation stone of St Paul's Church; the trowel was later presented to the city of Auckland by George S. Graham on behalf of Greenwood in 1894. It is now in the collection of the Auckland Art Gallery.

Sir John Logan Campbell (1817–1912)

John Logan Campbell was born in Edinburgh, Scotland. He studied medicine at the University of Edinburgh, but chose not to practice and instead was drawn overseas first to New South Wales in Australia and then on to New Zealand. Dr John Logan Campbell purchased 1,000 acre suburban farm located at Maungakiekie in September 1853, which he renamed One Tree Hill.

Dr Campbell made his name through different business enterprises and his political life, serving on more than 40 committees, boards, trusts or directorates over the space of five decades. He also served as Mayor for Auckland for three months during the Royal visit of the Duke and Duchess of Cornwall in 1901. The visit prompted Campbell to donate part of his estate, 230 acres of One Tree Hill, to the nation and calling this Cornwall Park in honour of the future king. The following year Dr Campbell was made a Bachelor Knight on the day intended as the coronation day of Edward VII, 26 June 1902.

Sir John Logan Campbell died on 22 June 1912, he was survived by his wife, most of their children had predeceased them both. The city of Auckland considered it the passing of one of their patriarchs.
