= Epsom Library =

Library in Auckland, New Zealand

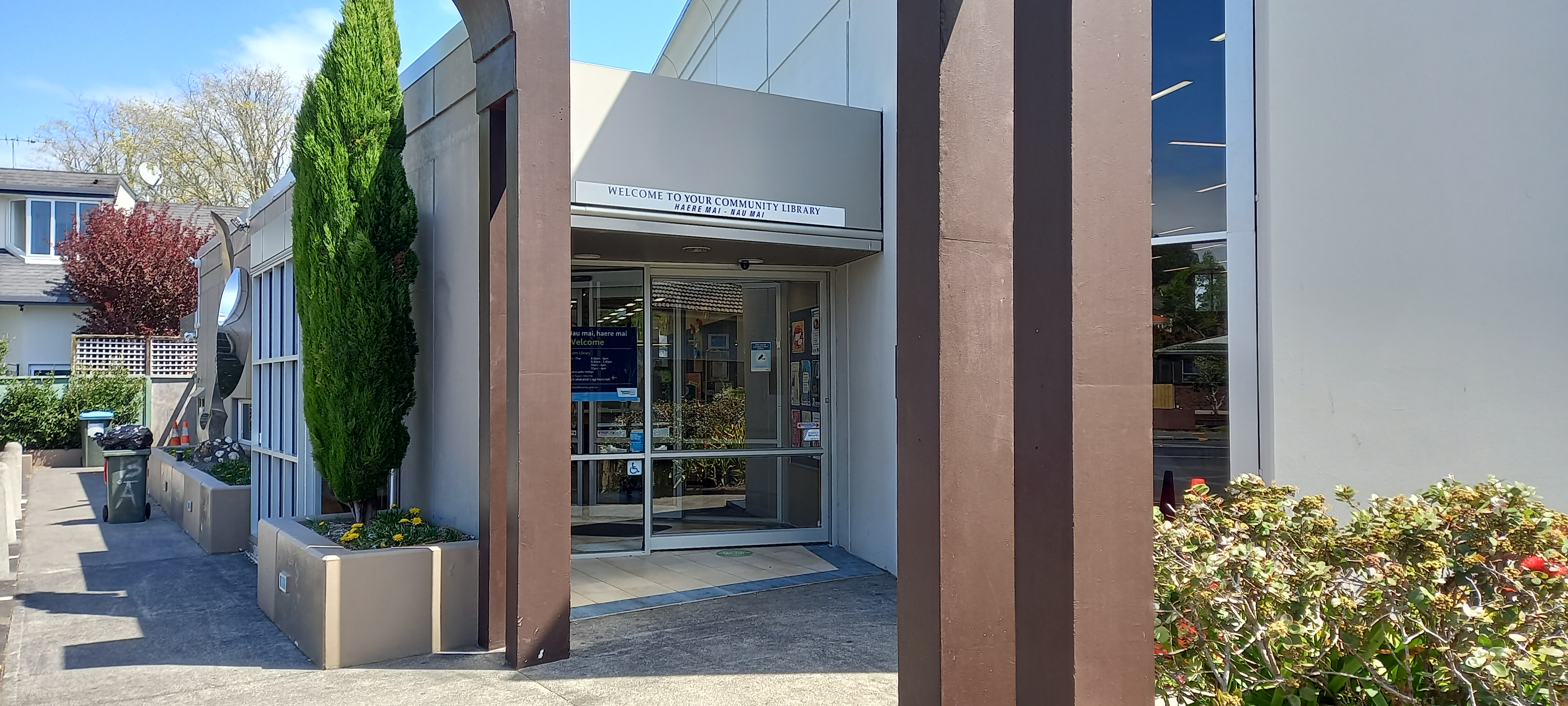
- The main entrance of Epsom Library, October 2022
- 36°52′54″S 174°46′32″E
- Location: 195 Manukau Rd, Epsom, New Zealand
- Type: Public library
- Established: 8 September 1882; 143 years ago
- Service area: Epsom, Newmarket, Mount Eden, Greenlane
- Branch of: Auckland Libraries

Collection
- Size: Floating

Other information
- Website: www.aucklandlibraries.govt.nz

Epsom Library is located at 195 Manukau Road, Epsom, Auckland. It is one of the 56 branches of Auckland Libraries that serves the residents in Epsom, Mt Eden, and Newmarket. Epsom Library, alongside Mount Roskill Library, Mount Albert Library and Point Chevalier Library, reports to the Albert-Eden Local Board.

== A brief history ==
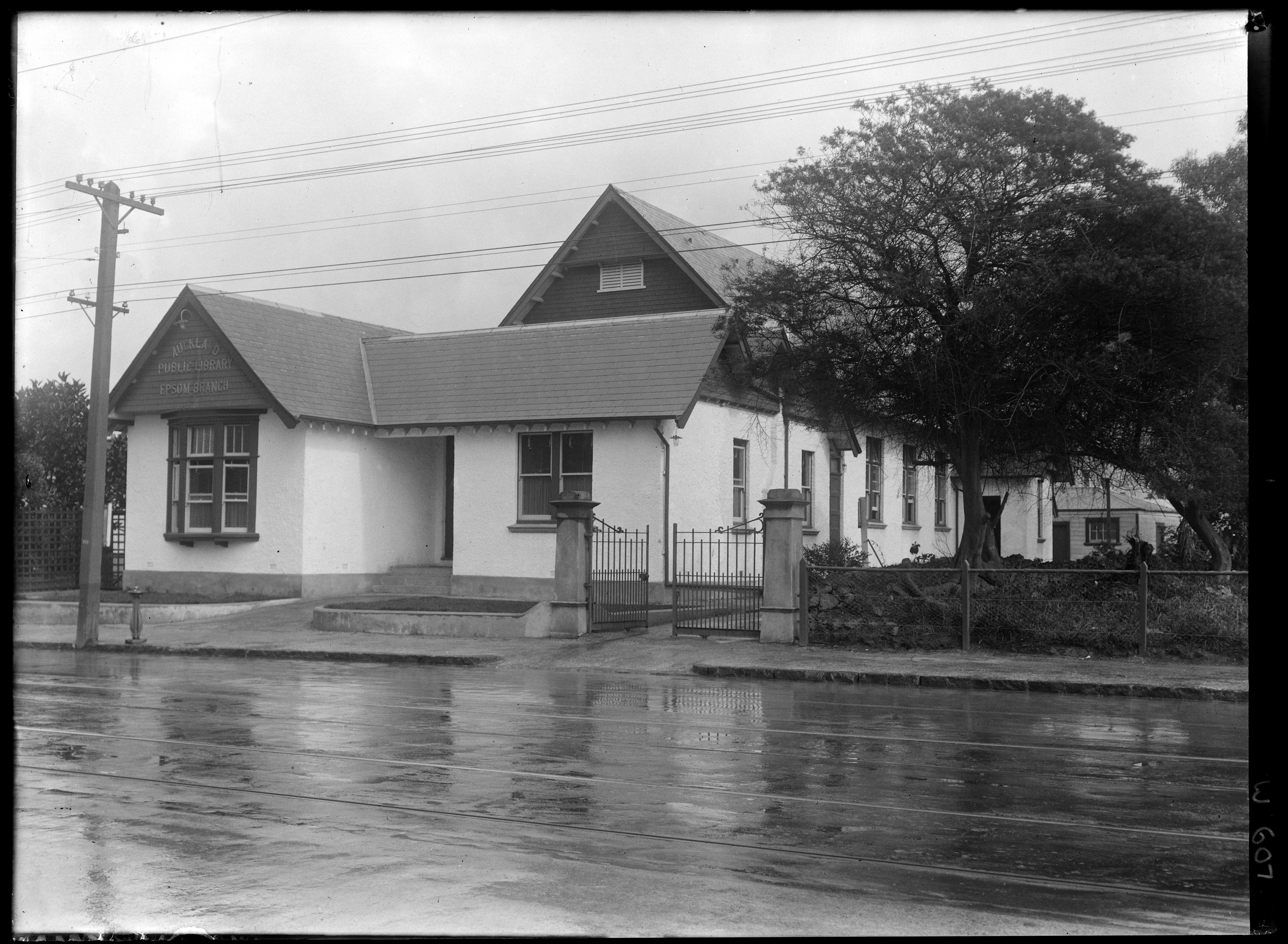
Epsom Library - Chief Librarian John Barr and Family occupied House next to Library (Pre 1930)

The original form of Epsom Public Library was established on 8 September 1882 by Epsom locals under the Public Libraries Powers Act 1875. It was in the Alba Road area but did not last very long due to the cease of funding by Education Department in 1887. A brief introduction on the library wall gives another version - the earliest form was established in 1880 by the Epsom Mutual Improvement Society.

In January 1917, the Epsom Road Board became a part of Auckland City. The building formerly used by Epsom Road Board and Manukau Water Supply Board on Manukau Road was repurposed to be the new library. The new Epsom Library was opened on 27 August 1918 by Mayor James Gunson, as the fourth branch library of the Auckland City Libraries. The City Librarian, John Barr and his family home was next door to the library until his retirement in 1952. Mabel Oliver started working in Epsom Library in 1923. She was deeply loved by children and other library patrons. Mabel died on the job in 1935. A remembrance plaque was installed within the current library building. In 1924, the library building got an extension and in 1930 the library further took over part of the hall. Becoming the 3rd busiest library among the suburban libraries of Auckland in 1970s, the building was further extended by another 93 m^{2} (1,000 sq ft) 1974 and 1975. This provided a small workroom for staff and an area for public seating.

There was a plan to build a larger library based in Newmarket, New Zealand in the early 1990s, but it was ultimately scrapped. It was finally replaced by a new plan to rebuild a new Epsom Library on the same site. Eighty years since the opening of Epsom Library on Manukau Road, the old Epsom Library building alongside the house next door once occupied by John Barr was knocked down for the current building.

On 29 August 1997, Mayor Les Mills officially opened the new building, after the old building was closed on 17 January of the same year. Three days later, on 1 September 1997, it opens its doors to the public. The new (current) building has twice the floor area to the old building. It was designed by Patterson Co-Partners Architects and was built by Hawkins Construction. The building is a pentagon, a very distinctive shape in Auckland region, even in New Zealand.

== Art works in the Epsom Library ==
The Epsom library features a woven artwork by Robyn Agnew named Connections, and the painting Looking North by Peter Siddell, which were both commissioned for the library.

=== Wētā Sculpture ===
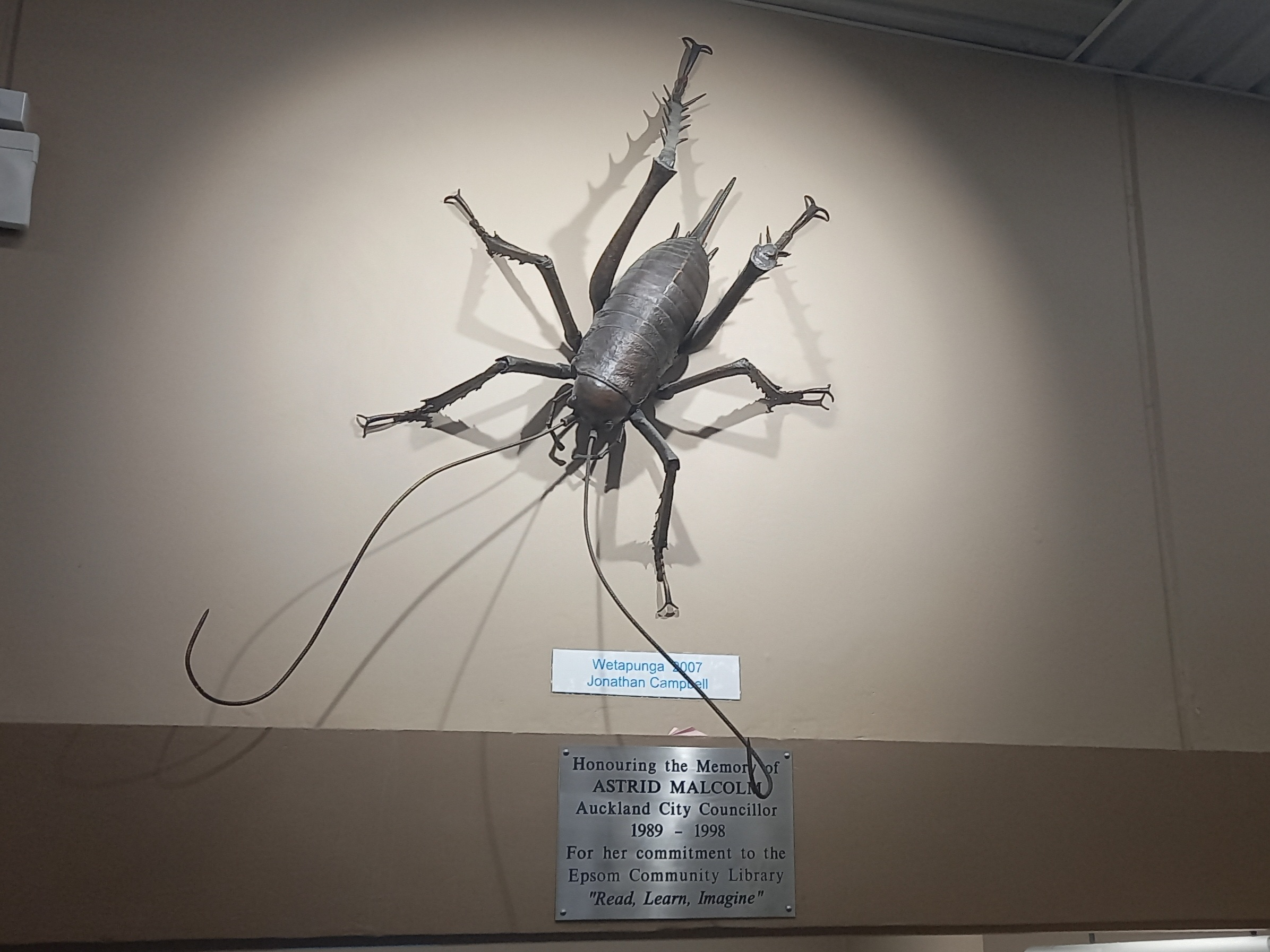
The Wētā Sculpture in Epsom Library

The bronze wētā sculpture (80 kg (180 lb) in weight, 1,500 mm (59 in) in length) was made to celebrate the 80th anniversary of Epsom Library in 1998. It was commissioned by Astrid Malcolm, a community board member then and was sculpted by Jonathan Campbell as one of a series of artworks. It was initially placed on a pillar outside the library.

On Wednesday, 10 January 2007, the wētā sculpture was found stolen from the grounds of Epsom Library by a library patron. However, the actual date and time of the theft remains a mystery and never recovered. A new wētā sculpture funded by the Hobson Community Board was unveiled to mark the library’s 90th anniversary in 2008. The new wētā sculpture was installed inside the library and a plague was put under the wētā to commemorate Astrid Malcolm who was killed in a diving accident in 2000.

=== Phoenix Rising sculpture ===
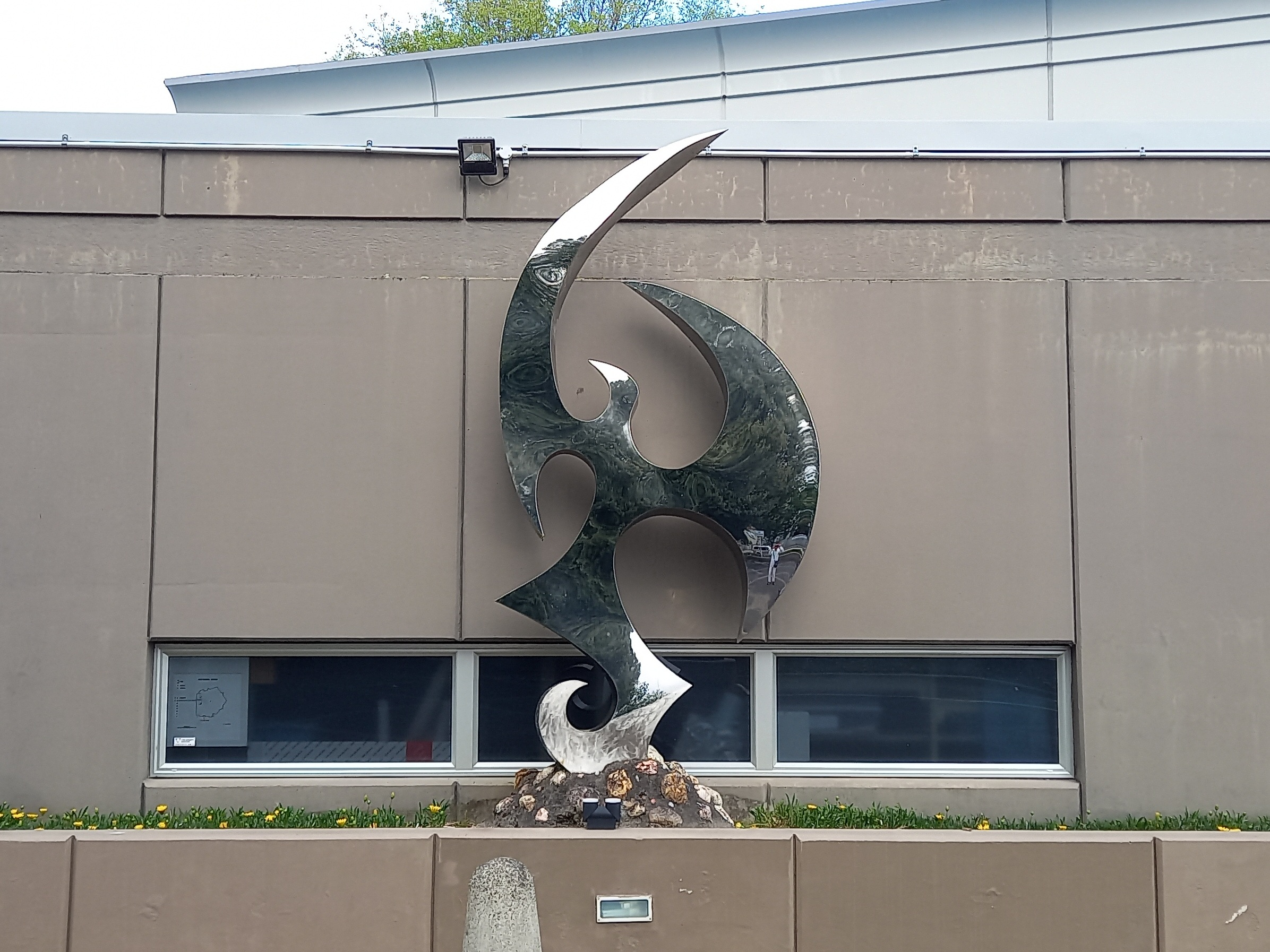
"Phoenix Rising" Sculpture at Epsom Library, Auckland

A 2 m (6 ft 7 in) tall stainless sculpture Rising Phoenix was installed outside the Epsom Library in 1998 to celebrate the library’s reopening of the new building. It was created by award-winning artist, Keith Simpson.

On Wednesday, 9 June 2004 library staff found the sculpture was stolen. Keith Simpson was recommissioned to create a new, slightly larger, Phoenix Rising Mark 2 to replace the stolen one. The new sculpture was reinstalled on 20 October 2005 and remains there up to now.

Ten years later, in February 2014, the original Rising Phoenix was found in a vacant house in Rangataua, near Ohakune (300 km (190 mi) away from Auckland) by police. This rediscovery was helped by an Aucklander who spotted the sculpture on a real estate website. This original sculpture was shipped back to Auckland.

The photo on the right shows the Rising Phoenix Mark 2 - the replacement, which the phoenix's head faces left. The phoenix’s head of the original sculpture was facing right.

== Library services ==
Apart from lending and information services, Epsom Library has scheduled children's programmes in each week as well as additional programmes over school holidays. Considering significant presence of Asian populations in Epsom/Mt Eden area, Epsom Library runs programmes specific to ethnic groups, such as Conversation in English.
