= Epsom Normal Primary School =

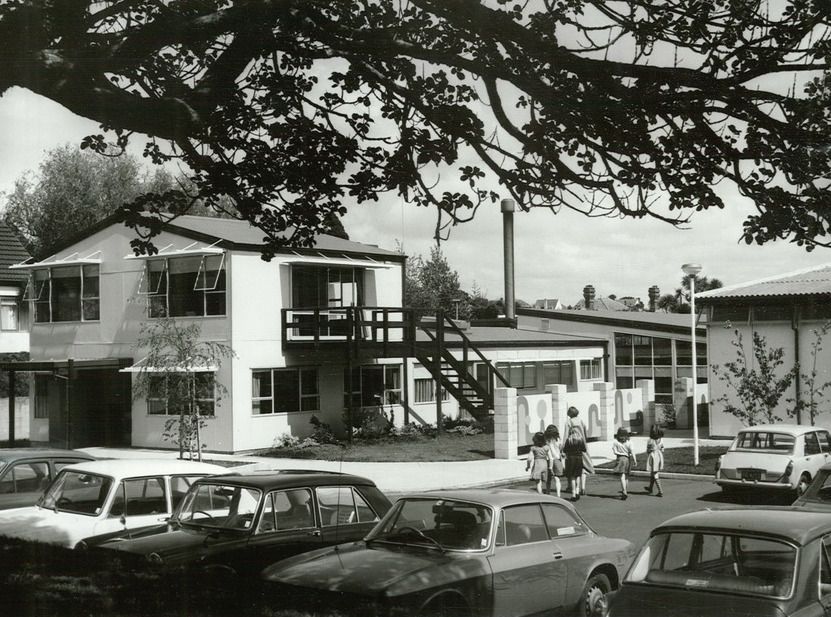
- Epsom Normal Primary School in 1976

Location
- 41 The Drive, Epsom, Auckland, New Zealand; 36.8905°S 174.7700°E

Information
- Type: State, Co-educational, Primary
- Motto: Together we are strong
- Established: 1886
- Ministry of Education Institution no.: 1270
- Principal: Ateel Sudhakar
- Enrolment: 611 (July 2026)
- Socio-economic decile: 8
- Website: www.epsomnormal.school.nz

Epsom Normal Primary School (abbreviated E.N.P.S.) is a co-educational state public primary school located in Epsom, Auckland, New Zealand which educates year 1-6 students. The school was established in 1886.

As of the 2013 Education Review Report, average attendance was 666 students, composed of 21% New Zealand European/Pākehā, 34% Chinese, 19% Indian, 3% Maori, and 23% "Other".
