= Israel Goldstine =

New Zealand politician

Israel Goldstine OBE
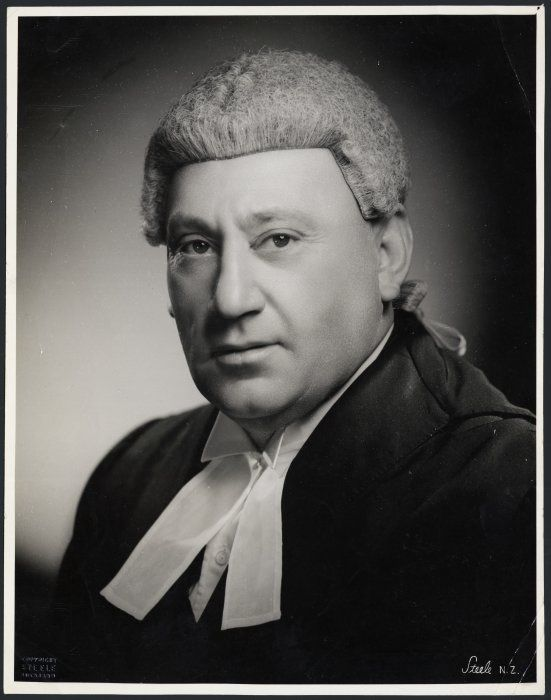

2nd Mayor of One Tree Hill
- In office 1931–1947
- Preceded by: Joseph Speight Hardwicke
- Succeeded by: Brian Preston Stevenson

Personal details
- Born: Israel Joseph Goldstine; 20 May 1898 Brisbane, Queensland, Australia
- Died: 16 January 1953 (aged 54) Auckland, New Zealand
- Spouse: Dora Solomon (m. 1924; died 1939)
- Profession: Barrister and solicitor

Israel Joseph Goldstine OBE (20 May 1898 – 16 January 1953) was mayor of One Tree Hill, New Zealand, from 1931 until he retired in 1947. He was a prominent barrister and solicitor in Auckland and chaired several high-profile New Zealand boards.

== Early life and education ==
Goldstine was born in Brisbane, Australia, but brought up and educated in Auckland, attending Auckland Grammar School. Goldstine studied law at Auckland University College. After serving his articles with William Joseph Napier he was admitted as a barrister of the Supreme Court of New Zealand on 18 February 1926.

== Career ==
=== Barrister and solicitor ===
Goldstine was a successful barrister and solicitor, and was described in court as displaying 'a doggedness and persistence which is noticeable even for a lawyer, and listeners have no cause to complain that his utterances are mumbled or indistinct'.

=== Politics ===
Goldstine became actively involved in local government at a young age. He was a member of the One Tree Hill Road Board in his twenties, and became its first deputy mayor when the board became a borough. Goldstine was elected mayor of One Tree Hill on 6 May 1931 at age 33, becoming New Zealand's youngest mayor.

When elected it was noted that his standing in local body affairs is attested by the fact that he is president of the Suburban Local Bodies' Association and an authority on finance, gaining much praise by his analysis of the finances of the Hospital Board. During his time as mayor he was praised for continuing to reduce rates despite large increases in other regions.

- In 1939 Goldstine and his council decided to plant 28 kauri trees along Aratonga Avenue, Greenlane to mark Arbor Day. They were the first local body to plant kauris in a street. The trees were planted by the Mayor and Mayoress, the deputy-Mayor and his wife, each of the One Tree Hill councilors and the town clerk, and local body and school representatives of the district. The trees were chosen because they would not grow fast enough to interfere with the power lines. It was agreed that by the time they reach that height, power lines would be underground. "And so will we!", Goldstine was quoted as saying.
- Goldstine opposed a suggestion put forward that the name of One Tree Hill should be changed to Maungakiekie. He pointed out that the name One Tree Hill had been in use for more than a century, and the district took its name from the hill in 1873. He said the name Maungakiekie meant the hill of the kiekie plant, which no longer grew there, and the name was also difficult to pronounce correctly and would cause confusion. George Graham, the secretary of the Akarana Maori Association, also agreed that the name One Tree Hill should be retained.
- Sir John Logan Campbell bequeathed £5000 for an obelisk on the summit of One Tree Hill as a memorial to Māori. Prior to its construction, the One Tree Hill council suggested the funds be diverted to provide finance for swimming baths in Cornwall Park because of engineering difficulties in erecting the obelisk. Goldstine opposed this, stating that the money had been set aside for a specific purpose, and if it were impossible to conform with Campbell's wishes, the council should adhere to his wishes as near as practicable. Goldstine presided as mayor during construction of the obelisk which was completed in 1940, although the unveiling was delayed until after World War II on 24 April 1948. This was in keeping with Māori custom of not holding such ceremonies during a time of bloodshed.

Goldstine held the position of Mayor until his retirement from politics in 1947.

=== Business ===
Auckland Metropolitan Milk Council

Goldstine served as chair of the Milk Council for 10 years. This time coincided with World War II, and a lot of his time was spent overseeing the restrictions on the sale of cream, the delivery of milk to schools, and ensuring milk delivery to homes continued with the ongoing petrol rationing and delivery men serving in the war.

Local Government Commission

The first Local Government Commission was established in 1947 to reform New Zealand's 695 local commissions, which was considered too many for a country with a population of 1.5 million people. New Zealand Labour Party MP Bill Parry appointed Goldstine as chair of the commission. In this position, Goldstine enjoyed the salary and privileges of a Judge of the Supreme Court, and was known as Judge Goldstine. The commission adopted the Court's strict dress code of wigs and gowns, somewhat to the dismay of the Law Society. Goldstine held this position until his sudden death in 1953.

Other business

Goldstine was Vice President of the New Zealand Municipal Association, member for 14 years of the Auckland Suburban Drainage Board and chairman for two and a half years of the Auckland (NZ) Armed Forces Appeal Board. During World War II Goldstine was appointed to the National Patriotic Fund Board and the National Patriotic Council. He became deputy chairman of the Auckland Provincial Patriotic Council.

== Positions held ==
- Mayor of One Tree Hill (1931–1947)
- Deputy Mayor of One Tree Hill
- Chair of the first Local Government Commission
- Chair of the Auckland (NZ) Armed Forces Appeal Board
- Chair of the Auckland Metropolitan Milk Council
- Deputy Chairman of the Auckland Provincial Patriotic Council
- President of the One Tree Hill Red Cross
- Vice President of the New Zealand Municipal Association
- Member of the National Patriotic Fund Board and the National Patriotic Council
- Member of the Auckland Suburban Drainage Board
- Member of the One Tree Hill Board
- Barrister and Solicitor

== Honours and awards ==
Goldstine was awarded the King George VI Coronation Medal in 1937. In the 1946 New Year Honours, he was appointed an Officer of the Order of the British Empire, for patriotic and social welfare services.

== Honorific eponym ==
- Margot Street, Epsom, New Zealand, was renamed from Williamson Street in 1933 after Goldstine's daughter.
- Goldstine Place, Epsom, New Zealand, was created and named in 1996 when the former Transport Board Workshops site was subdivided.

== Personal life ==
Goldstine married Dora Solomon in 1924. Goldstine and Solomon had two children, John and Margot.

Solomon died on 20 August 1939, aged 38. She was actively associated with Goldstine's public activities; just prior to her death she had been convener of the Women's Emergency Precautions Committee of Epsom and One Tree Hill. Upon learning of her death, the chairman of the Auckland Transport Board, W. H. Nagle, paid tribute to the charitable, philanthropic and civic activities of Solomon and her devotion to humanitarian causes.

Goldstine was better known among friends and colleagues as 'Izzy', and was known for his sense of humor while conducting business.

Goldstine showed a fondness for sport and particularly enjoyed watching tennis and football. In his earlier years he played football as an Auckland representative. He frequently played golf in Maungakiekie and was quoted as saying: "I have no pretensions to being a 'real' golfer, but I live in hope of reducing my handicap some day."

Goldstine travelled frequently to Australia, which often influenced his ideas in politics and business.
