= One Tree Hill, New Zealand =

One Tree Hill
- Suburb
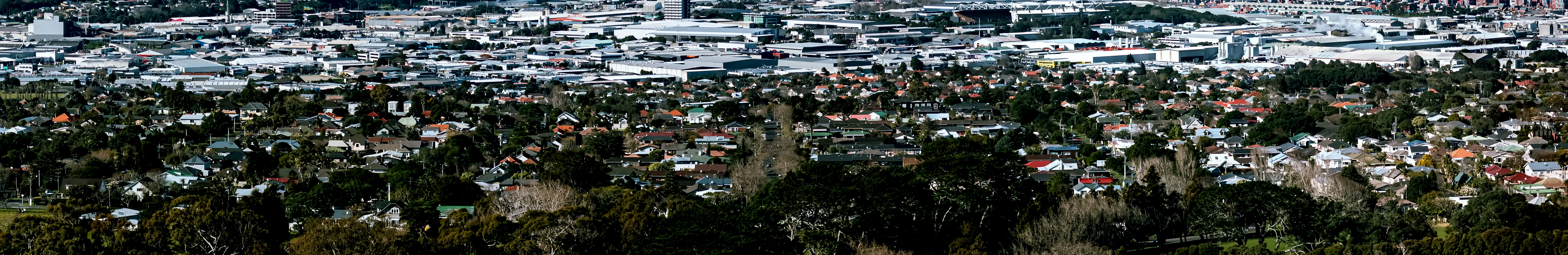
- A view of the suburb from Maungakiekie / One Tree Hill
- Interactive map of One Tree Hill
- Coordinates: 36.908°S 174.795°E
- Country: New Zealand
- City: Auckland
- Local authority: Auckland Council
- Electoral ward: Maungakiekie-Tāmaki ward
- Local board: Maungakiekie-Tāmaki Local Board

Area
  - Land: 275 ha (680 acres)

Population (June 2025)
  - Total: 4,920
  - Density: 1,790/km^{2} (4,630/sq mi)
- Hospitals: Greenlane Clinical Centre

Epsom	Greenlane	Ellerslie
Royal Oak	One Tree Hill	Mount Wellington
Onehunga		Penrose

One Tree Hill is a suburb of Auckland, New Zealand. The residential part of the suburb is located to the east and south-east of Maungakiekie / One Tree Hill, from which it takes its name, with the volcanic peak located within the suburb's boundaries.

The suburb was established in the 1930s. Many period bungalows remain. Cornwall Park and Maungakiekie are major attractions within the suburb.

== Demographics ==
One Tree Hill covers 2.75 km^{2} (1.06 sq mi) and had an estimated population of 4,920 as of June 2025, with a population density of 1,789 people per km^{2}.

Historical population
Year	Pop.	±% p.a.
2006	4,125	—
2013	4,161	+0.12%
2018	4,506	+1.61%
2023	4,500	−0.03%

One Tree Hill had a population of 4,500 in the 2023 New Zealand census, a decrease of 6 people (−0.1%) since the 2018 census, and an increase of 339 people (8.1%) since the 2013 census. There were 2,190 males, 2,286 females and 24 people of other genders in 1,704 dwellings. 4.1% of people identified as LGBTIQ+. The median age was 36.0 years (compared with 38.1 years nationally). There were 792 people (17.6%) aged under 15 years, 831 (18.5%) aged 15 to 29, 2,340 (52.0%) aged 30 to 64, and 537 (11.9%) aged 65 or older.

People could identify as more than one ethnicity. The results were 58.7% European (Pākehā); 9.4% Māori; 12.5% Pasifika; 27.1% Asian; 4.1% Middle Eastern, Latin American and African New Zealanders (MELAA); and 2.0% other, which includes people giving their ethnicity as "New Zealander". English was spoken by 92.8%, Māori language by 2.1%, Samoan by 2.4%, and other languages by 28.1%. No language could be spoken by 2.8% (e.g. too young to talk). New Zealand Sign Language was known by 0.5%. The percentage of people born overseas was 38.0, compared with 28.8% nationally.

Religious affiliations were 34.9% Christian, 2.7% Hindu, 2.6% Islam, 0.5% Māori religious beliefs, 1.7% Buddhist, 0.2% New Age, 0.1% Jewish, and 1.5% other religions. People who answered that they had no religion were 49.2%, and 6.9% of people did not answer the census question.

Of those at least 15 years old, 1,647 (44.4%) people had a bachelor's or higher degree, 1,350 (36.4%) had a post-high school certificate or diploma, and 705 (19.0%) people exclusively held high school qualifications. The median income was $56,100, compared with $41,500 nationally. 798 people (21.5%) earned over $100,000 compared to 12.1% nationally. The employment status of those at least 15 was that 2,220 (59.9%) people were employed full-time, 420 (11.3%) were part-time, and 102 (2.8%) were unemployed.

Individual statistical areas
Name	Area (km^{2})	Population	Density (per km^{2})	Dwellings	Median age	Median income
One Tree Hill Amaru	2.22	2,343	1,055	921	36.8 years	$58,400
One Tree Hill Oranga	0.53	2,154	4,064	783	35.1 years	$53,900
New Zealand					38.1 years	$41,500

== Education ==
Oranga School is a coeducational contributing primary school (years 1–6) with a roll of 224 as of July 2026.

== Notable people ==
- Cicely Hilda Farmer (1870–1955), novelist (born in One Tree Hill)
- Arthur Hall (1880–1931), MP for the Reform Party and farmer (born in One Tree Hill)

== Local government ==
One Tree Hill was first governed by the One Tree Hill Road District in 1863. In 1930 the One Tree Hill Borough was formed. in 1989 it was absorbed into Auckland City.

=== Mayors ===
The One Tree Hill Borough had 8 mayors:

	Name	Term of office	
1	Joseph Speight Hardwicke	1930	1931
2	Israel Goldstine	1931	1947
3	Brian Preston Stevenson	1947	1956
4	Francis William Laidlaw Milne	1956	1968
5	Walter Adolph Race	1968	1971
6	Leonard Jack Harley	1971	1971
7	Harold Cooper Sadgrove	1971	1974
8	Jack Dickey	1974	1989
