= Almorah Rock Forest =

Biome on the Auckland isthmus, New Zealand

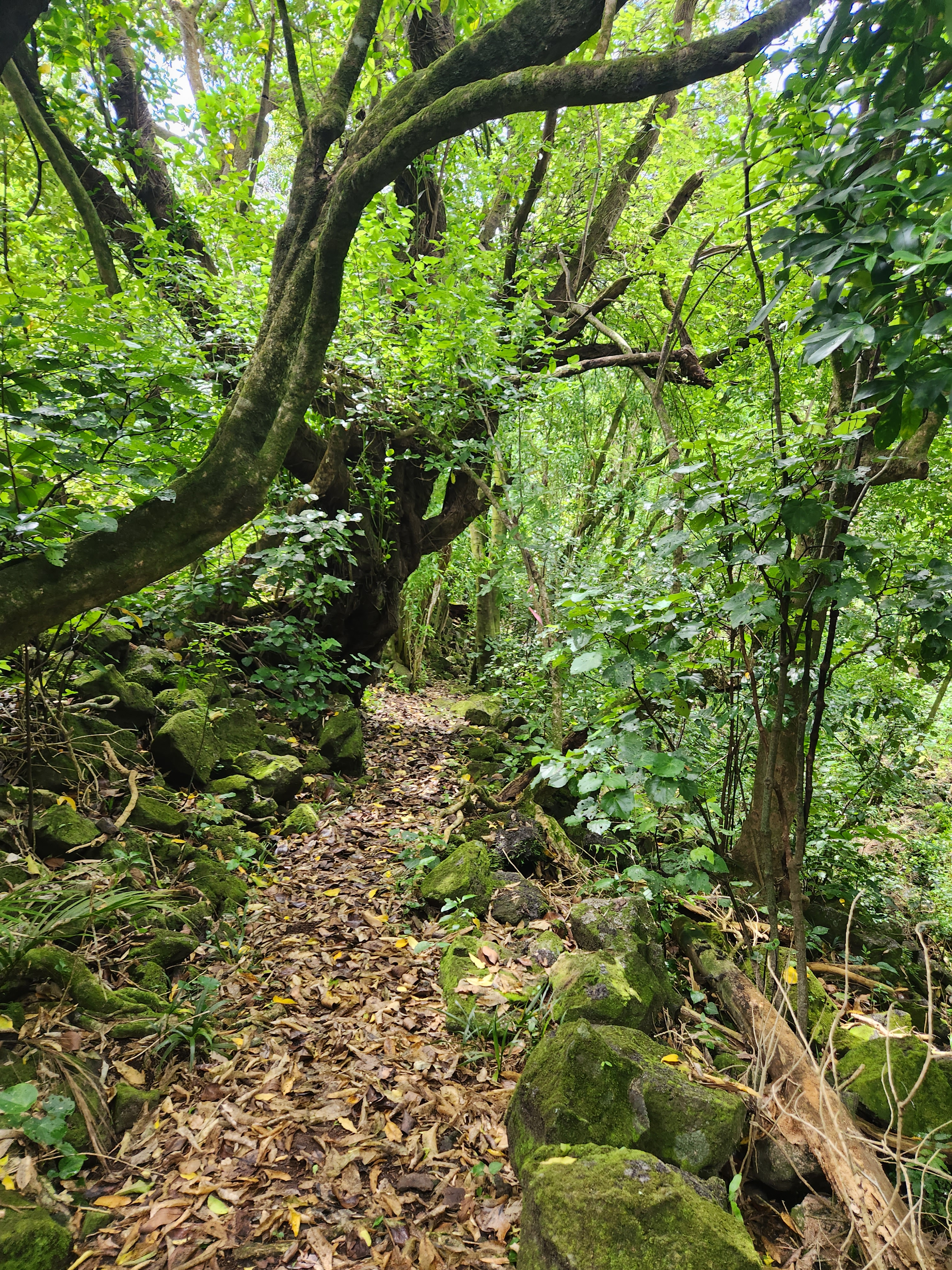
- View of a remaining portion of the Almorah Road Rock Forest taken from Withiel Thomas Reserve.

Ecology
- Realm: Australasian
- Biome: temperate broadleaf and mixed forests

Geography
- Area: 0.032 km^{2} (0.012 sq mi)
- Country: New Zealand
- Region: Auckland Region
- Coordinates: 36.874°S 174.772°E

The Almorah Rock Forest (also known as the Epsom Rock Forest) is a lava rock forest located on the northeastern slope of Maungawhau / Mount Eden, in Auckland, New Zealand. It is one of the few remaining lava rock forest patches in the region.

== Geography ==
The forest established itself upon lava fields surrounding Maungawhau/Mount Eden, which were formed 28,000 years ago. These fields were formed through the movement of magma through the scoria base of Maungawhau/Mount Eden leading to lava flows down the slope of the volcano. This magma solidified to create deposits of basalt rock.

The Almorah Rock Forest was once 5,000 hectares (12,000 acres) in size, but has since been reduced to a 3.2 hectares (7.9 acres) pocket of land encompassing three small reserves and a number of private properties making up the majority of remaining lava rock forest in Auckland. Together these are designated as a Significant Ecological Area by Auckland Council.

The basalt forest floor contains a limited amount of soil, but accumulates leaf litter allowing plants to germinate between large boulders.

== Biodiversity ==
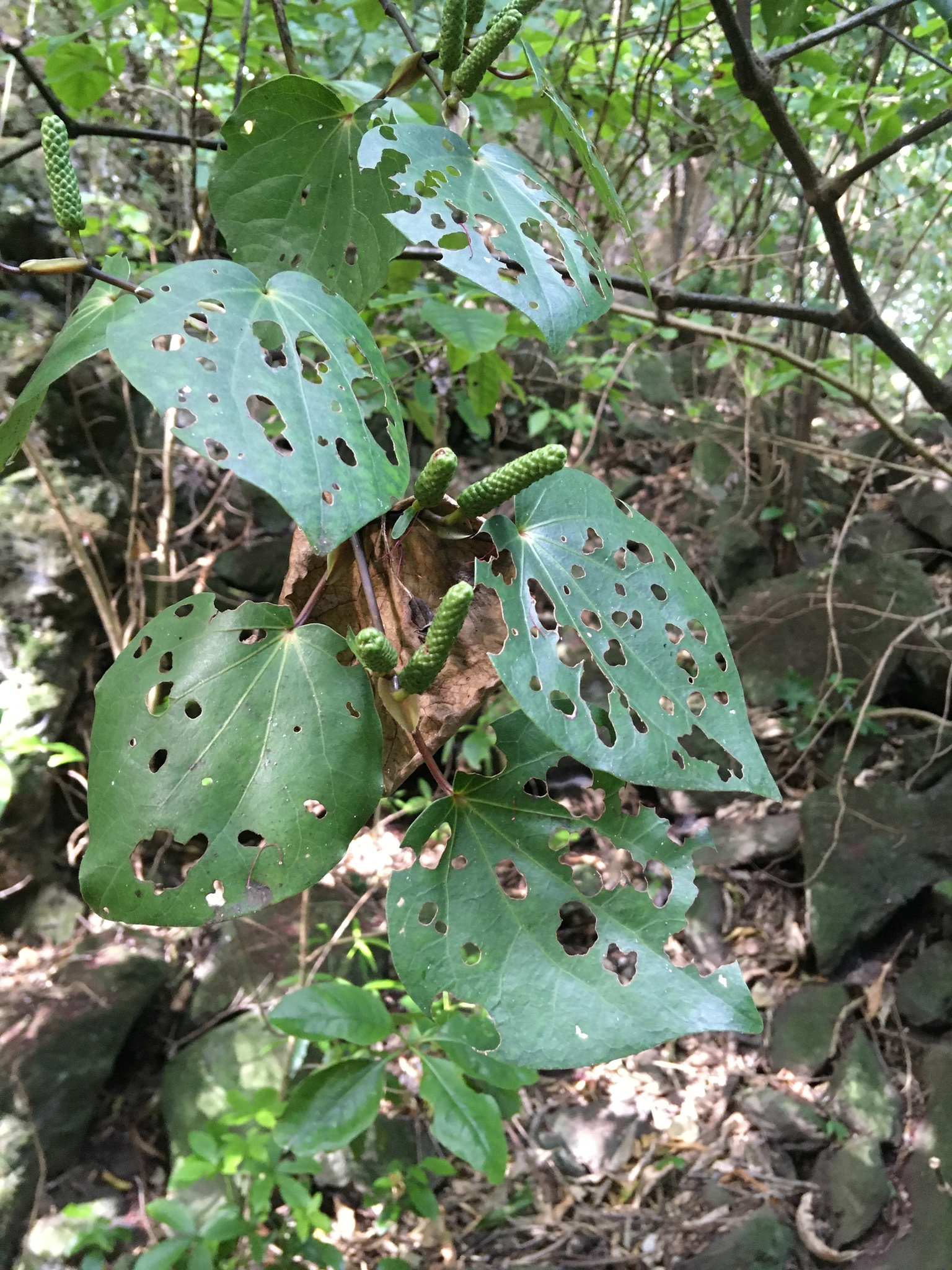
Kawakawa (Piper excelsum) in the understory of Withiel Thomas Reserve

The Almorah Rock Forest hosts a variety of native and introduced flora and fauna.

=== Flora ===
The Almorah Rock Forest is a broadleaf forest. A study by Smale and Gardner in 1999 found that 40% of plant species identified in the Withiel Reserve were native. Large native canopy trees found within the Almorah Rock Forest include; Mangeao (Litsea Calicaris), Tītoki (Alectryon excelsus), Pūriri (Vitex Lucens), Kohe Kohe (Dysoxylum spectabile) and Akapuka (Griselinia lucida). Sub-canopy species include Māhoe (Melicytus ramiflorous), Houpara (Pseudopanax lessonii). Native understory plants include Kawa Kawa(Piper excelsum) and Karamū(Coprosma robusta). A variety of ferns have also been noted on the forest floor, such as King Ferns (Ptisana salicina) Additionally, a rare and native fern species known as Sickle Fern (Pellaea falcata), was found to have regenerated within the forest.

The Almorah Rock Forest also contains various introduced weeds such as Climbing Asparagus[Asparagus scandens] and Japanese Hill Cherry (Prunus serrulata). In 2016, works were carried out in collaboration between Auckland Council and the Auckland Motorway Alliance to remove 40 invasive tree privets from the northeastern edge of the forest.

=== Fauna ===
The Almorah Rock Forests provide a favorable habitat for native bird species including Kererū (Hemiphaga novaeseelandiae), Pīwakawaka/Fantail (Rhipidura fuliginosa) and Tūī (Prosthemadera novaeseelandiae). Kākā (Nestor meridionalis) and Tauhou/Silvereye (Zosterops lateralis) have also been spotted there.

Auckland Council notes the presence of introduced mammals, particularly rodents and possums, within the rock forest. Possums pose a threat to native biodiversity by feeding on indigenous plants. and attacking native birds. Rats predate native birds eggs and chicks as well as consuming plant seeds on the forest floor and therefore negatively affecting forest regeneration processes. Urban Ark - Manawa Taiao is a support organisation for a range of community conservation group including the Maungawhau Ecological Halo, which since 2021 has created a network of backyard traps around the rock forest patches and Maungawhau to reduce the number of mammalian predators in the area.

== History ==
=== Early history ===
Much of the native forest of the Auckland isthmus is believed to have been burned and repurposed for cultivation by Māori settlers starting in the 13th century. This likely included portions of the Almorah Rock Forest due to its proximity to a pā site on Maungawhau/Mount Eden. The pā was occupied by various iwi over time, such as Ngā Oho, before being occupied by Huakaiwaka, which was made up by various iwi and hapū. In 18th century, the pā site was left vacant as a result of warfare.

=== Post 1840 ===
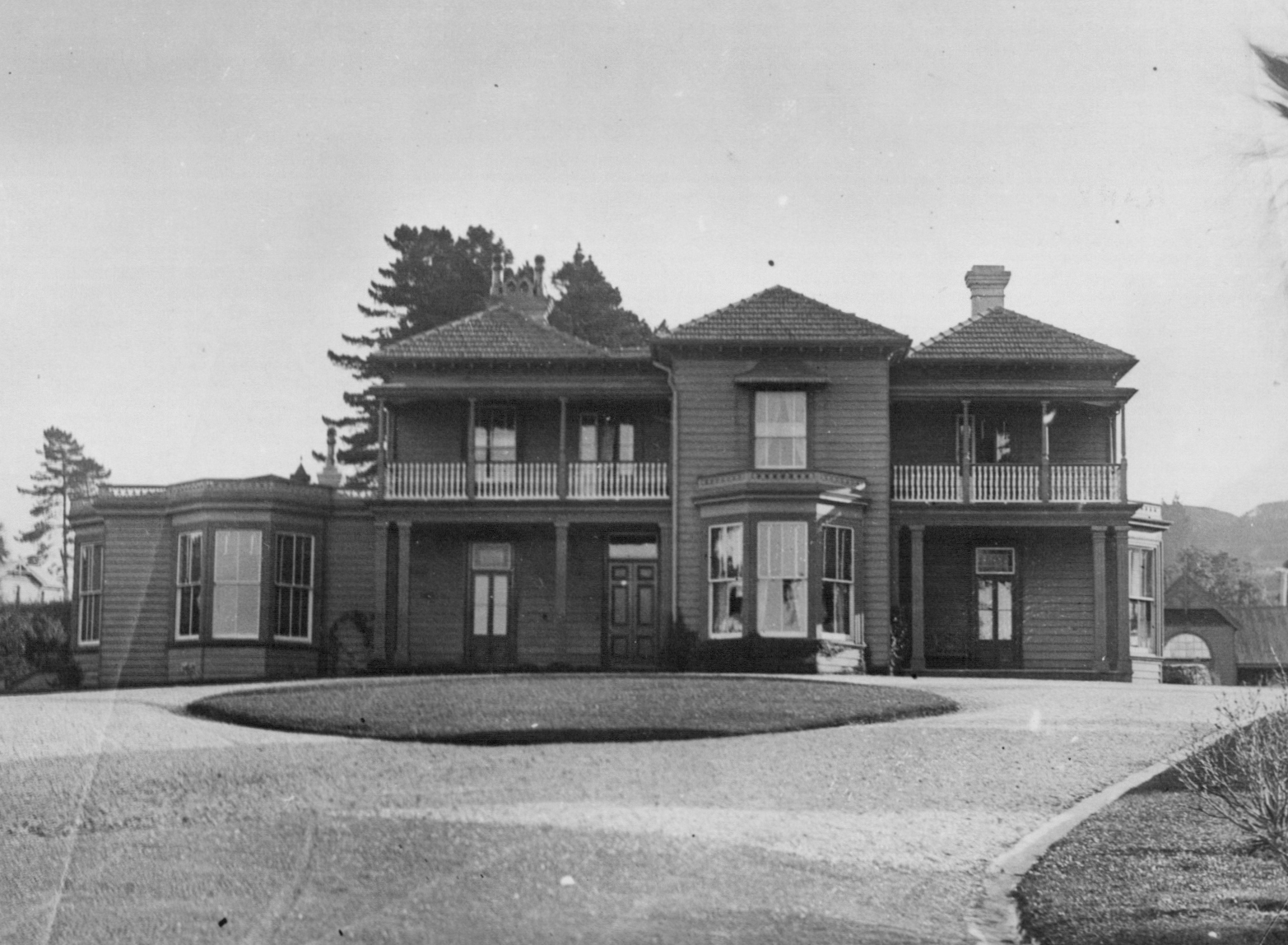
Rockwood House in 1901

The Almorah Rock Forest area was sought after by European settlers as a place of residence. In 1865, Rockwood House was constructed near the rock forest. In 1876, the house and its surrounding forest was depicted in a painting by Alfred Sharpe. Subdivision in the area continued until the 1980s, when it was halted due to ecological and architectural heritage concerns

In 1948, the descendants of Algernon Thomas gifted the city a 0.7 hectares (1.7 acres) block of land within the Almorah Rock Forest. This land had belonged to Thomas during his lifetime. Thomas was natural history scholar and became one of the first professors of the Auckland University College in 1883. Thomas was a conservationist who called for the protection of native bird species in 1886. This block of land is now called the Withiel Thomas Reserve and is available for public access.

In 2001, a 1.4 hectares (3.5 acres) site of the Almorah Road Rock Forest was placed under the ownership of the Department of Conservation following public controversy over a resource consent application for a developer to construct a series of dwellings on the site. The decision was made following negotiations with the developer.

In 2014, a landowner was fined $16,250 after felling vegetation and removing rock in breach of the Auckland Unitary Plan.

== Gallery ==
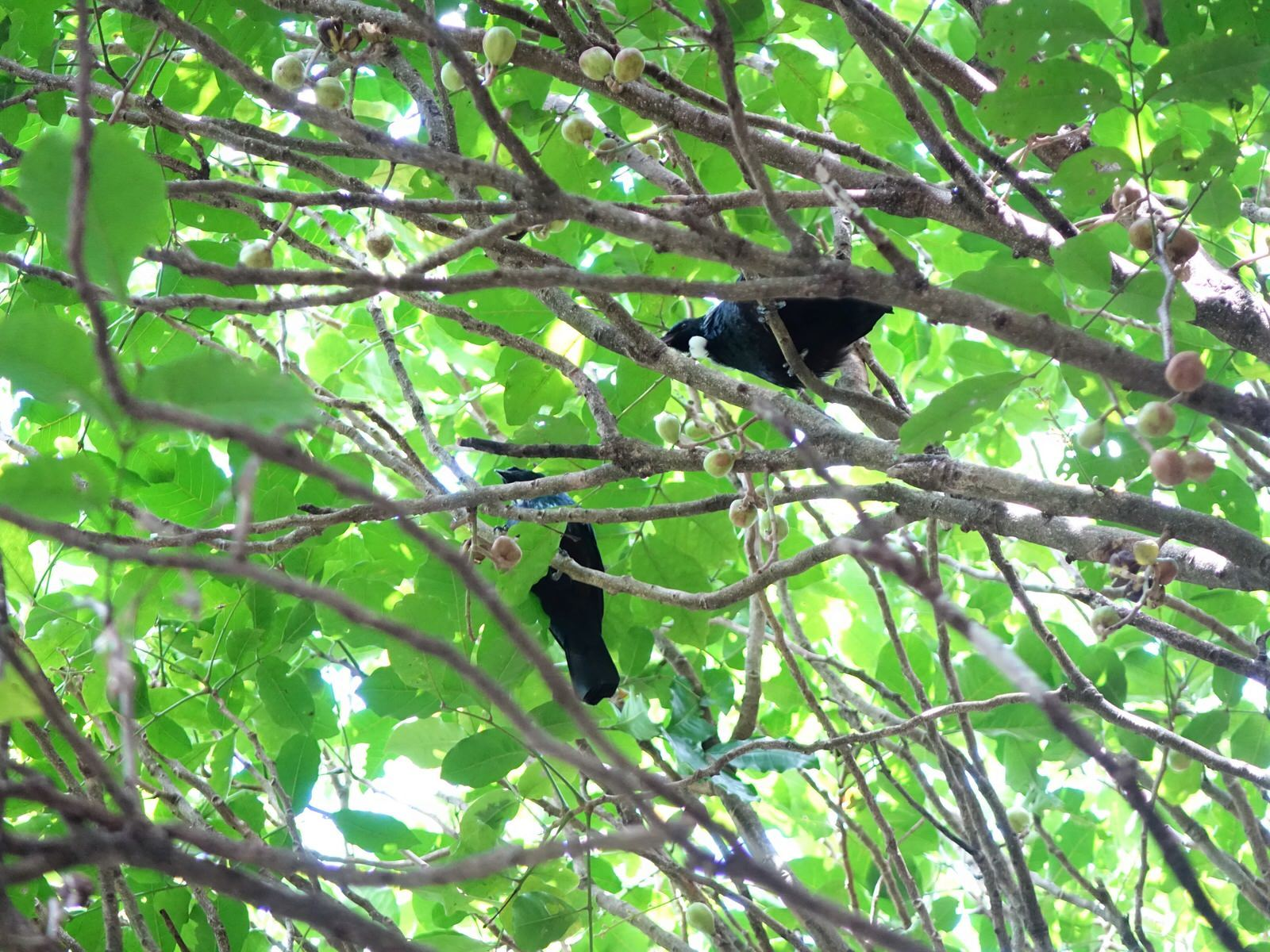
Tūī in a kohekohe tree on Almorah Road

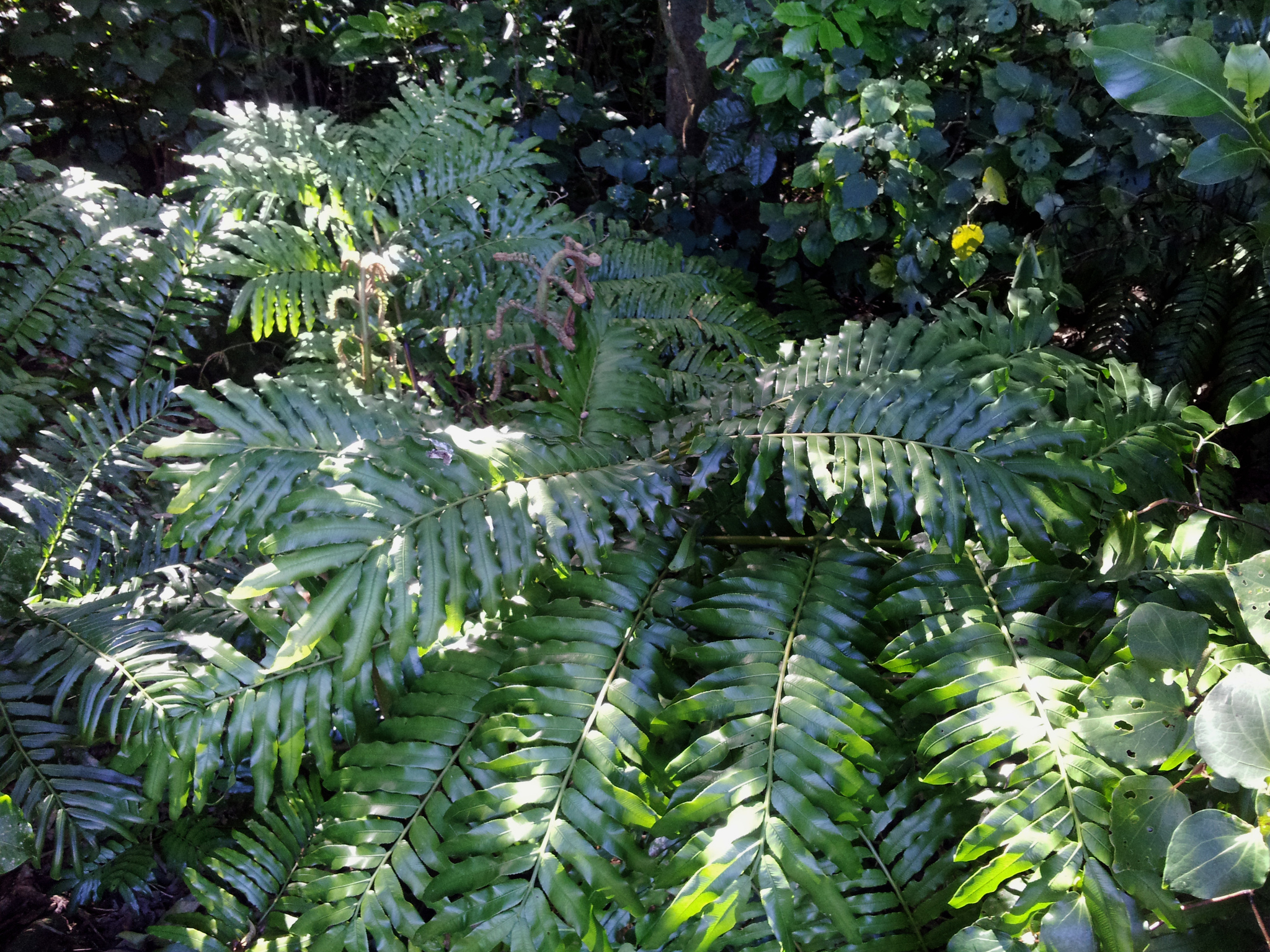
King Fern (Ptisana salicina) in the Almorah Rock Forest near the Auckland Southern Motorway

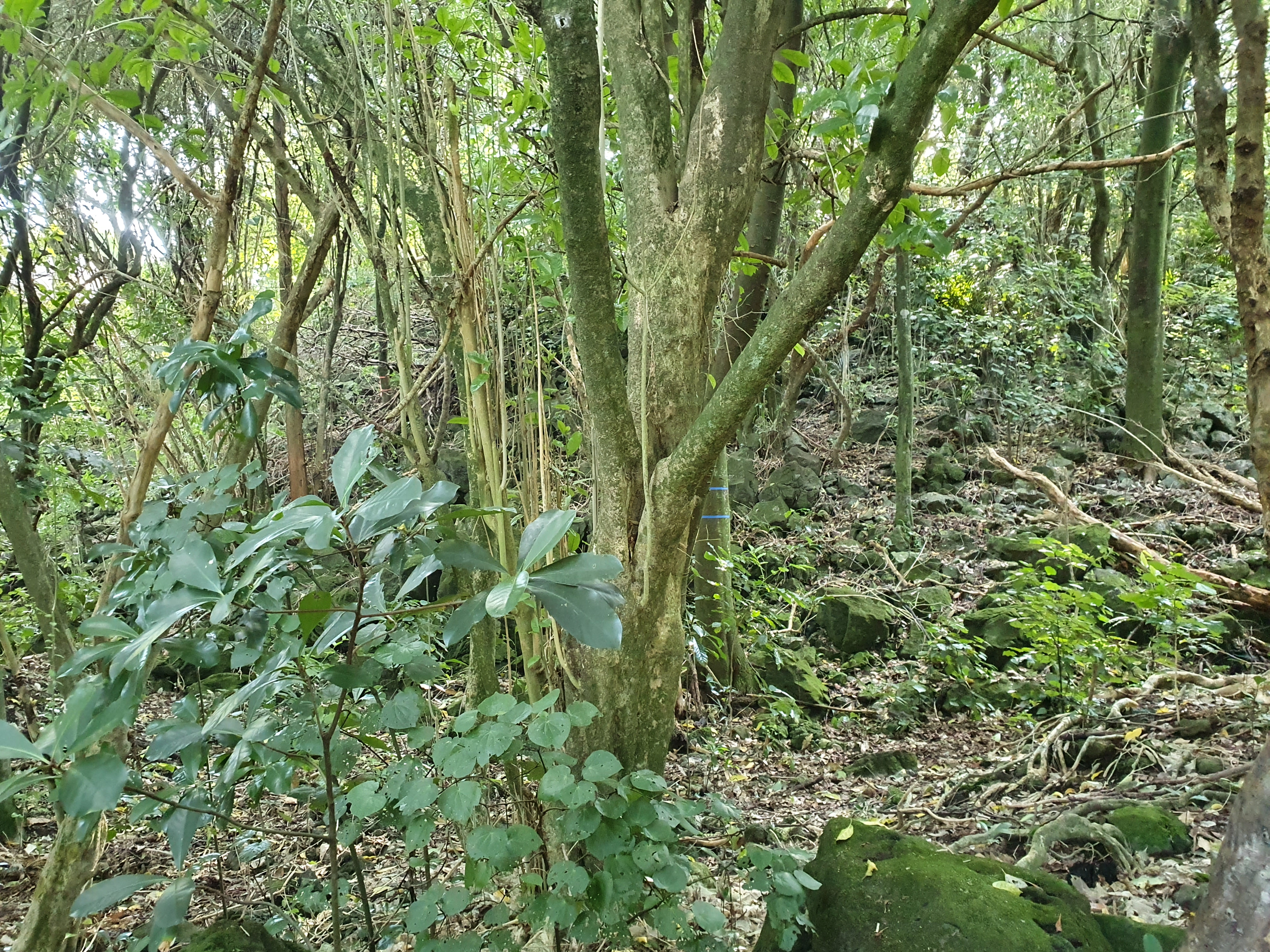
Withiel Thomas Reserve, with kawakawa (Piper excelsum) and houpara (Pseudopanax lessonii) in the foreground

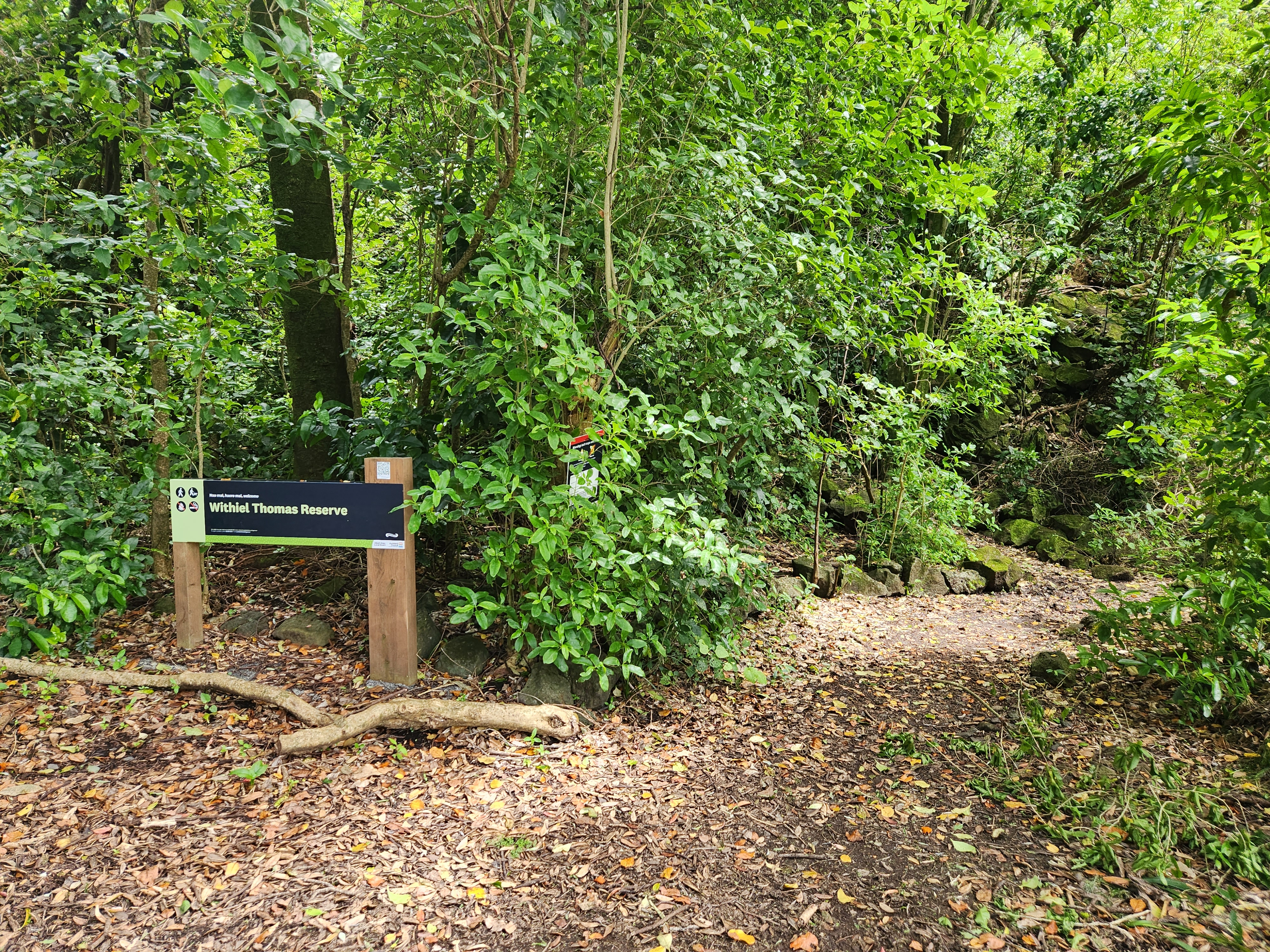
Entrance to Withiel Thomas Reserve
