= Te Pou Hawaiki =

Former volcano in New Zealand

- Epsom Avenue, Ōwhatihue
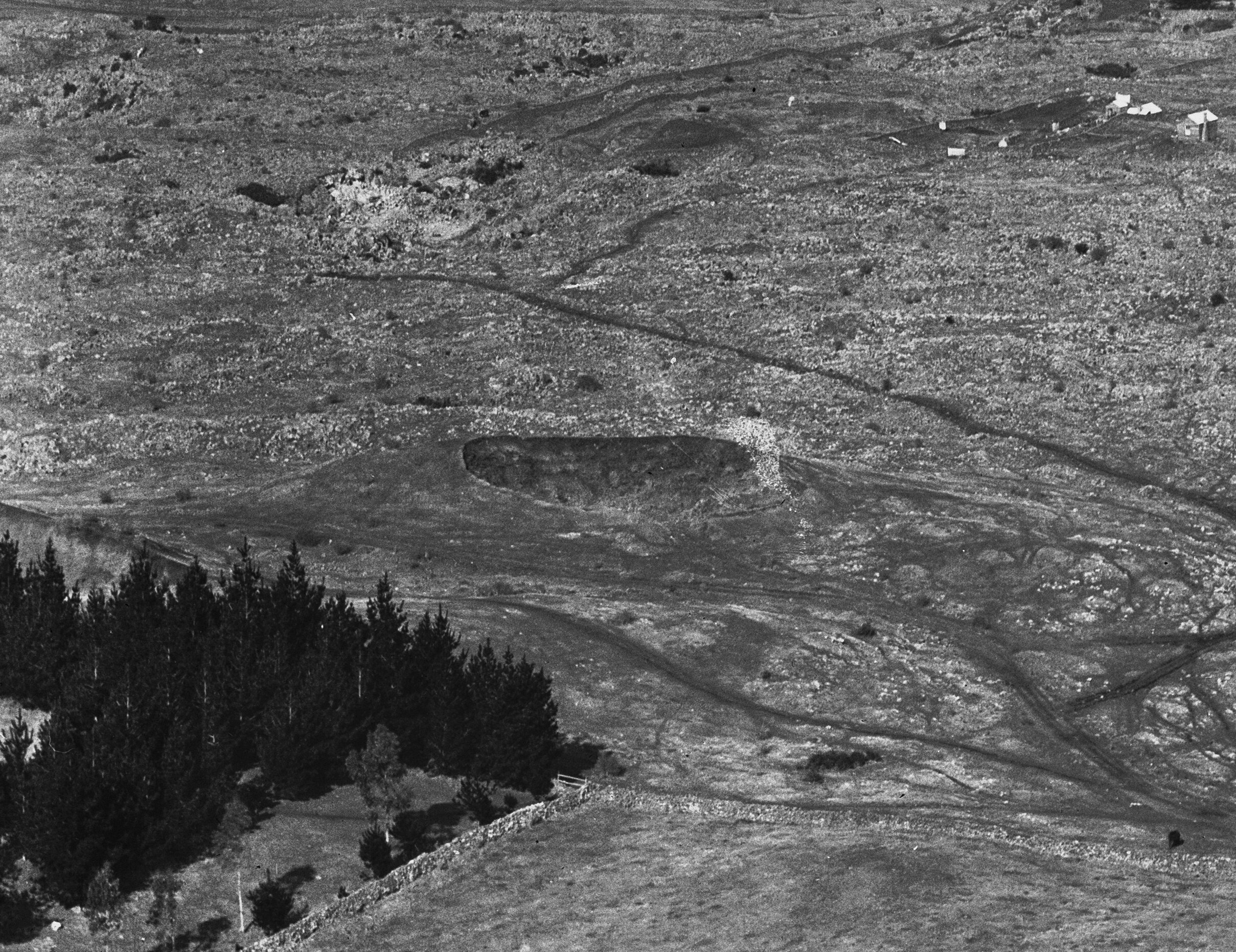
- Te Pou Hawaiki, seen from Mount Eden in 1884

Highest point
- Coordinates: 36.88247°S 174.766726°E

Geography
- Location: North Island, New Zealand

Geology
- Rock age: 153,000 years
- Volcanic field: Auckland volcanic field

Te Pou Hawaiki (also known as Epsom Avenue or Ōwhatihue) is a volcano in the Auckland volcanic field in New Zealand. It was a small, low scoria cone south-east of Mount Eden that was quarried away in the early 20th century.

== Geology ==
The volcano was located approximately 600 metres south-southeast of the Maungawhau / Mount Eden crater, and was between 100 and 150 metres in diameter. Te Pou Hawaiki is older than Maungawhau / Mount Eden. Because of this, it is estimated to have erupted at least 28,000 years ago, with estimates suggesting the volcano's eruption occurred 153,000 years ago or earlier.

== History ==
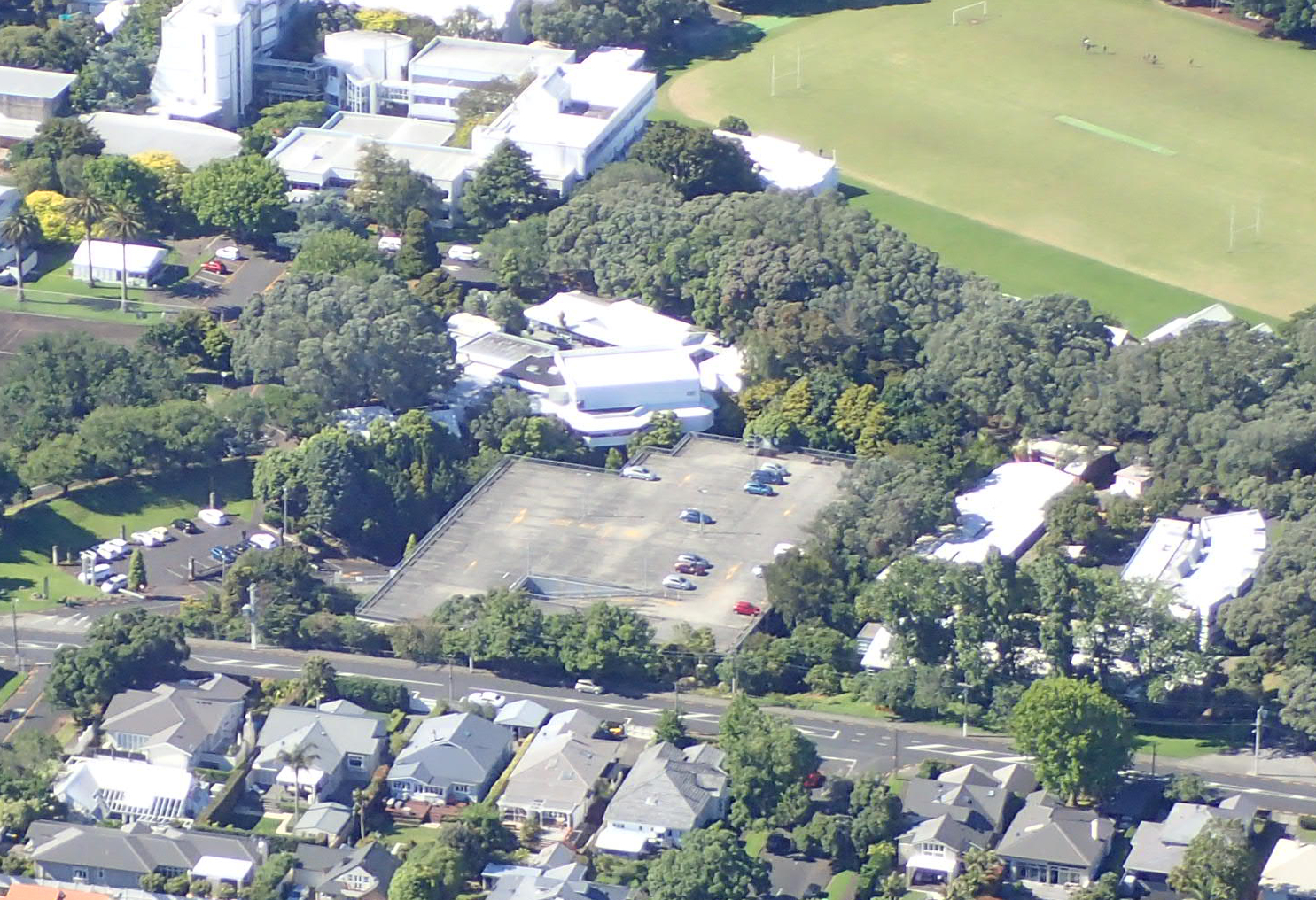
The modern location of Te Pou Hawaiki, which is a carpark for the Auckland College of Education

Te Pou Hawaiki was used as a place for rituals for Tāmaki Māori. Soil from Hawaiki (the Māori homeland) was placed at the site during the early settlement period, and rituals were performed here prior to major hunting and fishing expeditions. The volcano was the site of a small pā known as Ōwhatihue, and a path known as Aratakihaere ("The Path of Single File") led between Maungawhau / Mount Eden and Te Pou Hawaiki.

The volcano was quarried in the first half of the 20th century. A carpark for the Auckland College of Education was built on-top of the site.

Geologist E. J. Searle proposed the name Epsom Avenue for the volcano in 1965.

== Bibliography ==
- City of Volcanoes: A geology of Auckland - Searle, Ernest J.; revised by Mayhill, R.D.; Longman Paul, 1981. First published 1964. ISBN 0-582-71784-1.
- Volcanoes of Auckland: A Field Guide. Hayward, B.W.; Auckland University Press, 2019, 335 pp. ISBN 0-582-71784-1.
