= Greenlane Clinical Centre =

Public hospital in Auckland, New Zealand

- Te Whatu Ora
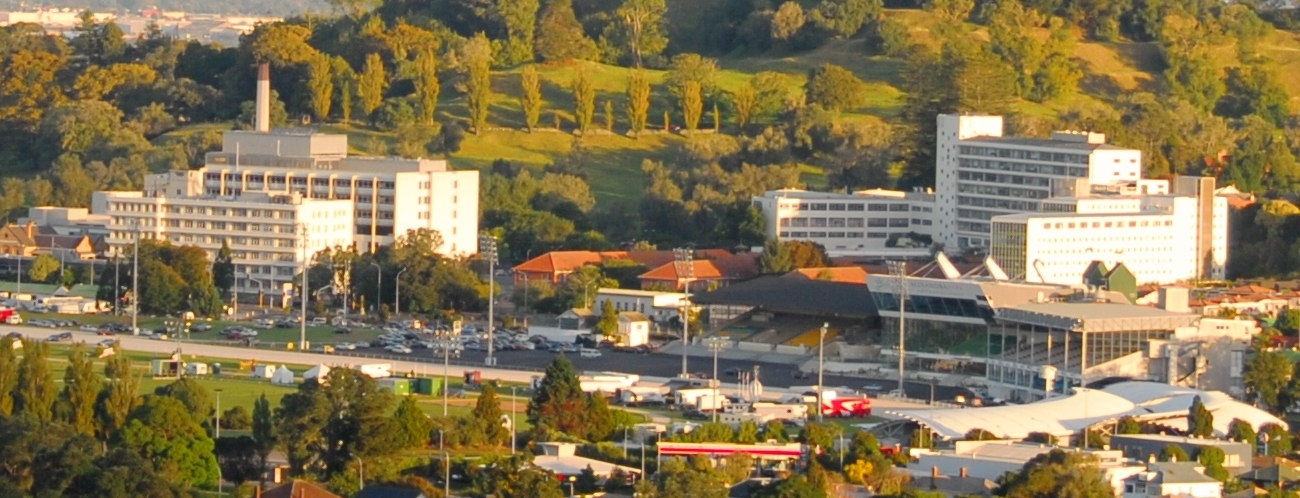
- Aerial view of Greenlane Clinical Centre

Geography
- Location: Greenlane, Auckland, New Zealand
- Coordinates: 36.893429°S 174.780280°E

Organisation
- Type: General
- Affiliated university: University of Auckland

Services
- Emergency department: No

History
- Former names: Costley Home for the Aged Poor, National Women's Hospital, Green Lane Hospital
- Opened: 1890

Links
- Website: www.adhb.health.nz
- Lists: Hospitals in New Zealand

Greenlane Clinical Centre is a public hospital in Greenlane, Auckland, located on Green Lane West, near Cornwall Park. The hospital is administered by the Northern division of Te Whatu Ora providing outpatient and day surgery services to the Auckland Region. The healthcare facilities at Greenlane have seen many notable developments in New Zealand's healthcare.

== History ==
=== Preceding institutions ===
The centre was founded as the Costley Home for the Aged Poor in 1890, built with funds bequeathed by Edward Costley. Run by the Auckland Charitable Aid Trust, it had an occupancy of about 175 patients. An Infirmary Ward for the Incurables, now known as building 5, was opened by Minister for Health George Fowlds in 1907. The site was renamed Auckland Infirmary in 1924. In 2007 Auckland District Health Board applied for resource consent to demolish building 5, making way for more parking and a new building. Heritage groups opposed the proposal, with the Environment Court finding in their favour. Building 5 was granted category one status by Heritage New Zealand in 2010.

In 1942 the site became a general hospital with the completion of a Main Building in 1943. Greenlane became internationally renowned for heart surgery under Sir Douglas Robb and Sir Brian Barratt-Boyes, seeing the first open heart operation in the country in 1958, and the second heart valve replacement in the world in 1962.

=== Greenlane Clinical Centre ===
All inpatient services were moved to the Auckland City Hospital in 2003 and Green Lane Hospital became the Greenlane Clinical Centre treating outpatients and day surgery cases.

== Facilities ==
In May 2023, the services provided by Te Whatu Ora at Green Lane Clinical Centre were focused on community, ambulatory & mental health services. These services included:

- rheumatology
- pain services
- sexual health
- diabetes management
- dermatology
- oral health
- immunology
- audiology
- allied health
- mental health

== Gallery ==
Green Lane Hospital

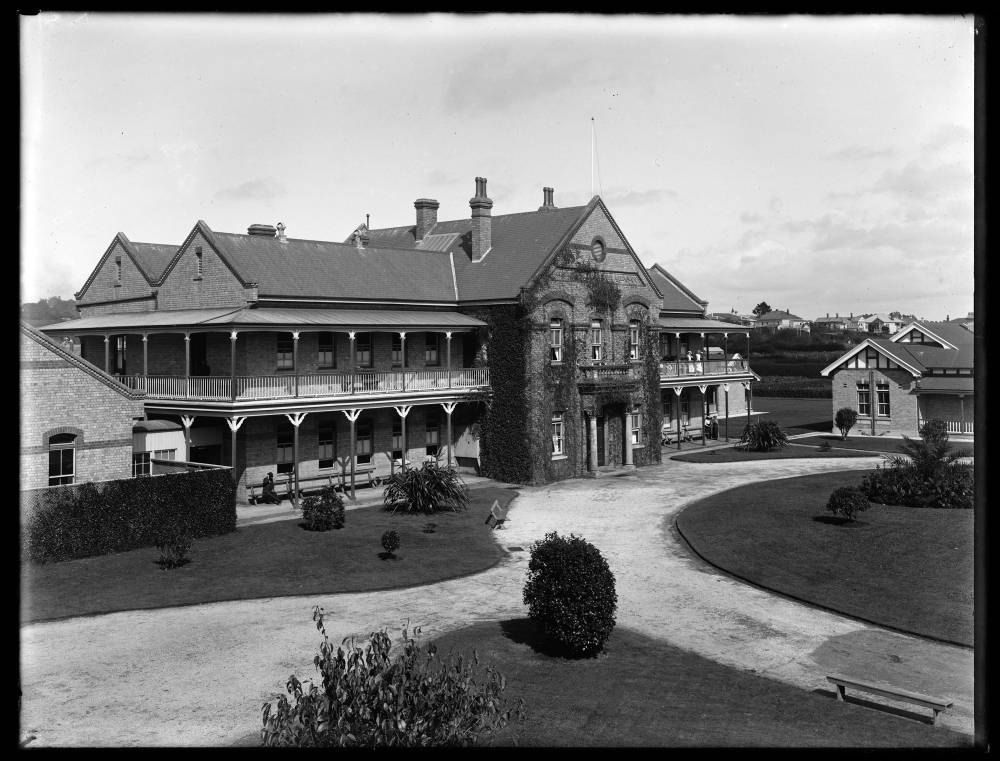
Costley Home for the Aged Poor, 1918

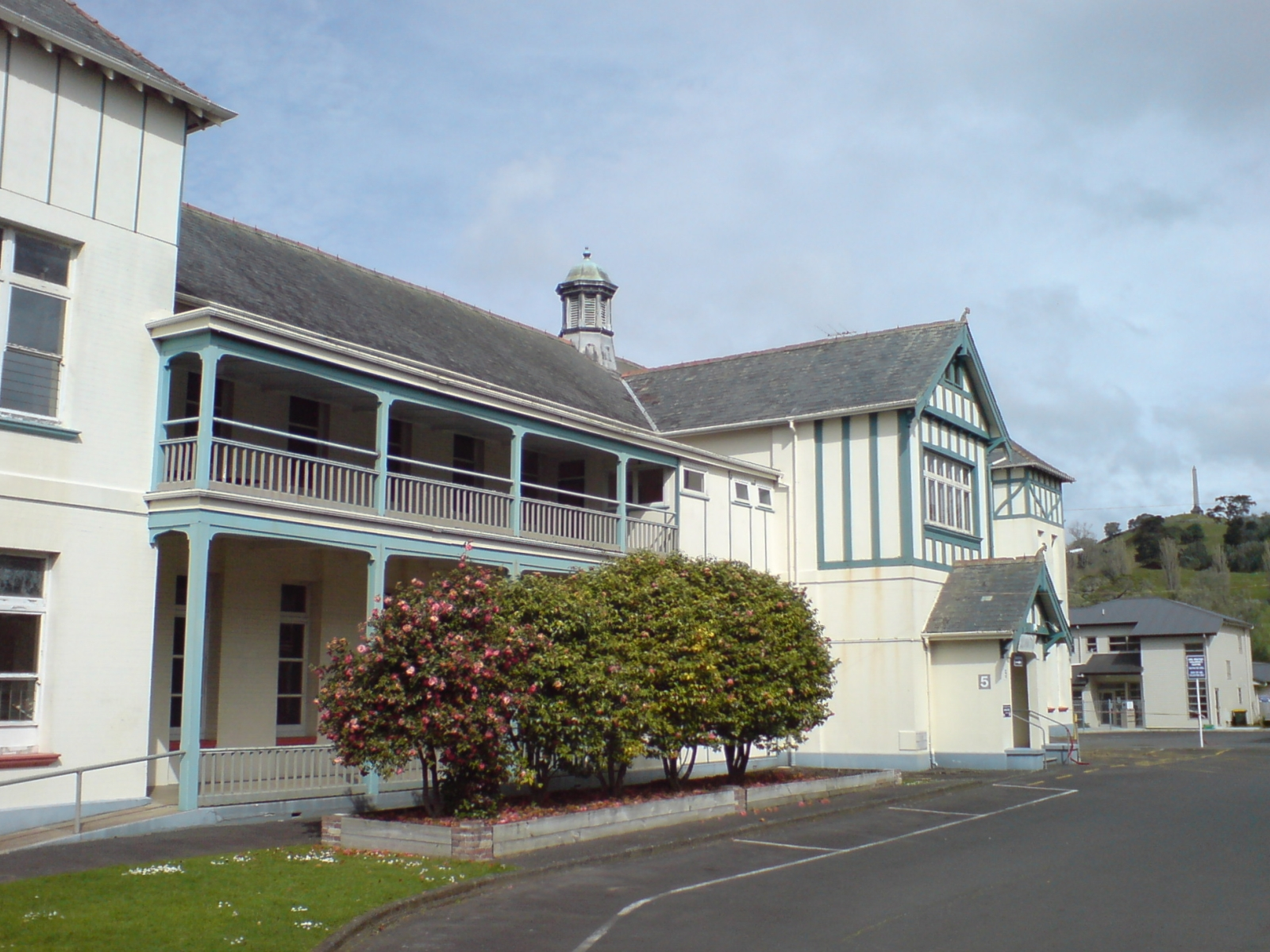
Greenlane Clinical Centre, building 5, the Infirmary Ward for the Incurables, built 1907

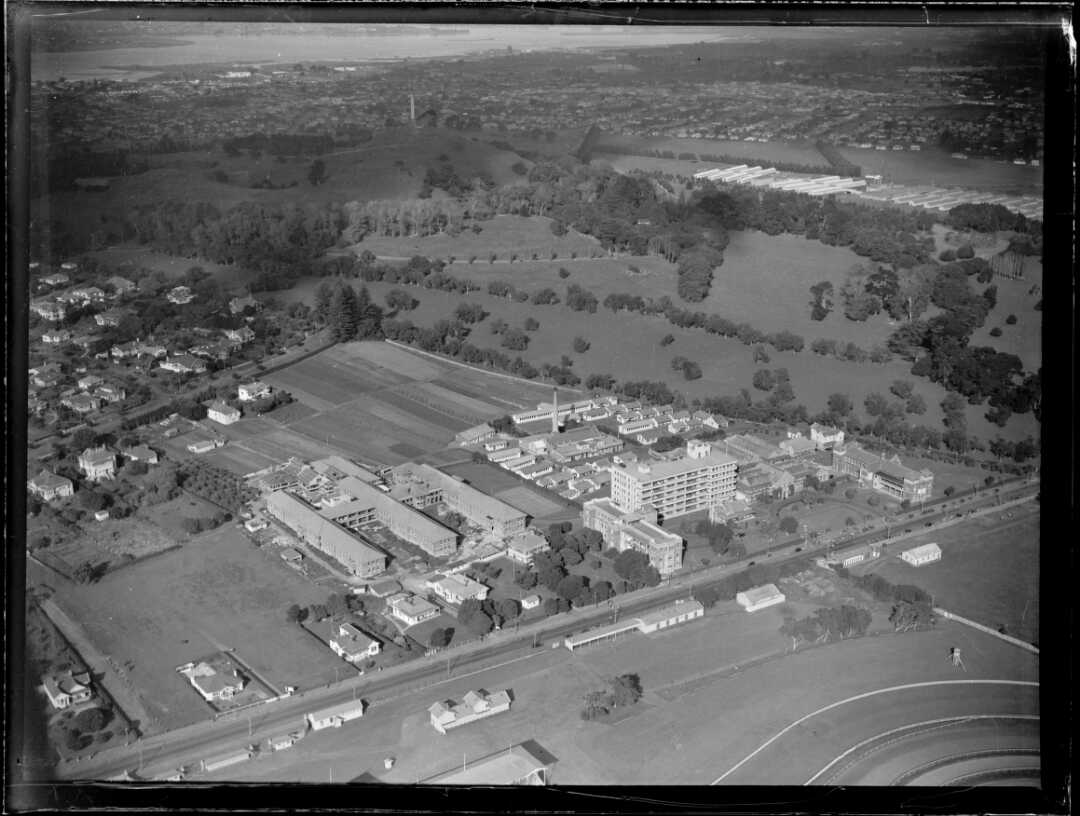
Green Lane Hospital, 1946
