= Alan Kerr (doctor) =

New Zealand doctor (born 1934/1935)

Alan Kerr CNZM
- Born: Alan Ronald Kerr; 1934 or 1935 (age 91); East Tākaka, New Zealand
- Education: University of Otago
- Occupation: Cardiac surgeon
- Spouse: Hazel Taylor (m. 1960)
- Relatives: Roger Kerr (brother)
- Awards: Senior New Zealander of the Year (2026)

Alan Ronald Kerr CNZM (born 1934 or 1935) is a New Zealand cardiac surgeon who, after his career at Green Lane Hospital, spent almost twenty years volunteering in Palestine where he operated on paediatric heart patients and trained Palestinian surgeons. Kerr and his wife Hazel were named joint Senior New Zealander of the Year for 2026.

== Early life and family ==
Kerr was born in East Tākaka in 1934 or 1935, the son of Rona Kerr (née Cross) and David Ronald Kerr. His younger brother was Roger Kerr. Alan Kerr was educated at Nelson College from 1946 to 1951, and went on to study at the University of Otago, graduating Bachelor of Medicine, Bachelor of Surgery, in 1957.

In 1960, Kerr married Elizabeth Hazel Taylor at the Presbyterian church in the Wellington suburb of Seatoun.

== Career ==
After three years at Wellington Hospital, Kerr moved to work at Green Lane Hospital in 1961 as a research fellow in the Surgical Development Laboratory where he researched blood flow in the bronchial arteries and in bypass procedures. He then became a registrar working at Green Lane, Auckland and Middlemore Hospitals. In 1967 he went to Alabama to work in the University of Alabama Medical Center under Dr John Kirklin. He returned to a surgical position at Green Lane in 1969. He worked in the cardio-thoracic surgical team with Brian Barratt-Boyes and was one of the surgeons who performed the first heart-lung bypass operation at Green Lane in 1958.

Staff from Green Lane hosted and trained doctors from overseas and visited foreign hospitals In 1981, Kerr visited hospitals in New Delhi and Madras (now Chennai) doing cardiopulmonary bypass operations and delivering training in cardiac surgery.

A special supplement of the New Zealand Medical Journal, published in 2001, honoured the work of Kerr and five other cardiology and cardiothoracic consultants: Trevor Agnew, Pat Clarkson, John Mercer, John Neutze, and Toby Whitlock.

== Work in Palestine ==
In 2001, Kerr joined the Palestine Children's Relief Fund volunteering his services as a paediatric cardiac surgeon. Between 2001 and 2018, he made over 40 trips to the West Bank and Gaza working in Makassed Hospital in East Jerusalem, Palestine Medical Complex in Ramallah and Al Shifa Hospital in Gaza. He was accompanied by teams from Green Lane and Auckland's Starship Hospital. As well as doing surgery, he trained other surgeons and developed the paediatric surgery programme at Makassed. The teams saved the lives of 800 children. In 2006, they set up a charity Health Services for Palestinian Children to raise money to send medical teams to Palestine.

In 2007, film maker Paula Whetu Jones commenced filming Kerr and his wife Hazel on their trips to Palestine. While Kerr was working, Hazel worked with children in refugee camps and at a school for deaf children teaching art and drama. The film The Doctor's Wife was released in 2025.

== Honours and awards ==
Kerr was appointed a Companion of the New Zealand Order of Merit, for services to cardiothoracic surgery, in the 1997 New Year Honours. He received the Palestine Medal of Honor in 2011 from Mahmoud Abbas, the Palestinian president. In 2026, Kerr and his wife Hazel received the Senior New Zealanders of the Year award.

Kerr is a Fellow of the Royal Australasian College of Surgeons.

== Selected works ==
- Wong, Sharon H.; Finucane, Kirsten; Kerr, Alan R.; O’Donnell, Clare; West, Teena; Gentles, Thomas L. (2008). "Cardiac Outcome up to 15 Years After the Arterial Switch Operation". Heart, Lung and Circulation. 17 (1): 48–53. doi:10.1016/j.hlc.2007.06.523. PMID 17669687.
- Solomon, Neville A. G.; Finucane, Kirsten A.; Skinner, Jonathan R.; Kerr, Alan (1 June 2005). "Mild Supravalvular Aortic Stenosis With Left Coronary Obstruction in a Neonate". The Annals of Thoracic Surgery. 79 (6): 2153–2155. doi:10.1016/j.athoracsur.2003.12.064. ISSN 0003-4975. PMID 15919336.
- Armishaw J, Gentles TL, Calder AL, Raudkivi PJ, Kerr AR. Transposition of the great arteries: operative outcome in the current era. N Z Med J. 2000 Nov 10;113(1121):456-9. PMID: 11194751.
- North, Robyn A.; Sadler, Lynn; Stewart, Alistair W.; McCowan, Lesley M.E.; Kerr, Alan R.; White, Harvey D. (25 May 1999). "Long-Term Survival and Valve-Related Complications in Young Women With Cardiac Valve Replacements". Circulation. 99 (20): 2669–2676. doi:10.1161/01.CIR.99.20.2669. ISSN 0009-7322. PMID 10338461.
- Mathison, Megumi; Whitfield, Carol; Haydock, David A.; Kerr, Alan R. (1996). "Risk Factors in Heart Transplantation. A Statistical Study of New Zealand Cases.: A Statistical Study of New Zealand Cases". Japanese Heart Journal. 37 (2): 243–249. doi:10.1536/ihj.37.243. ISSN 0021-4868. PMID 8676551.
- French, John K.; Scott, Douglas S.; Whitlock, Ralph M.L.; Nisbet, Heather D.; Vedder, Margaret; Kerr, Alan R.; Smith, Warren M. (1995). "Late Outcome After Coronary Artery Bypass Graft Surgery in Patients". Circulation. 92 (9): 14–19. doi:10.1161/01.CIR.92.9.14. ISSN 0009-7322. PMID 7586398.
- Murthy, Kona S.; Scott, Douglas; Wilson, Nigel; Raudkivi, Peter; Kerr, Alan (1 July 1994). "Surgical repair of fallot's tetralogy at Green Lane hospital: Results from the current era". The Asia Pacific Journal of Thoracic & Cardiovascular Surgery. 3 (1): 47. doi:10.1016/1324-2881(94)90078-7. ISSN 1324-2881.
- Ruygrok PN, Barratt-Boyes BG, Agnew TM, Coverdale HA, Kerr AR, Whitlock RM. Aortic valve replacement in the elderly. J Heart Valve Dis. 1993 Sep;2(5):550-7. PMID: 8269166.
- Osaka, S.; Barratt-Boyes, B. G.; Brandt, P. W. T.; Kerr, A. R.; Whitlock, R. M. L. (1988). "EARLY AND LATE RESULTS OF RE-OPERATION FOR CORONARY ARTERY DISEASE: A 13-YEAR EXPERIENCE". Australian and New Zealand Journal of Surgery. 58 (7): 537–541. doi:10.1111/j.1445-2197.1988.tb06190.x. ISSN 0004-8682. PMID 3267082.
- Kerr AR, Roche AH, Rutherford JD, Graham KJ. Coronary artery surgery. N Z Med J. 1984 Apr 25;97(754):274. PMID: 6587217.
- Norris, R M; Agnew, T M; Brandt, P W; Graham, K J; Hill, D G; Kerr, A R; Lowe, J B; Roche, A H; Whitlock, R M; Barratt-Boyes, B G (1981). "Coronary surgery after recurrent myocardial infarction: progress of a trial comparing surgical with nonsurgical management for asymptomatic patients with advanced coronary disease". Circulation. 63 (4): 785–792. doi:10.1161/01.CIR.63.4.785. ISSN 0009-7322. PMID 7471334.
- Clarke, C. Peter; Kerr, Alan R.; Cole, David S. (1967). "The Place of Surgery in the Prophylaxis of Pulmonary Embolism". Medical Journal of Australia. 1 (8): 364–367. doi:10.5694/j.1326-5377.1967.tb21274.x. ISSN 0025-729X. PMID 6021232.
