= Greenlane =

- Suburb
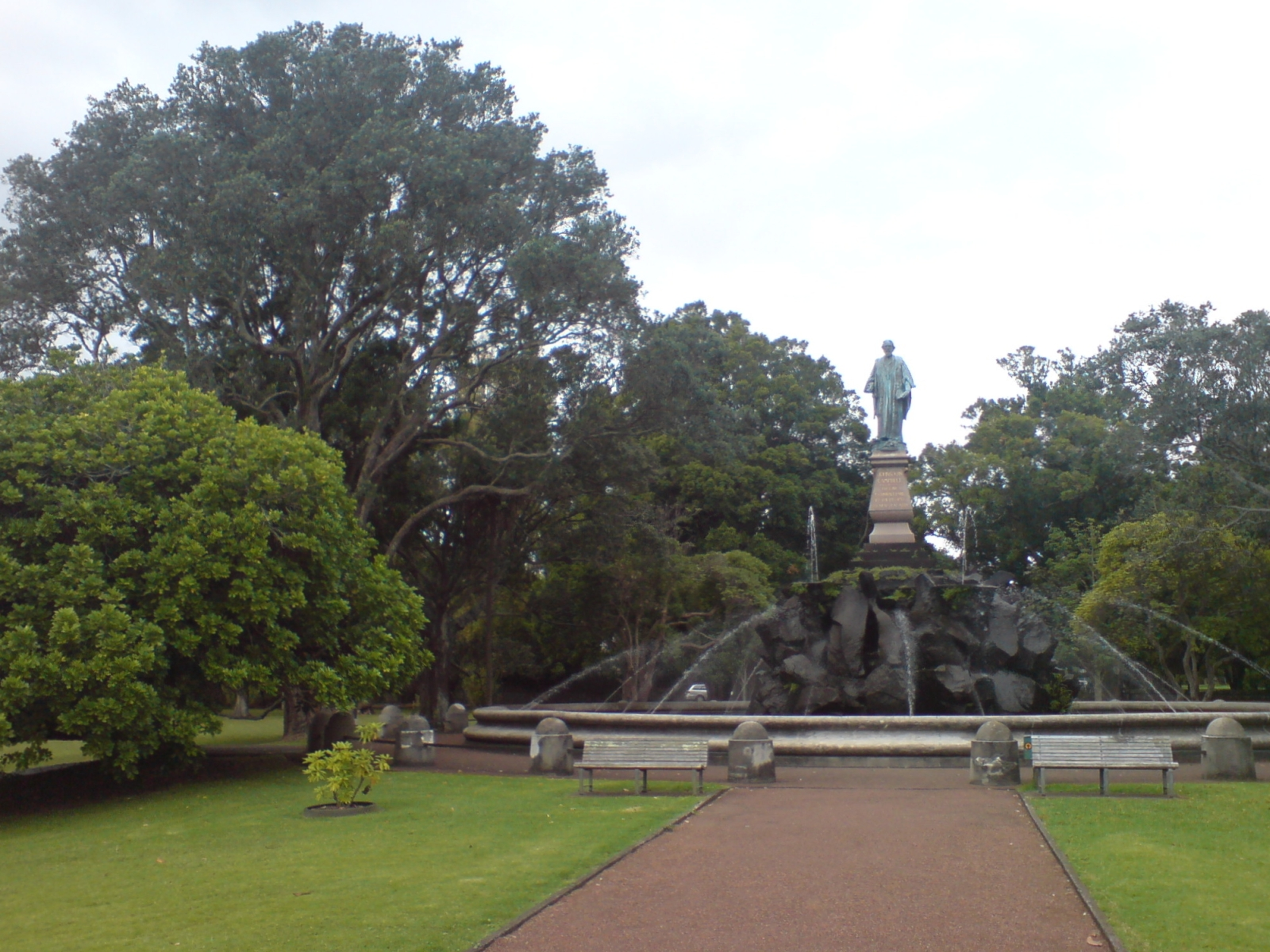
- The Logan Campbell statue at the western end of the suburb
- Interactive map of Greenlane
- Coordinates: 36°53′29″S 174°47′34″E
- Country: New Zealand
- City: Auckland
- Local authority: Auckland Council
- Electoral ward: Albert-Eden-Puketāpapa ward; Maungakiekie-Tāmaki ward
- Local board: Albert-Eden Local Board; Maungakiekie-Tāmaki Local Board

Area
  - Land: 200 ha (490 acres)

Population (June 2025)
  - Total: 8,620
  - Density: 4,300/km^{2} (11,000/sq mi)
- Train stations: Greenlane Railway Station
- Hospitals: Greenlane Clinical Centre, Green Lane Hospital (closed)

	Newmarket
Epsom	Greenlane	Remuera
Royal Oak	One Tree Hill	Ellerslie

Greenlane is a central isthmus suburb in Auckland, New Zealand. It is bounded by Epsom to the west, Newmarket to the north, Remuera to the east and One Tree Hill to the south.

The Greenlane shops are situated at the intersection of Great South Road and Green Lane West. On the northern side of Green Lane West are located the Alexandra Park Raceway, the Auckland Showgrounds and the Campbell Park Tennis Club; on the southern side is Greenlane Clinical Centre, Cornwall Park, Cornwall Cricket Club, and Maungakiekie / One Tree Hill and its park.

Within Auckland, the suburb is best-known for Cornwall Park, the Greenlane Clinical Centre, which is a large hospital complex, the Auckland Showgrounds, car yards and the Alexandra Park racecourse.

The suburb itself is one word (Greenlane), whereas the thoroughfare is two (Green Lane).

== History ==
From the 1840s until the 1890s Greenlane was noted for its rich pasture land which supported both dairy herds and grain crops. Initially large country houses and farms dotted the landscape but from the 1890s onwards suburban development spread southwards from Newmarket across the fields of Epsom. Dr John Logan Campbell gifted part of his One Tree Hill farm to the city as a public park in 1901, coinciding with a visit from the Duke of Cornwall, after whom the park was named. Since the early 1990s there has been a considerable amount of property development, with clutches of townhouses built among the traditional tracts of villas and bungalows in some parts of Greenlane.

The broad, flat pastureland here at the intersection of Green Lane and Manukau Roads was used for sporting events from the 1850s onwards but the Alexandra Park Raceway and Auckland Showgrounds were only formally established around 1900. The Alexandra Park Raceway was named after the Duchess of Cornwall (later Queen Alexandra), and specialises in trotting races. The showgrounds have been the site of many trade exhibitions and agricultural shows, especially the annual Auckland Royal Easter Show and from 2022 the Lantern Festival makes its home here.

Adjacent to Alexandra Park was the Auckland Electric Tram Company tram depot. Established in 1902, the tram company had storage sheds and an administrative office block built here, as it was halfway between Auckland and Onehunga. The system was torn out in 1956 but the sheds remained here until the late 1970s when they were replaced by an office park. The administrative block survives as a restaurant.

The Greenlane shops were developed in conjunction with the tram line in the early 20th century, servicing the needs of the local community and visitors to the raceway, showgrounds, hospital, and parks. The make up of local businesses has changed over the years. In the past it was dominated by horseracing and pharmacies, though today is a centre for the motor vehicle trades. There are also a number of restaurants in the area. The elegant 1920s Lido Cinema still operates, one of the few stand alone suburban cinemas in Auckland to do so. The train station tucked next to the motorway makes for a swift commute to the CBD or south.

== Demographics ==
Greenlane covers 2.00 km^{2} (0.77 sq mi) and had an estimated population of 8,620 as of June 2025, with a population density of 4,310 people per km^{2}.

Historical population
Year	Pop.	±% p.a.
2006	7,074	—
2013	7,542	+0.92%
2018	8,010	+1.21%
2023	7,956	−0.14%

Greenlane had a population of 7,956 in the 2023 New Zealand census, a decrease of 54 people (−0.7%) since the 2018 census, and an increase of 414 people (5.5%) since the 2013 census. There were 3,822 males, 4,101 females and 33 people of other genders in 2,754 dwellings. 4.6% of people identified as LGBTIQ+. The median age was 35.9 years (compared with 38.1 years nationally). There were 1,248 people (15.7%) aged under 15 years, 1,917 (24.1%) aged 15 to 29, 3,582 (45.0%) aged 30 to 64, and 1,212 (15.2%) aged 65 or older.

People could identify as more than one ethnicity. The results were 50.3% European (Pākehā); 6.8% Māori; 7.1% Pasifika; 42.0% Asian; 3.5% Middle Eastern, Latin American and African New Zealanders (MELAA); and 1.6% other, which includes people giving their ethnicity as "New Zealander". English was spoken by 92.8%, Māori language by 1.3%, Samoan by 1.2%, and other languages by 36.5%. No language could be spoken by 1.9% (e.g. too young to talk). New Zealand Sign Language was known by 0.3%. The percentage of people born overseas was 46.2, compared with 28.8% nationally.

Religious affiliations were 32.4% Christian, 4.1% Hindu, 2.0% Islam, 0.4% Māori religious beliefs, 3.6% Buddhist, 0.3% New Age, 0.2% Jewish, and 1.4% other religions. People who answered that they had no religion were 51.2%, and 4.5% of people did not answer the census question.

Of those at least 15 years old, 3,207 (47.8%) people had a bachelor's or higher degree, 2,313 (34.5%) had a post-high school certificate or diploma, and 1,191 (17.8%) people exclusively held high school qualifications. The median income was $52,100, compared with $41,500 nationally. 1,266 people (18.9%) earned over $100,000 compared to 12.1% nationally. The employment status of those at least 15 was that 3,702 (55.2%) people were employed full-time, 831 (12.4%) were part-time, and 180 (2.7%) were unemployed.

Individual statistical areas
Name	Area (km^{2})	Population	Density (per km^{2})	Dwellings	Median age	Median income
Greenlane North	0.53	2,025	3,821	648	34.8 years	$48,700
Greenlane Central	0.62	2,190	3,532	717	35.7 years	$59,700
Greenlane South	0.85	3,741	4,401	1,386	36.5 years	$49,500
New Zealand					38.1 years	$41,500

== Hospitals ==
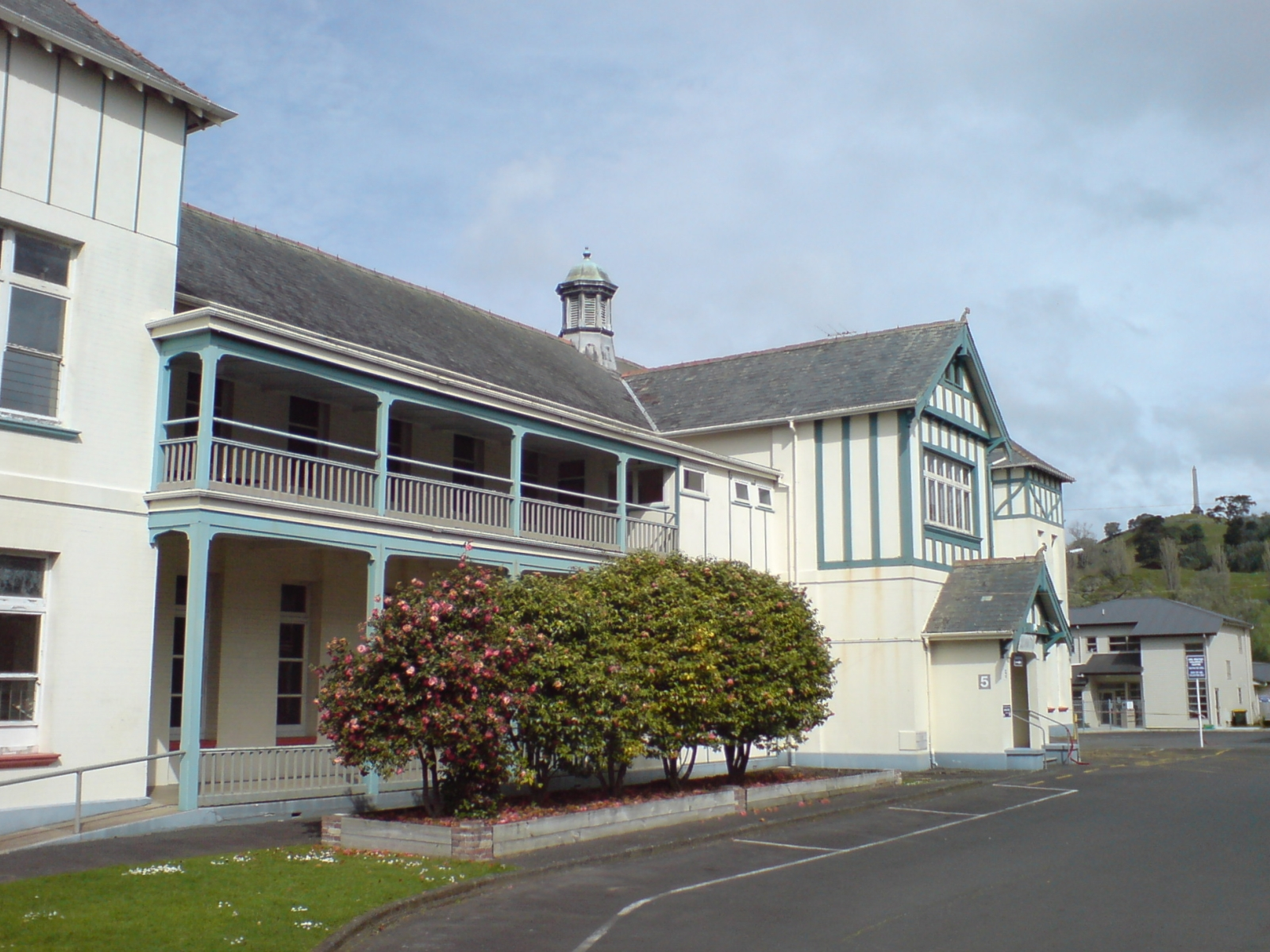
An older part of the Greenlane Medical Centre

Greenlane Clinical Centre is one of the major hospital facilities within the jurisdiction of Te Whatu Ora Northern Region (formerly the Auckland District Health Board). The centre is a complex of several buildings which was Green Lane Hospital, a national and international cardiology and cardiothoracic hospital. The earliest building on the site dates from 1890 and was donated by Edward Costley, an Auckland businessman who bequeathed money for many charitable works.

The National Women's Hospital building dates from 1964 and was an icon of modernity in its day.

== Cornwall Park ==
During World War II large numbers of prefabricated buildings were constructed in the eastern part of Cornwall Park in readiness for wounded and sick American soldiers to be evacuated from Guadalcanal. Cornwall Hospital was used during the 1950s and 60s as a geriatric hospital and maternity wards until the adjacent National Women's Hospital was fully open. The buildings were progressively reduced in number in the 1960s although some remained standing empty until the mid 1970s. Now only the US flag pole and a plaque remain as a memorial to the wartime usage. The park is a thriving centre for socialising, photography and relaxation. Within the park grounds there is a licensed bistro, a cafe and coffee truck as well as a creamery selling icecreams and waffles. Cornwall Park Trust who manage this private park, put on free music concerts and educational nature workshops for the community. The iconic obelisk on top of Maungakiekie/One Tree Hill is visible night and day, thanks to the red light on its tip.

== Politics ==
Greenlane falls across two parliamentary electorates:

- Epsom, represented by Member of Parliament David Seymour of the ACT Party
- Maungakiekie, represented by Member of Parliament Greg Fleming of the National Party

Since the 2010 amalgamation of councils, Greenlane also falls across two wards for electing local boards of the Auckland Council, and as of the 2022 local elections, the representation is as follows:

- Albert-Eden-Puketāpapa ward
- Maungakiekie-Tāmaki ward

== Education ==
Cornwall Park District School is a coeducational contributing primary school (years 1–6) with a roll of 676 as of July 2026. And Remuera Intermediate is also within zone.

The area is served by state secondary schools including Auckland Grammar School, Epsom Girls Grammar School, One Tree Hill College and St Peter's College.
