= New Zealand Initiative =

Public policy think tank

The New Zealand Initiative
- Formation: April 1, 2012; 14 years ago
- Type: Think tank
- Legal status: Limited company
- Location: Wellington, New Zealand
- Executive Director: Oliver Hartwich
- Chairman: Roger Partridge
- Website: www.nzinitiative.org.nz

The New Zealand Initiative is a pro-free-market public-policy think tank and business membership organisation in New Zealand. It was formed in 2012 by merger of the New Zealand Business Roundtable (NZBR) and the New Zealand Institute. The Initiative’s main areas of focus include economic policy, housing, education, local government, welfare, immigration and fisheries.

== Membership ==
Economist Oliver Hartwich has been the executive director of The Initiative since its formation in 2012, and local writer and media commentator Eric Crampton is currently Chief Economist at the organisation. NZME's independent chair Barbara Joan Chapman (formerly the Chief Executive Officer and Managing Director of ASB Bank) has been a director of the NZ Initiative since 2017. Chapman is also Deputy Chair of the NZ Initiative, is currently the chairperson of Genesis Energy Limited, holds an independent directorship on the board of Fletcher Building Limited, and holds a seat on the Reserve Bank Act Review Panel.

== Background ==
The New Zealand Initiative's predecessor organisations were both business membership organisations. The Wellington-based Business Roundtable, founded by Roger Kerr in 1986, was among the main proponents of New Zealand's neoliberal economic reforms of the 1980s and 1990s. To that end, the Business Roundtable produced a wide range of publications (books, reports, submissions) and undertook other activities that informed and influenced an often controversial public debate.

The Business Roundtable began in the mid-1970s as a loose coalition of Auckland business leaders, becoming a more formal and cohesive organisation under Kerr's leadership. Ronald Trotter and Douglas Myers were Chairman and vice-Chairman respectively of the Business Roundtable in its early stages, until Myers became chairman in 1990. A majority of New Zealand's corporations sat on the roundtable. As of 1989, the twenty-seven member companies comprised eighty-six percent of share market capitalisation.

The Business Roundtable lobbied extensively for labour market reform. It called for a flexible labour market under individual employment contracts to curb New Zealand's high levels of unemployment. Trotter wrote that the inflexible labour market, underpinned by collective union contracts, was a "major reason" behind New Zealand's general economic malaise.

The Business Roundtable were hostile to unions, stating that compulsory union membership and their contracts forced workers and employers into terms of employment "against their will." The privileged conferred by collective agreements benefitted a small group of well-to-do workers and union officials, while disadvantaging women and minorities. Individual employment contracts, annual awards, voluntary unionism, and an end to the union monopoly over bargaining were essential to maximising economic and employment growth. The Business Roundtable also opposed the minimum wage as a distortion which increased the cost of consumer goods and locked ‘unskilled’ workers out of work.

The Business Roundtable exercised a great deal of influence over the neoliberal reforms of the 1980s and 1990s. Former director of Equiticorp Alan Hawkins donated $250,000 to Roger Douglas himself, which he described as a reward for deregulations that aided Equiticorp. Its members donations to the Fourth Labour Government amounted to $3 million. While National was in opposition in March 1989, Myers arranged a panel of experts to consult Bill Birch on labour market reform. Ruth Richardson lauded the Business Roundtable's contributions to policy making, singling out member David Richwhite for "(pulling) his weight very substantially in the public policy debate."

The New Zealand Institute was established in Auckland in 2004. Like the Business Roundtable, the New Zealand Institute was a business membership organisation that operated as a think tank, albeit with a more centrist political tilt. Some members of the Business Roundtable moved their support to the New Zealand Institute.

By 2011, according to New Zealand Institute chairman Tony Carter, the organisation lacked scale. Carter approached Business Roundtable chairman Roger Partridge and raised the possibility of merging the two organisations. The merger discussions were successful and the New Zealand Initiative was launched in April 2012, with Partridge and Carter as co-chairs. Hartwich was appointed its first executive director.

== Organisation ==
The New Zealand Initiative is based in Wellington. It is a limited company, governed by a board of directors under a constitution. It is one of the three biggest think tanks in New Zealand, the other two being the New Zealand Institute of Economic Research (NZIER) and Business and Economic Research (BERL).

The membership of The New Zealand Initiative comprises about 70 members, mainly large New Zealand companies. According to the Initiative’s Annual Report 2016, the combined revenue of its members equals a quarter of the New Zealand economy.

=== Disgraced chief editor ===
The chief editor of the New Zealand Initiative, Nathan Smith, resigned from the position in December 2020 after news reports emerged that he was the author of a far-right blog Likebulb. In this blog he said, amongst other things, that the media controls people's thoughts and authors lengthy posts tying together "Muslim rape gangs" and incel ideology. He also discussed the Telford child sexual exploitation scandal. His concern was not that girls were being sexually assaulted but that society prevents him from engaging in the same behaviour. Hartwich said that these views were "abhorrent" and had no place at the New Zealand Initiative.

The New Zealand Initiative, together with the New Zealand Taxpayers' Union, is a member of the Atlas Network, a global conservatarian group.

== Approach ==
On its website, The New Zealand Initiative says its mission is "to help create a competitive, open and dynamic economy and a free, prosperous, fair, and cohesive society" and describes itself as "strictly non-partisan." It takes a more free-market perspective than the NZIER or BERL.

Apart from its research activities, the New Zealand Initiative hosts a range of events. These include public forums, panel discussions, an annual debating tournament for university students, as well as events for its members. In May 2017, The Initiative organised a study tour of Switzerland for more than 30 senior New Zealand business leaders.

Among the speakers hosted by The New Zealand Initiative are New Zealand Prime Ministers John Key and Bill English, Leaders of the Labour Party David Shearer, David Cunliffe and Andrew Little, former Australian Prime Minister John Howard, former British Trade Secretary Peter Lilley as well as members of all parties represented in the New Zealand Parliament.

The New Zealand Initiative released Manifesto 2017: What the next New Zealand Government Should Do, an overview of its policy recommendations from its first five years, in the lead-up to the 2017 general election.

== Policy positions and public reception ==
=== Education ===
In July 2017, the New Zealand Initiative has called for the performance measurement and management of teachers in New Zealand schools, a proposal that was cautiously welcomed by Minister of Education Nikki Kaye and rejected by the teachers' union Post Primary Teachers' Association (PPTA). In an earlier report, the Initiative had criticised the New Zealand government for introducing new teaching methods in mathematics that led to worsening numeracy of students. In September 2022, the NZ Initiative asked the Ministry of Education to provide evidence that large, open-plan classrooms helped improve students' learning.

=== Housing and local government ===
According to business columnist Pattrick Smellie in 2017, the New Zealand Initiative's main contribution to the housing debate was to point out the factors that were limiting housing supply: Along with high immigration, a sub-scale building industry, and dysfunctional planning law, the incentives for local councils to discourage rather than compete for new citizens was a big part of why Auckland's housing crisis existed. The NZ Initiative had been pointing out these growth-limiting settings almost since its creation five years earlier.

In November 2015, Hartwich and the Labour Party's housing spokesperson Phil Twyford published a joint opinion piece advocating the abolition of height and density controls, infrastructure bonds, and an end to the rural-urban boundary. The article was interpreted as a shift from traditional Labour positions on land-use planning and regarded by international commentators as a sign of a new emerging consensus on housing policy.

The New Zealand Initiative's proposal to establish Special Economic Zones across New Zealand was supported by Wellington Mayor Justin Lester and Malcolm Alexander, chief executive of Local Government New Zealand. Government papers released under the Official Information Act revealed that cabinet ministers were considering the Initiative's proposals.

In a 2013 Initiative report, co-authored by former cabinet minister Michael Bassett, the Initiative proposed funding residential infrastructure through targeted rates in special purpose vehicles. The New Zealand government introduced such a scheme in July 2017 when it charged Crown Infrastructure Partners with this task.

=== Foreign direct investment ===
The New Zealand Initiative promotes the deregulation of New Zealand's restrictions on overseas investors, a position which attracted fierce criticism from New Zealand First leader Winston Peters.

=== Fisheries management ===
Based on comparative research, the Initiative proposed to establish a new agency to represent recreational fishing interests, modelled on the Western Australian body Recfishwest. The proposal was rejected by fishing advocacy group LegaSea.

=== Immigration ===
In its immigration report, the New Zealand Initiative defended New Zealand's liberal immigration policy, arguing that migrants contribute positively to the economy and integrate well into New Zealand society. Winston Peters rejected the Initiative's findings as "academic gobbledygook" and attacked the Initiative for being a thinktank run by foreigners. The Labour Party's Immigration spokesperson Iain Lees-Galloway welcomed the report while criticising its alleged ignorance of migrants' infrastructure needs.

=== Social policy ===
The Initiative supported the Key/English government's 'Social Investment Approach,' including the introduction of Social Impact Bonds. It has also argued that concerns about the recent rise of economic inequality were driven by rising house prices while income inequality in New Zealand had remained constant since the 1990s.

=== Climate ===
The Initiative does not support policies other than the Emissions Trading Scheme (ETS) to reduce emissions, arguing that other policies do not reduce emissions due to the emissions cap in the ETS. It supports the current focus on net-emissions as opposed to shift in focus towards gross emissions advocated by the Climate Change Commission.

=== Parliamentary reforms ===
In late October 2025, the Initiative released a study proposing that the New Zealand Parliamentary term be extended from three to four years, that the number of Members of Parliament be raised from 120 to 170 and that the number of Cabinet members be reduced from 20 to 15. The think tank also recommended that overhang seats under the mixed member proportional system be scrapped and reforming the electoral system to address the growing number of special votes.
