= New Zealand Institute =

New Zealand Institute may refer to:

- New Zealand Institute (think tank), 2004–2012
- Royal Society Te Apārangi, called the New Zealand Institute from 1867 to 1933
