= Roger Kerr =

New Zealand businessman and economist

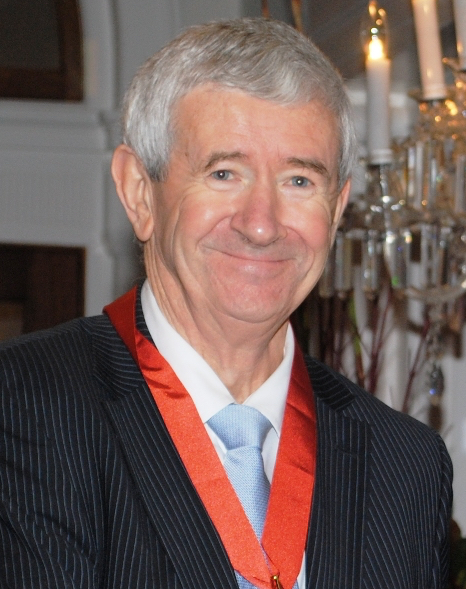
Kerr in August 2011

Roger Lawrence Kerr CNZM (17 January 1945 – 28 October 2011), a public policy and business leader, was the executive director of the New Zealand Business Roundtable, a free-market think-tank based in Wellington, New Zealand.

== Early life ==
Kerr grew up on a farm at Appleby on the South Island of New Zealand, near Nelson. Thirteen years younger than his sister Barbara and 10 years younger than his brother Alan, a paediatric heart surgeon, his arrival was a surprise for the family. He attended Appleby Primary and was one of the first students to attend Waimea College in Richmond. He was first in the country in School Certificate (New Zealand). He studied for an MA (Honours, First Class) (in his Arts degree he studied French) from the University of Canterbury. His master thesis was titled Jean-Paul Sartre : theoricien et critique de la litterature. He also obtained a BCA from Victoria University of Wellington. Roderick Deane, the senior government official and businessman, who lectured economics, said Kerr was "the most outstanding economics student I ever had when I was teaching".

== Career ==
Kerr spent much of his career in the economic policy debate in New Zealand. He was hired by Sir Ron Trotter and Sir Douglas Myers, then chairman and vice chairman of the New Zealand Business Roundtable, in 1986 as the first executive director. Kerr was a vocal proponent of Rogernomics and of policies that can be broadly characterised as free market. Before leading the Business Roundtable, he joined the New Zealand Treasury at age 32. At the Treasury he served as Director of Economics II and was part of the team of economists that authored Economic Management, the briefing paper presented to the Fourth Labor Government of New Zealand, which many regard as the blueprint for the economic reforms that followed. Kerr later became an assistant secretary.

He served as a director of the Electricity Corporation of New Zealand from 1986 to 1994, as a member of the Council of Victoria University of Wellington from 1995 to 1999, and as a member of the Group Board of Colonial Limited in Melbourne from 1996 to 2000.

Prior to Kerr's time at the Treasury he worked at Ministry of Foreign Affairs including as a diplomat in Brussels.

== Personal life ==
Kerr was married to Margaret Northcroft for over 30 years with whom he had three sons, Bernard, Nicholas and Richard, two of whom live in the United States and one of whom lives in New Zealand. The marriage to Northcroft ended in divorce. He married Catherine Isaac in January 2010. Kerr died on 28 October 2011, after battling metastatic melanoma for a year.

== Honours and awards ==
- Companion of the New Zealand Order of Merit, for services to business, in the 2011 Queen's Birthday Honours
- Alan McGregor Fellowship, 2011
- Charles Copeman Medal, 2005
- NZIER Qantas Economics Award, 2001
- Tasman Medal, 1994
