= Eric Anson =

New Zealand anaesthetist

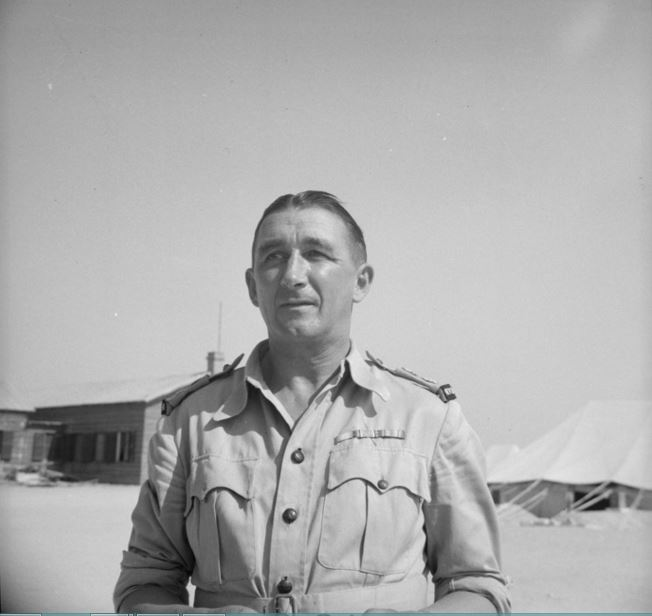
- Eric Anson
- Born: 22 November 1892; Wellington, New Zealand
- Died: 5 June 1969 (aged 76)
- Known for: Anaesthesia
- Scientific career
- Fields: Medicine

George Frederick Vernon Anson OBE (22 November 1892 – 5 June 1969), known as Eric Anson, was New Zealand's first specialist anaesthetist. He was the first President of the New Zealand Society of Anaesthetists (NZSA) and a member of the NZ Committee of the Faculty of Anaesthetists.

== Early life and education ==
Anson was the son of ship's surgeon Dr George Anson. He was educated at Wanganui Collegiate School. He went to Trinity College, Cambridge, and then to St Thomas's Hospital Medical School (now part of King's College London), from which he graduated in January 1916.

== Career ==
He served in the Royal Navy in World War I first as temporary surgeon and then in active naval service. In May 1917 he was wounded in action. After the war, he returned to New Zealand to get his medical registration before going back to Britain where he worked as an anaesthetist at Birmingham Hospital and Birmingham Children's Hospital. Returning to New Zealand in 1922 he began to practise anaesthetics as a specialty – the first New Zealander qualified to do so. He was Senior Visiting Anaesthetist at Wellington Hospital as well as having a private practice.

In the 1930s, Anson was a key figure in the New Zealand Branch of the British Medical Association serving on the Council, as Honorary Secretary and as Chairman.

During World War II, he served in the New Zealand Army Medical Corps. He was stationed in the Middle East as Medical Officer and Anaesthetist from 1940 to 1943. From 1943 to 1945 he was Commanding Officer on the hospital ship Oranje. He received an OBE for his war service.

He was the first Director of Anaesthetics for the Auckland Hospital Board, a position he held from late 1945 to 1957; there he worked across several hospitals. He introduced new techniques and drugs to replace chloroform. At Green Lane Hospital he was a pioneer in cardiothoracic anaesthesia. He was especially well regarded by Sir Douglas Robb for his ability to have his patients wake up promptly enough to say "Thank you, Mr. Robb" before leaving theatre.

In 1948, he became the first president of the New Zealand Society of Anaesthetists. In 1969 he received the R.H. Orton Medal from the Faculty of Anaesthetists of the Royal Australasian College of Surgeons. He was the first New Zealander to receive the medal.

== Legacy ==
In 1970 the Anson Memorial Foundation was set up in his memory to assist postgraduate education. Prizes are awarded by the New Zealand Society of Anaesthetists.
