= Cornwall Hospital =

- U.S. Army
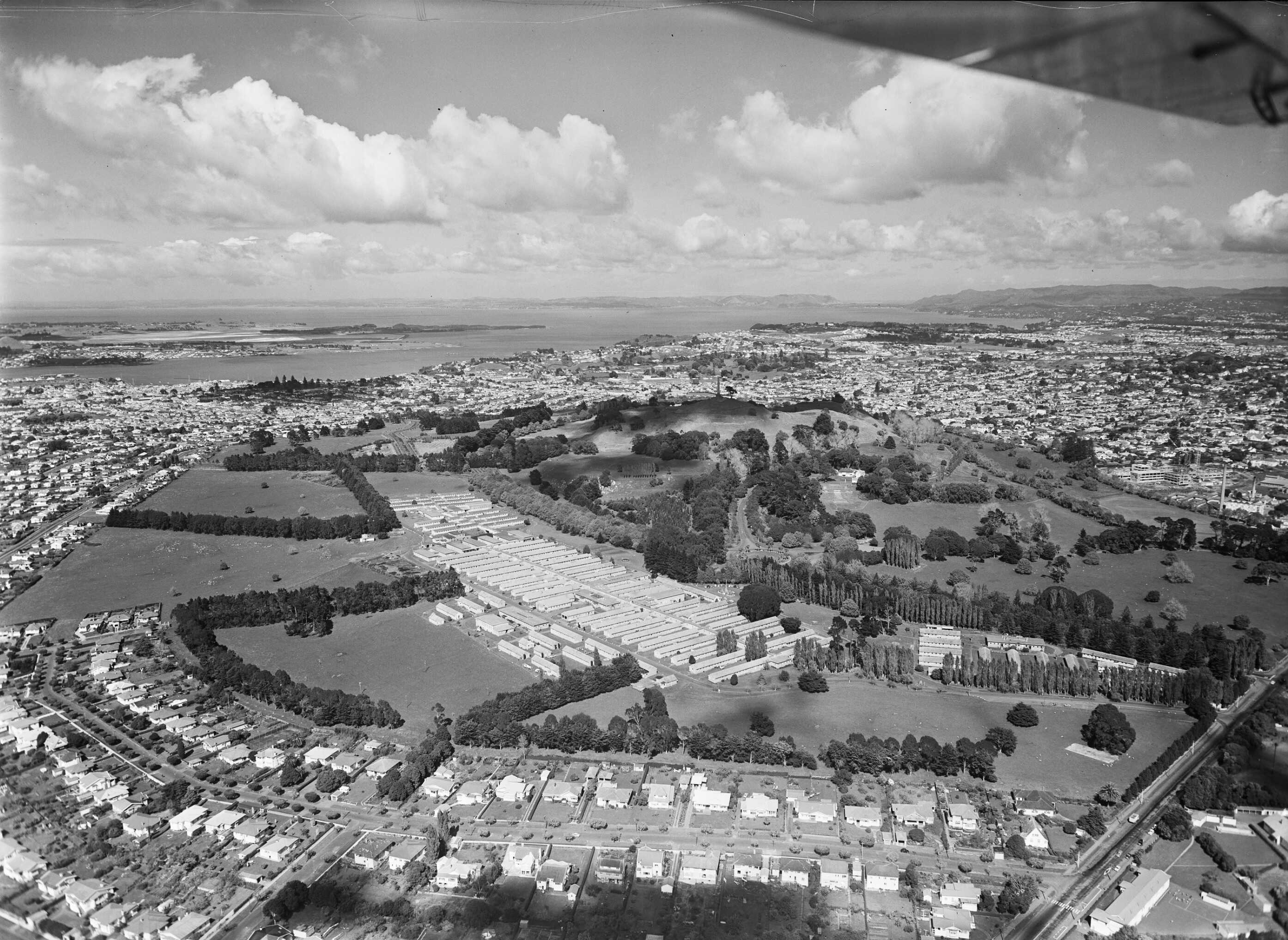
- Aerial view of Cornwall Hospital, September 1959

Geography
- Location: Cornwall Park, Auckland, New Zealand
- Coordinates: 36.89611°S 174.78816°E

Organisation
- Type: Military hospital

History
- Former name: 39th United States General Hospital
- Opened: 4 February 1943
- Closed: 1975

Links
- Lists: Hospitals in New Zealand

Cornwall Hospital was constructed in Cornwall Park, Auckland, New Zealand during World War II by the American Army and was named the 39th United States General Hospital. It accommodated casualties from the war in the Pacific. From 1945 it was leased by the Auckland Hospital Board to provide maternity and geriatric services and closed in 1975.

== History ==
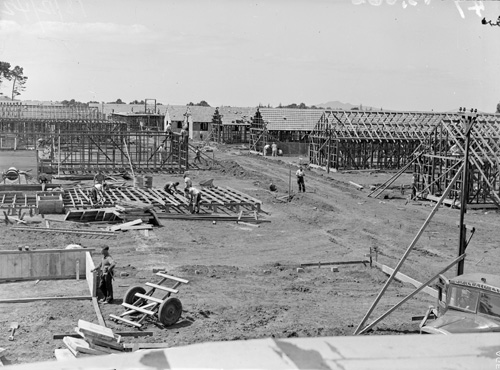
Construction of the US Army 39th General Hospital in 1942

In October 1942 the Cornwall Park Trust Board was required, under wartime regulations, to allow the United States Army to establish a hospital on 26 hectares of Cornwall Park. The 39th General Hospital was constructed quickly by Fletcher Construction, opening on 4 February 1943. The hospital consisted of 123 prefabricated buildings, 48 wards, clinic and surgery spaces, staff recreation halls and barracks. Over 1000 patients could be accommodated, and there were more than 60 doctors, 143 nurses and hundreds of auxiliary staff. Patients arrived in Auckland on hospital ships from initial treatment centres in New Caledonia, Espiritu Santo, the New Hebrides (now Vanuatu) and Fiji.

The hospital closed on 20 November 1944. A proposal that the hospital become part of the Auckland Hospital Board was the subject of discussion by the government, Auckland Hospital Board and the Cornwall Park Trust Board. The Cornwall Park trustees had already objected to using the park for anything other than war purposes. It was agreed that the 39th General Hospital buildings would be made available to the Hospital Board for a period of six years, that no further buildings could be erected, and that the government would remove all buildings at the end of six years and restore the land. The hospital board, which was short of hospital accommodation at Auckland Hospital, was also required to keep up its building programme so that proposed hospital buildings would be ready for the closure of Cornwall Hospital in December 1950.

The hospital remained open until 1975, housing maternity and geriatric units.

== Geriatric care ==
Care of geriatric patients, and paupers, in Auckland was provided from the late 19th century at Green Lane in the Costley Home for the Aged Poor. In the 1920s the buildings were expanded and the complex known as the Auckland Infirmary. After the war Cornwall Hospital became the geriatric hospital for the whole of Auckland. In 1965 the first geriatric day ward in New Zealand was opened in a modified ward attached to the main hospital complex; it provided assessment and rehabilitation including physiotherapy, occupational therapy, speech therapy and social contact. In 1975 when Cornwall Hospital closed five geriatric units were attached to each of the major Auckland hospitals. An unpublished personal account of the practice of geriatrics at Cornwall was written by Dr Newman, one of the Medical Superintendents.

== Maternity care ==
During the 1940s there were moves to establish an obstetrical and gynaecological hospital in Auckland, that could also serve as a post-graduate teaching hospital; notable doctors such as Doris Gordon, John Stallworthy, Robert Macintosh and Douglas Robb were instrumental in getting this move off the ground. In 1945 Cornwall Hospital was chosen as the site of an obstetrical unit until a new unit could be built. The first baby was born there on 9 June 1946 in the Obstetrical and Gynaecological Hospital, renamed National Women's Hospital in 1955. By 1963 it was reported in the newspapers that 50,000 births had taken place at Cornwall. In 1964 maternity and gynaecological care was transferred to the new National Women's Hospital building, adjacent to Green Lane Hospital.

== Staff ==
=== Medical superintendents ===
Dr J.J. Valentine was appointed Medical Superintendent in September 1945. He was succeeded by Dr J.A. Oddie in 1948. When Oddie left in 1949, to return to England, Dr S.C.W. Worseldine from Christchurch took up the position. Dr James Newman took over in 1952, where he established a reputation in geriatric care. He became Medical Superintendent of Green Lane Hospital in 1959. He was succeeded at Cornwall by Dr Ron Barker who was the geriatric physician responsible for setting up Cornwall's day ward.

=== Nursing staff ===
Miss V.M. Hyde was matron from 1946 to 1961 and was succeeded by Miss M.M.E. Gordon.
