= Brian Easton =

Brian Easton may refer to:

- Brian Easton (economist) (born 1943), New Zealand economist
- Brian Easton (footballer) (born 1988), Scottish footballer
