= Oliver Marc Hartwich =

German economist and media commentator (born 1975)

- Born: 8 July 1975 (age 51); Gelsenkirchen

Academic background
- Education: Ruhr University Bochum

Academic work
- Discipline: Political economics
- Institutions: The New Zealand Initiative (Executive Director)

Oliver Marc Hartwich (born 8 July 1975 in Gelsenkirchen) is a German media commentator. He is the executive director of the think tank The New Zealand Initiative in Wellington and a columnist with the online magazine Newsroom.

== Education and career ==
Hartwich graduated from Ruhr University Bochum in 2000 with a Diplom-Ökonom. He was a visiting fellow at the Law of School of University of Sydney in 2001/02 and later received a doctorate in law, also from the Ruhr University, under the supervision of professor Daniel Zimmer in 2004.

He started his career as a research assistant to Lord Oakeshott in the UK House of Lords in 2004. From January 2005 to October 2008, he worked for the conservative British think tank Policy Exchange, as a research fellow.

At Policy Exchange, Hartwich co-authored several reports on housing and planning policy with Alan W. Evans. Their report Unaffordable Housing – Fables and Myths won Prospect Magazine's prize for Publication of the Year at the British Think Tank Awards in 2005.

Some of Hartwich's policy proposals, such as the establishment of the Office for Budget Responsibility and reforms to strengthen community involvement in town planning, were taken up by the UK government under Prime Minister David Cameron.

In August 2008, Hartwich caused controversy in Britain with a report on urban regeneration Cities Unlimited, which he had edited. It allegedly called for the abolition of Northern English cities. In fact, it had made no such proposal. However, media reports to the contrary caused then British opposition leader David Cameron to suggest Hartwich should leave the UK. Some weeks later, the report received support from urban economist Ed Glaeser writing in Prospect Magazine.

Hartwich, who before the publication of Cities Unlimited had already announced his decision to take on a research role at the Centre for Independent Studies (CIS) in Sydney, moved to Australia in October 2008. At the CIS, he has published reports on local government, population growth, immigration, and international economics.

In Australia, he is best known as a media commentator on the European debt crisis and his popular weekly column for Melbourne-based online magazine Business Spectator, which he has been writing since February 2010. His articles have been published by all major newspapers and magazines in Britain, Germany, Switzerland, Australia and New Zealand, including The Sunday Telegraph, Die Welt, The Australian, The Sydney Morning Herald, Neue Zürcher Zeitung, and The Dominion Post.

On 1 May 2012, Hartwich was appointed the first executive director of the New Zealand Initiative, a public policy think tank created out of the merger of the New Zealand Institute and the New Zealand Business Roundtable.

Hartwich is a member of the Mont Pelerin Society, the Economic Society of Australia, the Foreign Correspondents' Association, and the German journalistic network Die Achse des Guten.

== Publications ==
Selection:

- Hartwich, Oliver Marc (2004), Wettbewerb, Werbung und Recht: Eine Kritik des Rechts des unlauteren Wettbewerbs aus historischer, ökonomischer und rechtvergleichender Sicht - zusammengeführt am Beispiel der vergleichenden Werbung, Herbert Utz, ISBN 978-3-8316-0343-5
- Evans, Alan W.; Hartwich, Oliver Marc (2005), Unaffordable Housing: Fables and Myths, Policy Exchange, ISBN 0-9547527-6-7
- Leunig, Tim; Swaffield, James (2008), Hartwich, Oliver Marc (ed.), Cities Unlimited: Making urban regeneration work, Policy Exchange, ISBN 978-1-906097-28-8
- Hartwich, Oliver Marc (2009), Neoliberalism: The Genesis of a Political Swearword, The Centre for Independent Studies, ISBN 978-1-86432-185-2
- Hartwich, Oliver Marc; Brown, Jessica (2010), Populate and Perish? Modelling Australia's Demographic Future, The Centre for Independent Studies, ISBN 978-1-86432-144-9
- Hartwich, Oliver Marc; Gill, Rebecca (2011), Price Drivers: Five Case Studies in How Government is Making Australia Unaffordable, The Centre for Independent Studies, ISBN 978-1-86432-133-3
