= Eva Seelye =

New Zealand anaesthetist

Eva Ruth Seelye (née Hersch; 27 May 1929 – 12 November 2010) was a New Zealand anaesthetist in the cardiothoracic surgical unit at Green Lane Hospital, Auckland from 1962 to 1985.

== Biography ==
Born in 1929 Seelye was the only daughter of Hans and Tuekla Hersch. The family left Nazi-occupied Austria, coming to New Zealand via Dubrovnik. Her father was a doctor, who retrained in medicine at the Otago Medical School and set up in general practice in Auckland. Seelye attended school in Dunedin, did correspondence schooling and gained her matriculation at age 15. She completed a BA in 1948 in Auckland and her medical degree at the Otago Medical School in 1953. In 1954 she married chemistry lecturer Ralph Seelye.

After trying general practice Seelye took up a position as an anaesthetic registrar at Auckland Hospital. In 1960-1961 she was awarded a Fellowship in Science at the University of Oxford; there she gained her FFARCS. She returned to New Zealand in 1962 where she and Dr Marie Simpson were appointed as full-time anaesthetist specialists at Green Lane Hospital. From 1978 to 1985 when she retired she was head of the anaesthesia department; she was succeeded by Simpson. She became an FFARACS in 1968 and FANZCA in 1992.

Seelye and Simpson were part of the cardiothoracic surgical unit and contributed to developments in cardiac perfusion, catheterisation and the care of patients in intensive care. She researched and published on anaesthesia, cardiopulmonary by-pass and other topics.

Seelye died in Auckland City Hospital on 12 November 2010.

== Ralph and Eve Seelye Charitable Trust ==
The Seelyes had no children and set up a charitable trust for educational purposes which funds scholarships for undergraduate and postgraduate students and fellowships at the University of Auckland and University of Otago.

== Selected publications ==
- Seelye, E. R.; Harris, E. A.; Squire, A. W.; Barratt-Boyes, B. G. (1971). "Metabolic effects of deep hypothermia and circulatory arrest in infants during cardiac surgery". British Journal of Anaesthesia. 43 (5): 449–459. doi:10.1093/bja/43.5.449. ISSN 0007-0912. PMID 5556859.
- Barratt-Boyes, B. G.; Neutze, J. M.; Seelye, E. R.; Simpson, M. (1972). "Complete correction of cardiovascular malformations in the first year of life". Progress in Cardiovascular Diseases. 15 (3): 229–253. doi:10.1016/0033-0620(72)90027-8. ISSN 0033-0620. PMID 5086815.
- Seelye, E. R. (1973). "Anaesthesia for children with congenital heart disease". Anaesthesia and Intensive Care. 1 (6): 512–516. doi:10.1177/0310057X7300100609. ISSN 0310-057X. PMID 4585774.
- Gavin, J. B.; Seelye, E. R. (1976). "Heart valve allografts and bacteraemias of dental origin". The New Zealand Dental Journal. 72 (327): 25–27. ISSN 0028-8047. PMID 1062707.
- Barratt-Boyes, B. G.; Harris, E. A.; Kenyon, A. M.; Lindop, C. A.; Seelye, E. R. (1976). "Coronary perfusion and myocardial metabolism during open-heart surgery in man". The Journal of Thoracic and Cardiovascular Surgery. 72 (1): 133–141. doi:10.1016/S0022-5223(19)40107-4. ISSN 0022-5223. PMID 132576.
- Rea, H. H.; Harris, E. A.; Seelye, E. R.; Whitlock, R. M.; Withy, S. J. (1978). "The effects of cardiopulmonary bypass upon pulmonary gas exchange". The Journal of Thoracic and Cardiovascular Surgery. 75 (1): 104–120. doi:10.1016/S0022-5223(19)41169-0. ISSN 0022-5223. PMID 339001.
