= Takaka Tramway =

Light railway in Golden Bay, New Zealand

Coordinates: 40.826795°S 172.803927°E

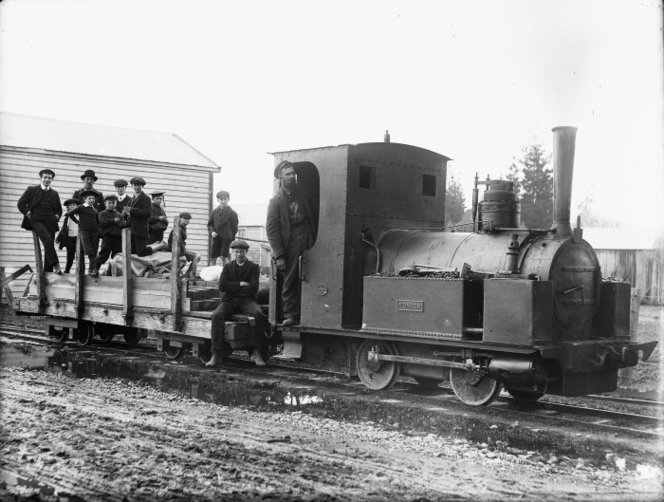
Private locomotive Pioneer on the Takaka Tramway, built at Anchor Foundry, Nelson, ca 1900

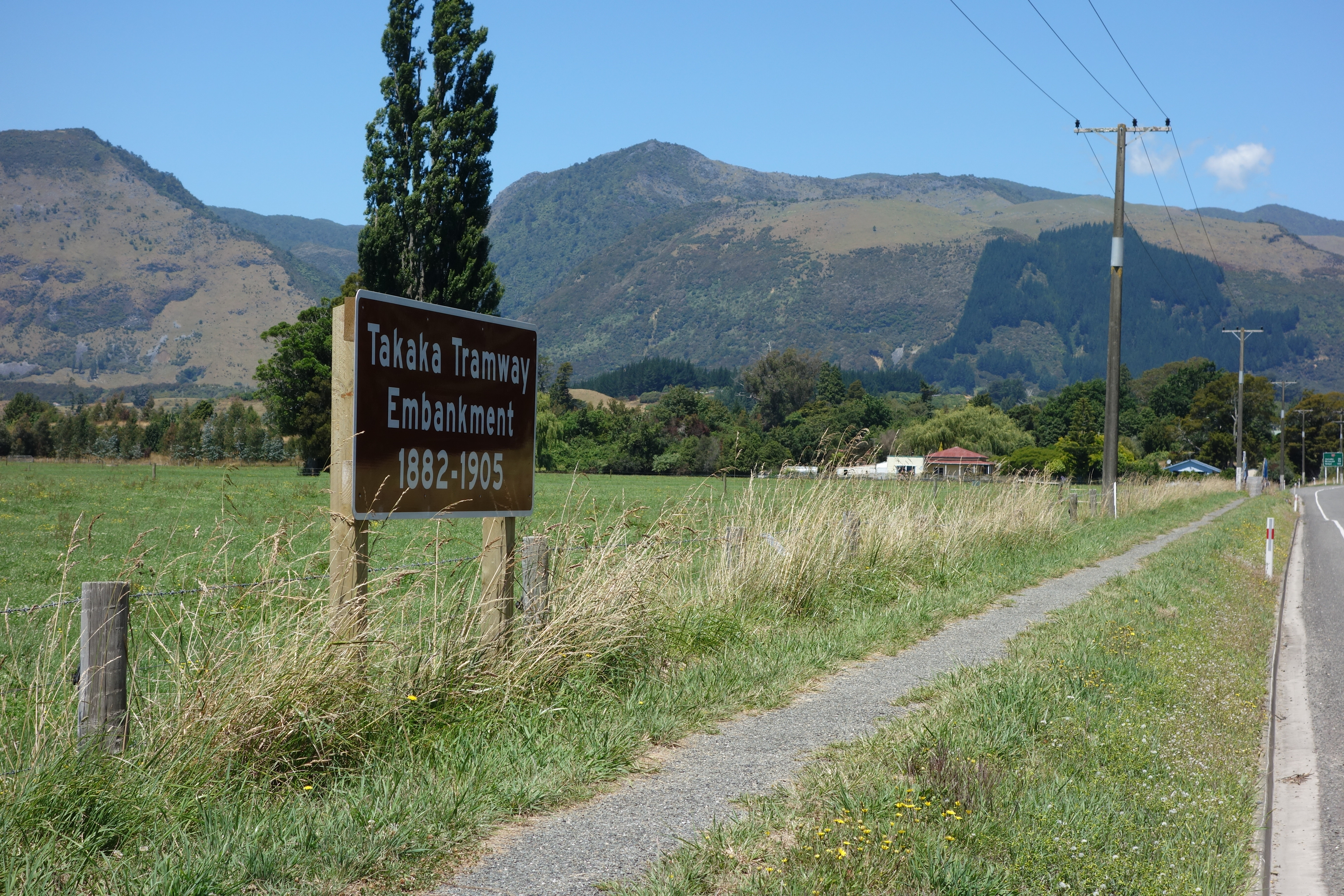
Former tramway embankment south of Tākaka

The Takaka Tramway was a narrow gauge light railway that operated in the Tākaka Valley, Golden Bay, New Zealand, from 1882 to 1905, linking farms and sawmills of the Takaka Valley with the tidal port of Waitapu at the mouth of the Tākaka River.

== Location and history ==
In 1880 John Rochfort surveyed the route of the line. The cost was £1350 per mile. The public endorsed the proposal of the millers and the Takaka Road Board to lay a tramline. The government contributed rails and £2000 towards the project. Another £4000 had to be borrowed. Construction began in February 1881, with the track being of 2 ft 6 in (0.76 m) gauge with light 22 lb/yard (11 kg/m) rails. The line ran from Waitapu Wharf on the coast, south to Tākaka township via Commercial Street. From there, alongside the Tākaka River at Paynes Ford (on a raised embankment between the Tākaka River and high limestone bluffs) through private land on the plains to join East Takaka Road, then met Loop Road and ended at East Tākaka, for a total distance of 13.4 kilometres (8.3 mi).

After the inauguration of the tramway in 1882, the steam locomotive Pioneer ran twice daily with a passenger carriage and two to three truckloads of timber between East Tākaka and the port. The tramway was mainly used for transporting goods and timber to Waitapu for export. By 1905 this traffic had mostly disappeared and the tramway was put up for sale and removed in 1906.

Only one locomotive was used on the line, an 0-4-0T named "Pioneer", built at Anchor Foundry in Nelson. It arrived at Waitapu Wharf on 3 June 1882, had cylinders 5 in (130 mm) by 10 in (250 mm) with 1 ft 9 in (0.53 m) diameter wheels.

In the mid-1890s, the Takaka Tramway Company came into financial problems due to the decline of the timber industry. The ownership changed hands several times. Serious flooding in 1904 virtually destroyed the track of the tramway. In 1905 the locomotive, rolling stock and rails were sold to a Wellington-based company. After the tramway closed, "Pioneer" was last noted as being in an Auckland scrap yard.

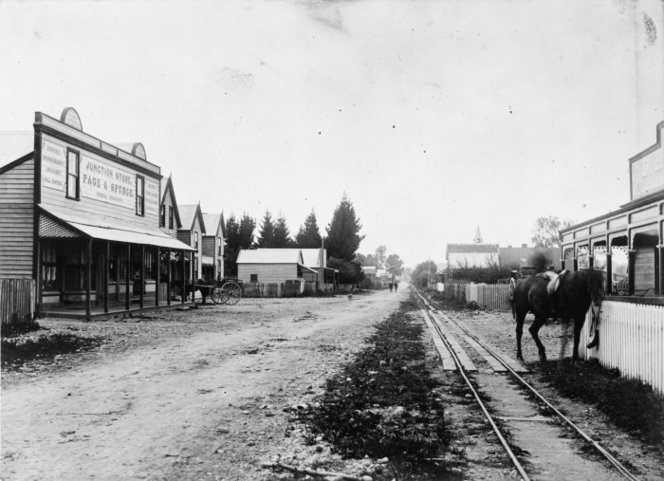
Page & Spurge's Junction Store in Main Street, Tākaka

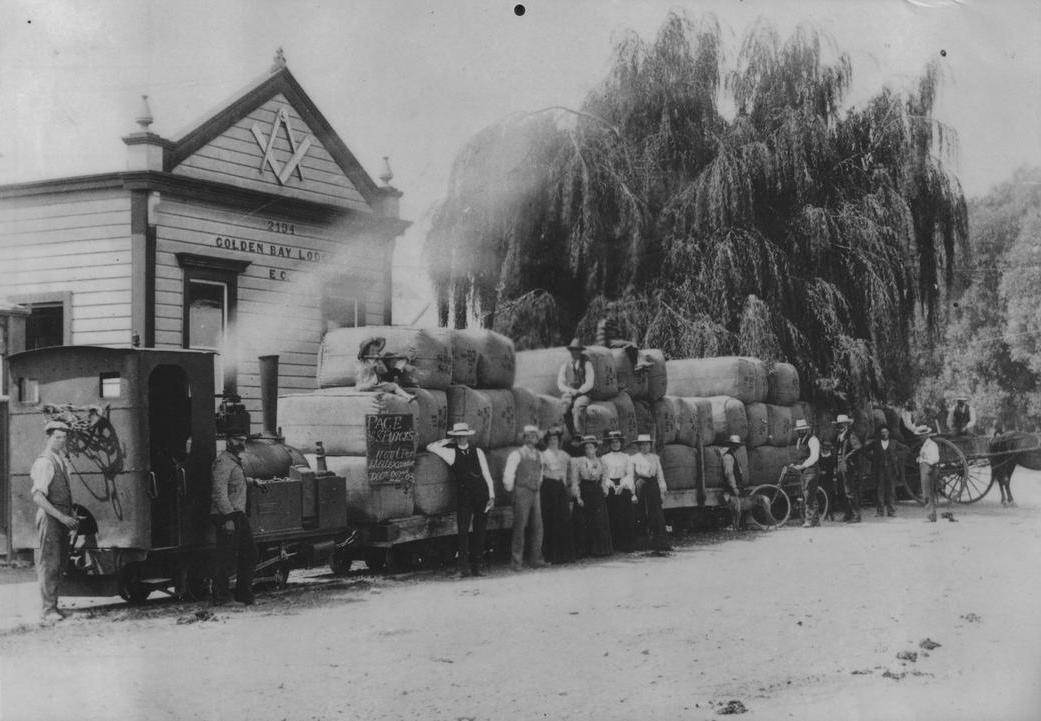
Page & Spurge's wool for SS Alexander, 22 December 1903

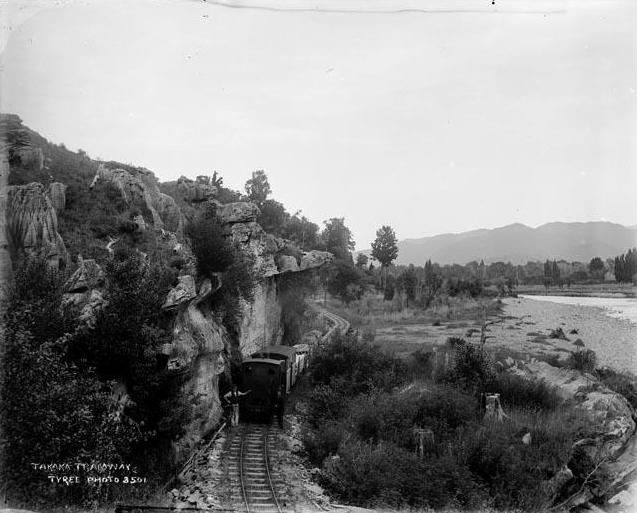
Passenger and goods train under rock ledge beside Tākaka River
