= Sir Douglas Robb Lectures =

Lecture series at the University of Auckland

The Sir Douglas Robb Lectures are a lecture series that have existed at the University of Auckland in New Zealand since 1968. The series is named in honor of Sir Douglas Robb, and is noted for producing physicist Richard Feynman's QED lectures.

A partial list of lectures is as follows:

Lecturer	Year	Topic
John Kenneth Galbraith	1968	-
Steven Runciman	1970	The eastern churches and the secular state
Wilfred David Borrie	1972	Population, environment and society
Macfarlane Burnet	1973	The biology of aging
William Henry Pickering	1974	Exploring our solar system
W. J. M. Mackenzie	1975	Political adaptivity
John Russell Brown	1976	Theatre for today
Ivan Illich	1978	The art of suffering
Richard Feynman	1979	The behaviour of light and electrons
Harry Hinsley	1980	The rise and fall of the modern international system
Richard Leakey	1981	Human Origins
Bernard Lewis	1982	Historical roots of the Islamic revolution
Carleton Gajdusek	1983	Man in isolation
Ngugi Wa Thiong’o	1984	The politics of language in African literature
Hermann Bondi	1985	The world of physics
Stephen Jay Gould	1986	Charles Darwin and the science of history
Laura Nader	1987	Controlling processes
E. P. Thompson	1988	Customs in common
William John Francis Jenner	1989	The power of China's pasts
Ian Brownlie	1990	Treaties and indigenous peoples
Colin Blakemore	1991	Images in the brain
Marshall Sahlins	1992	The anthropology of history in Polynesia
Carole Pateman	1993	Women and democracy
Lewis Wolpert	1994	The unnatural nature of science
Bernice Johnson Reagon	1996	The place of song in African American history
Immanuel Wallerstein	1997	Utopistics, or historical choices of the 21st century
Paul Krugman	1998	What happened to Asia?
Judy Chicago	1999	Women and art
Steven Weinberg	2000	[cancelled for illness]
Steven Pinker	2001	Language, mind, and evolution
David_Barker	2002	Mothers, babies and health in later life
Bryan Sykes	2003	The interpretation of genes
Marina Warner	2004	Magic and transformation in contemporary literature and culture
Carl Wieman	2005	Two breakthroughs in physics research
Jared Diamond	2006	Science, history and human societies
Yash Ghai	2007	Organisation of the state in multi-ethnic societies
Sheldon Rothblatt	2008	"The uses of the university" revisited
Frans de Waal	2009	Our inner ape
Nicholas Stern	2010	The challenges for global collaboration and rationality
Tariq Ali	2011	Empire and its futures
Alison Gopnik	2012	The philosophical baby: What children’s minds can teach us about the big questions
Kwame Anthony Appiah	2013	Identity, Honour, Politics
Kate Pickett and Richard Wilkinson	2014	The Human Cost of Inequality
Stuart Firestein	2016	Science and uncertainty
