= Brian Barratt-Boyes =

New Zealand heart surgeon (1924–2006)

Sir Brian Barratt-Boyes KBE
- Born: Brian Gerald Boyes; 13 January 1924; Wellington, New Zealand
- Died: 8 March 2006 (aged 82); Cleveland, Ohio, US
- Education: University of Otago
- Occupation: Physician
- Known for: early development cardiopulmonary bypass surgery, introduction of human cadaveric artic homografts for aortic valve replacement
- Spouses: Norma Margaret Thomson (m. 1949; div. 1986) Sara Rose Monester (m. 1986)
- Medical career
- Field: Cardiothoracic surgeon
- Institutions: Green Lane Hospital in Auckland, New Zealand

Sir Brian Gerald Barratt-Boyes KBE (born Brian Gerald Boyes, 13 January 1924 – 8 March 2006) was a pioneering New Zealand cardiothoracic surgeon. He was known for early development of cardiopulmonary bypass surgery, early implantation of a cardiac pacemaker before these devices became commercially available in 1961, early use of human cadaveric aortic homografts for aortic valve replacement, and introduced the use of hypothermia and cardiac arrest for surgery in neonates and infants.

== Early life and education ==
Barratt-Boyes was born on 13 January 1924 in Wellington, New Zealand. He was educated at Wellington College. After a year at Victoria University College, he studied medicine at Otago's Medical School in Dunedin, New Zealand, graduating in 1946. He continued his training as a surgeon, initially in New Zealand, and later at the Mayo Clinic (1953–55) and as a Nuffield Fellow in Bristol (1955–56). At Mayo he worked under John W. Kirklin, the two developing a high mutual regard that endured and grew over the years.

== Career ==
In 1956 he was recruited to Green Lane Hospital in Auckland by Sir Douglas Robb, and pioneered the development of cardiopulmonary bypass in New Zealand, the first patient being operated on in 1958. While this task must have been made more difficult by New Zealand's relative remoteness and small population, the hospital's surgical team quickly achieved an international reputation for innovative excellence. Indeed, he suggested that Auckland's isolation conferred an advantage comparable to that enjoyed by the Mayo Clinic in small-town Rochester, Minnesota, making it less likely that day-to-day interruptions would interfere with the real purpose of their work. Much of the original equipment had to be fashioned or modified locally. Sid Yarrow, an engineer on the team, built an early external pacemaker for intra-operative use. The first permanent unit, from Medtronic, was implanted in 1961.

In 1962 he introduced, independently but simultaneously with Donald Ross in London, the human cadaveric aortic homograft for aortic valve replacement and for many years he worked to perfect valve preparation, emphasizing its inherent physiologic advantages and simplifying its surgical implant technique. He and his team's results became the standard for others to match.

Barratt-Boyes headed a new cardio-thoracic unit at the Mater Misericordiae Hospital from 1969. Initially there was not whole-hearted support at the Mater for the unit because it required substantial investment in facilities, nursing and support staff. However it enabled co-operation between the Mater and Green Lane with Mater staff obtaining training at Green Lane, and Yarrow supporting the technical requirements of the surgery. It also enabled Barratt-Boyes to expand his practice to domestic and international patients, and establish the Mater's reputation as a surgical hospital.

In 1969 he brought the technique of profound hypothermia and circulatory arrest into the limelight as a practical method for dealing with major corrective surgery in neonates with congenital heart disease, in so doing further establishing Green Lane Hospital on the international stage. In recognition of these and other achievements he was appointed a Commander of the Order of the British Empire in the 1966 New Year Honours, and promoted to Knight Commander of the same order in the 1971 New Year Honours, further confirming a national prominence comparable to that achieved by René Favaloro in Argentina and Christiaan Barnard in South Africa. Barratt-Boyes showcased the Green Lane experience at many international meetings as well as in workshops he hosted in Auckland. The 1987 Asian Pacific Congress was a particular success for him for the size of the international contingent it drew and the bright spotlight it shone on Green Lane's history of achievement. In 1985 he and John Kirklin published their authoritative text Cardiac Surgery, a colossal achievement of more than 1,500 pages that quickly became the standard reference for the sub-speciality.

== Personal life and death ==
Barratt-Boyes married physiotherapist Norma Margaret Thomson in Dunedin on 9 November 1949. The couple went on to have five sons. In 1986, Barratt-Boyes and his first wife were divorced, and he married Australian lawyer Sara Rose Monester. His first wife, Norma, died on 10 November 2016.

Barratt-Boyes suffered from angina beginning at age 39 and underwent coronary artery bypass surgery at age 50. He was a long time smoker and struggled with quitting. Barratt-Boyes died on 8 March 2006 in Cleveland, Ohio, USA, from complications following valve replacement surgery by Dr. Toby Cosgrove at Cleveland Clinic.

== Sources ==
- Donna Chisholm, From the Heart: A Biography of Sir Brian Barratt-Boyes, Reed Methuen, 1987, ISBN 9780474002120
- Nicholas T. Kouchoukos; Eugene H. Blackstone; Frank L. Hanley; James K. Kirklin (26 October 2012). Kirklin/Barratt-Boyes Cardiac Surgery, Expert Consult - Online and Print (2-Volume Set),4: Kirklin/Barratt-Boyes Cardiac Surgery. Elsevier Health Sciences. p. 9. ISBN 978-1-4160-6391-9.
