= Green Lane Hospital, Auckland =

Public hospital in Auckland, New Zealand

Green Lane Hospital
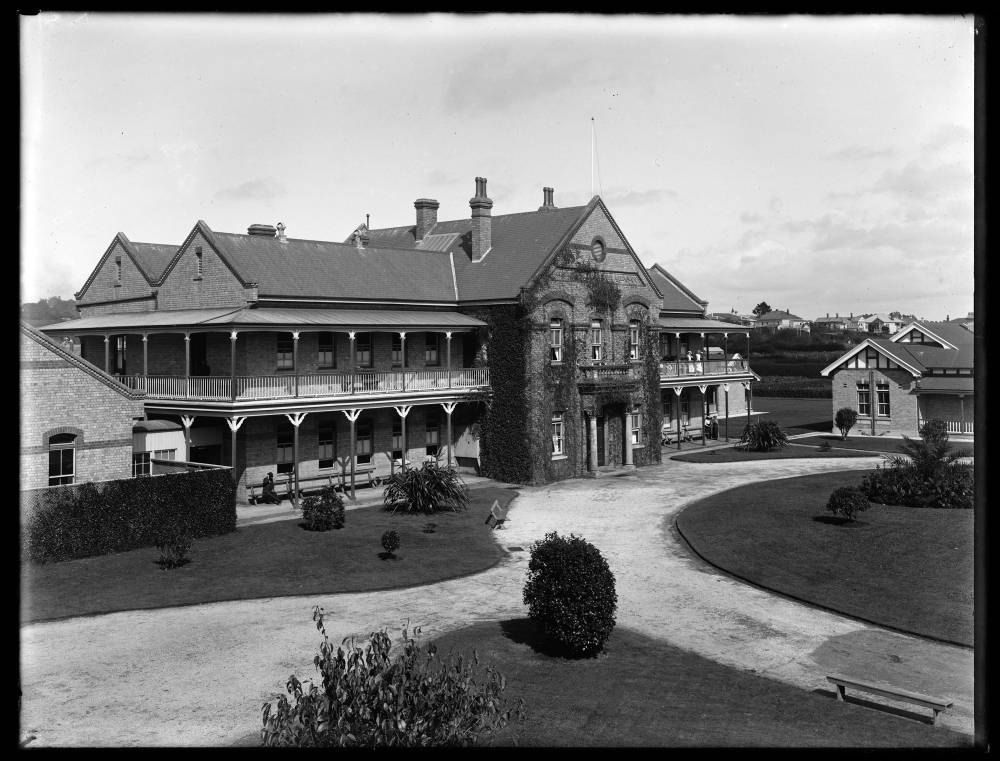
- Costley Home, 1918

Geography
- Location: Greenlane, Auckland, New Zealand
- Coordinates: 36°53′36″S 174°46′49″E

Organisation
- Type: General

History
- Former names: Costley Home for the Aged Poor, Auckland Infirmary
- Opened: 1890

Links
- Lists: Hospitals in New Zealand

Green Lane Hospital in Auckland, New Zealand (now known as the Greenlane Clinical Centre) was a hospital with a national and international reputation for cardiology and cardiothoracic surgery, led by Douglas Robb and Brian Barratt-Boyes. The original hospital, the Costley Home for the Aged Poor, opened in 1890. It was renamed the Auckland Infirmary in 1924 and then Green Lane Hospital in 1942 when it became a general hospital. The hospital's name was sometimes misspelt as Greenlane Hospital. In 2003 it became the Greenlane Clinical Centre when many of the services were moved to Auckland City Hospital.

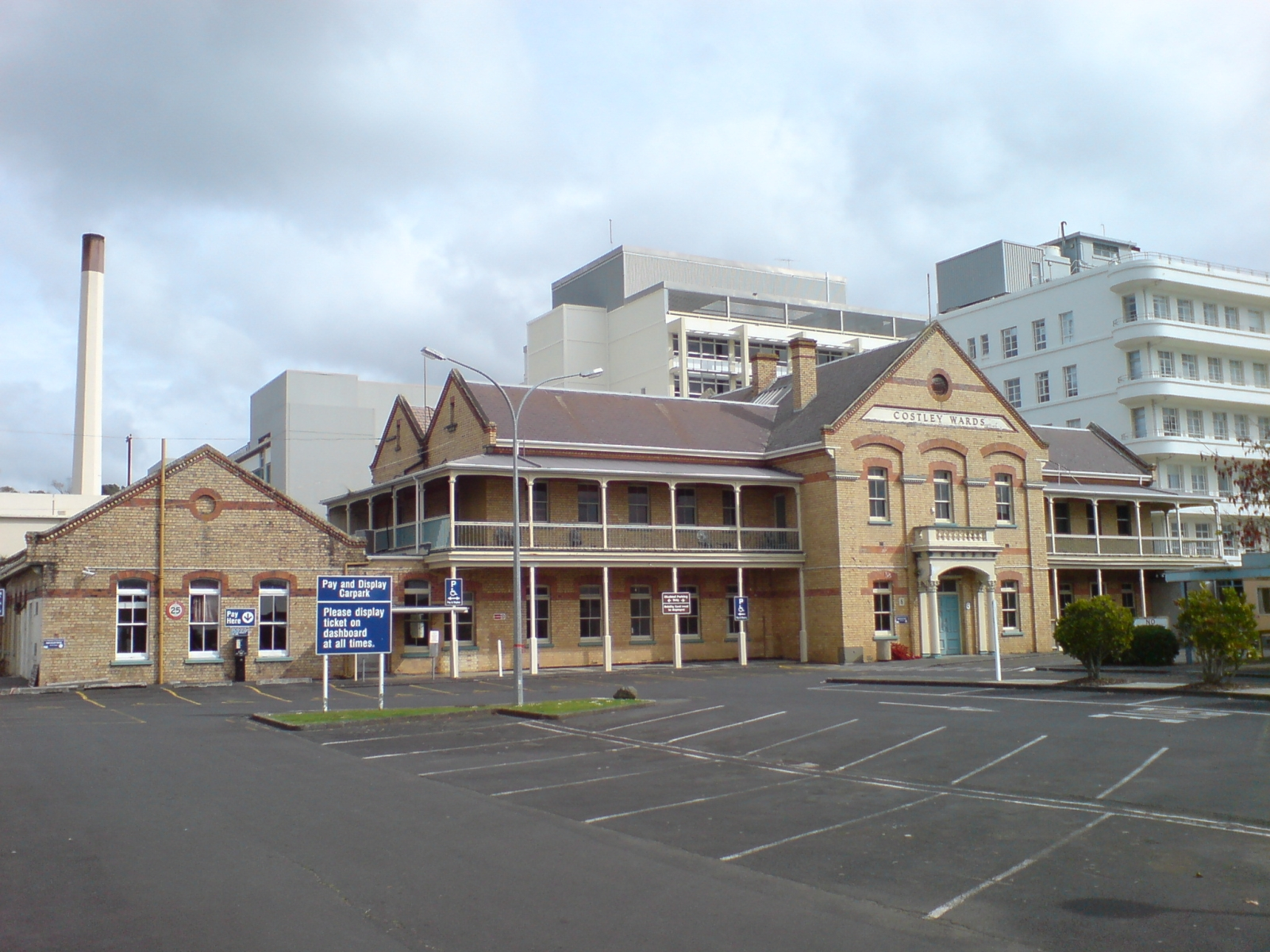
Costley Building in 2008

== Costley Home for the Aged Poor ==
The site for a future hospital was selected by Governor Sir George Grey. In 1886 the land was handed by the Crown to the Auckland Hospital Board and further land was purchased using a bequest from the philanthropist Edward Costley.

Costley's bequest also funded the first hospital building, the Costley Home for the Aged Poor, which was opened in April 1890 by the Governor, the Earl of Onslow. The Costley Home was a two story brick building with ornamental balustrades and a grand staircase. Three brick buildings behind the main building contained dormitories; these buildings were demolished in 1970 to make way for a new building. One hundred and forty eight people were admitted when the Home opened with the number of patients increasing to 248 by 1918.

The hospital cared for chronically ill patients including those with tuberculosis, as well as paupers and the homeless.

In 1906 a new infirmary block was built to care for older male patients who needed more medical and nursing care. The single storey block had an upper storey added to it in 1915. This block was built to the east of the Costley building and a women's infirmary was built to the west in 1923–24.

The standard of care in the Home was inadequate and after some mismanagement by the resident Master and Matron Dr Alexander McKelvey was appointed as the first Medical Superintendent in 1910.

The Costley building was designated a Heritage New Zealand Category 1 historic place in 2010.

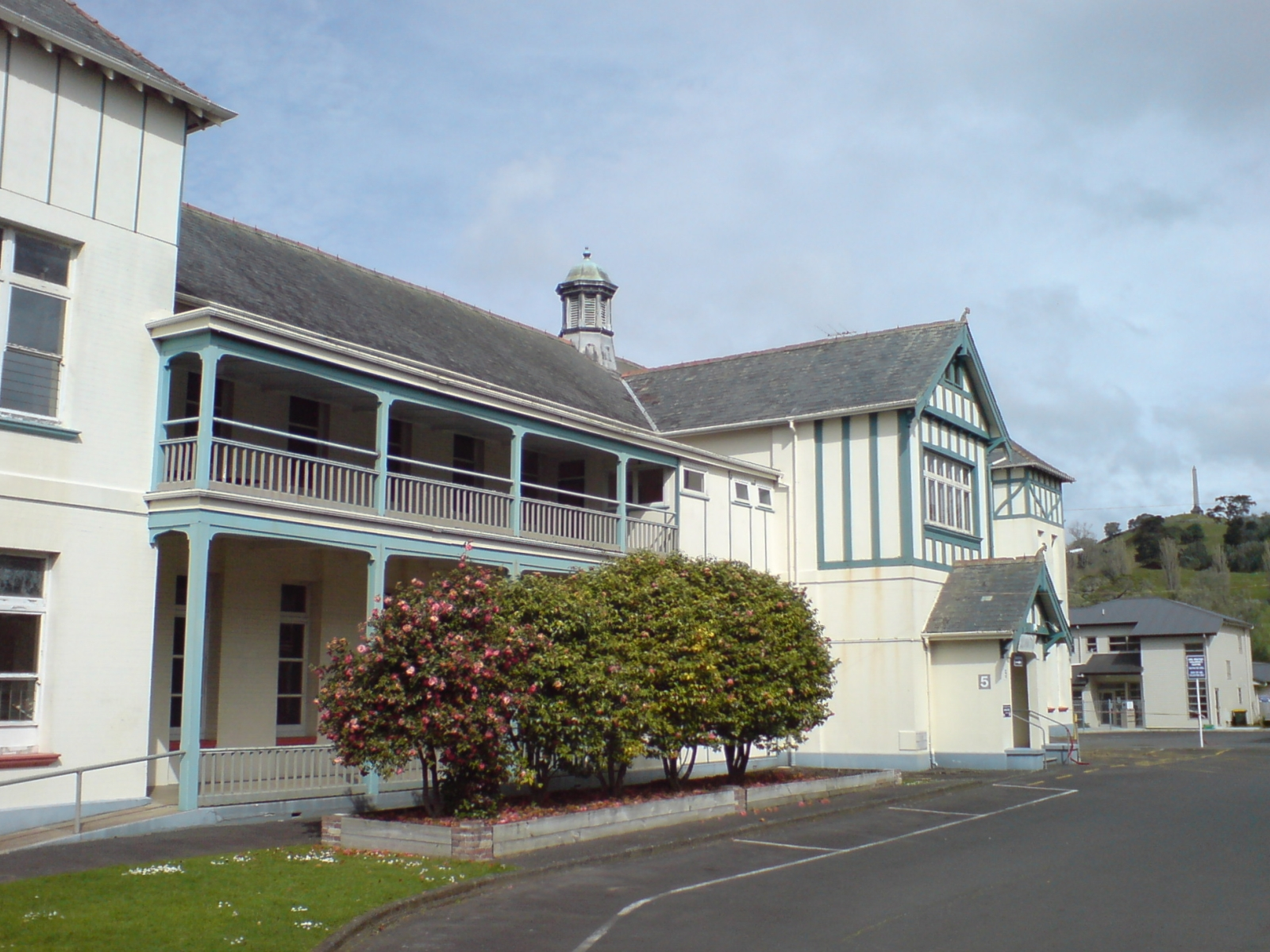
Infirmary building in 2008

== Auckland Infirmary ==
In 1924 the Costley Home was renamed the Auckland Infirmary as the hospital was now funded by the Hospital Board and the number of patients was increasing. The inscription on the building 'Costley Home for the Aged Poor' was replaced with 'Costley Wards'. By 1934 the number of patients had increased to 420.

Patients with tuberculosis had been cared for in the Costley Home in tuberculosis shelters, well-ventilated wooden huts. In 1933 Dr Chisholm McDowell became the hospital's medical tuberculosis officer and care of tuberculosis patients improved with pneumothorax treatment and later BCG vaccine. Facilities at the Infirmary included a bowling green and recreation room.

In 1925 the first wing of the nurses' home was built.

== Green Lane Hospital ==
The Infirmary became a general hospital in 1942 and was named Green Lane Hospital. Roche & Roche note that the name was "sometimes misspelt Greenlane" and "the new name signified the new status of the hospital as well as its locality".

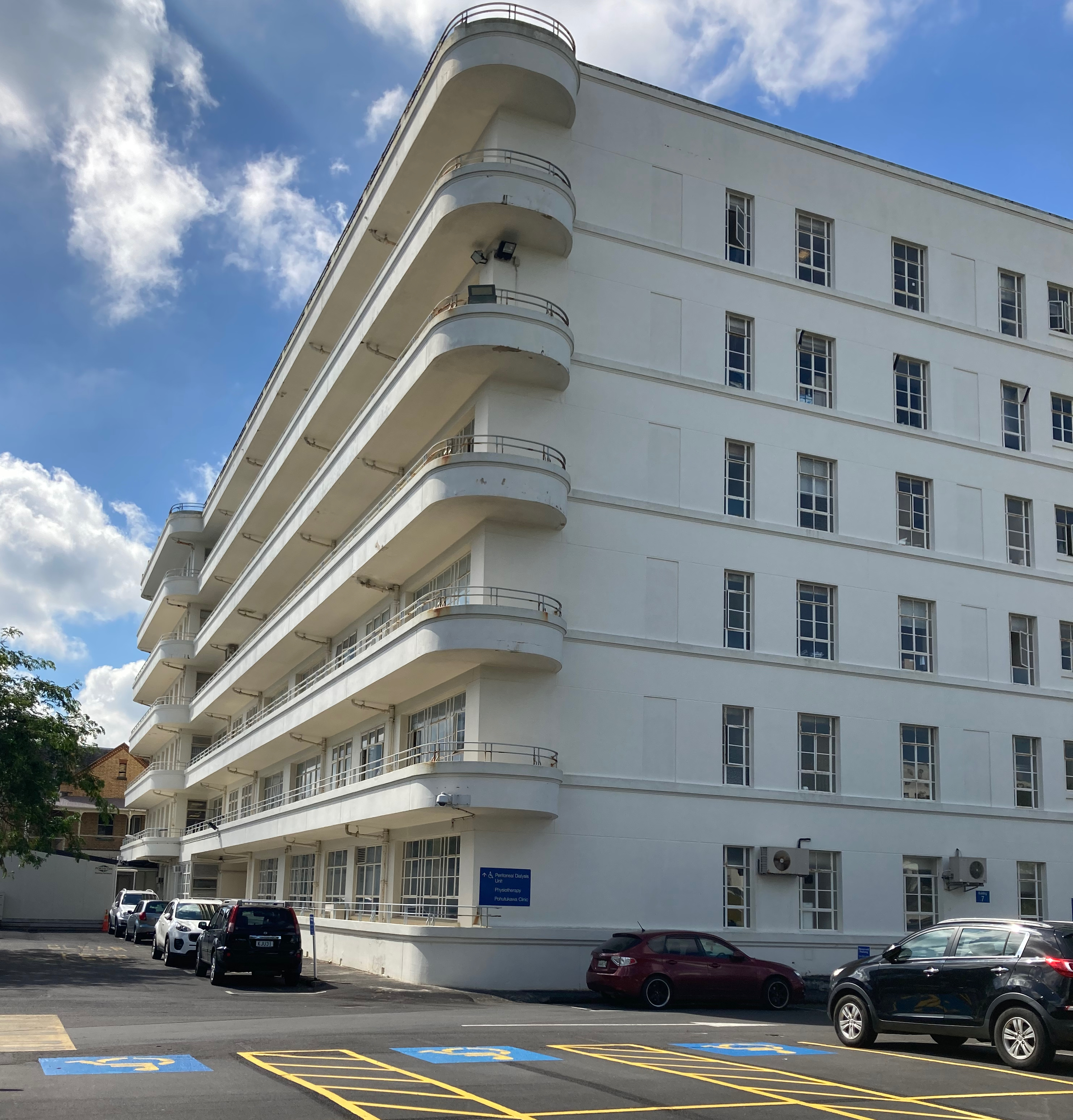
Main building opened 1943 in 2023

In 1943 a six-storey building was opened to accommodate a children's ward, thoracic surgery, a medical ward, cardiology and general surgery. Construction of this building began in 1938 with the intention of housing geriatric and chronically ill patients but during the war the Board decided to use the new building for general medical and surgical cases. By late 1943 the hospital had 730 beds, a number similar to Auckland Hospital. The Costley building was used for operating theatres and the casualty (emergency) department and housing geriatric patients on the upper floor.

During the 1960s and 1970s several new buildings were opened: a new nurses' home, an administration block in 1965, a swimming pool and hall. A new clinical building, sited to the south of the 1943 main building, was opened in 1970 by Governor General Sir Arthur Porritt. It housed adult and paediatric cardiac wards, cardiothoracic surgical wards and operating theatres.

The nurses' home was enlarged in 1946. In 1958 the Green Lane School of Nursing was established, though general nursing training had begun in the early 1940s.

=== Cardiology and cardiothoracic surgery ===
The development of cardiology and cardiothoracic surgery began at Green Lane with the appointment of surgeon Douglas Robb in 1942, cardiologist Edward Roche in 1944 and other medical specialists. A multi-disciplinary Cardio-Surgical Unit was approved by the Hospital Board in 1948. During the early years of pioneering surgery the surgeons collaborated with the Department of Scientific and Industrial Research (DSIR) to develop surgical instruments and the Ruakura Animal Research Centre to develop and refine surgical procedures. In 1954 the hospital established its own surgical development laboratory to develop equipment and techniques for more complex surgery. Much of the pioneering work of modifying and making instruments from the by-pass machine, cardiac catherterisation instrumentation and a pacemaker was undertaken by technician Sidney Yarrow.

The first successful surgery in New Zealand to correct a congenital heart condition patent ductus arteriosis, was performed in Wellington in 1944. In the same year Robb unsuccessfully performed the procedure followed by a successful case in 1946. The first Blalock–Thomas–Taussig surgical procedure to treat 'blue baby' syndrome caused by Tetralogy of Fallot took place in 1948, though this procedure was later replaced by by-pass surgery.

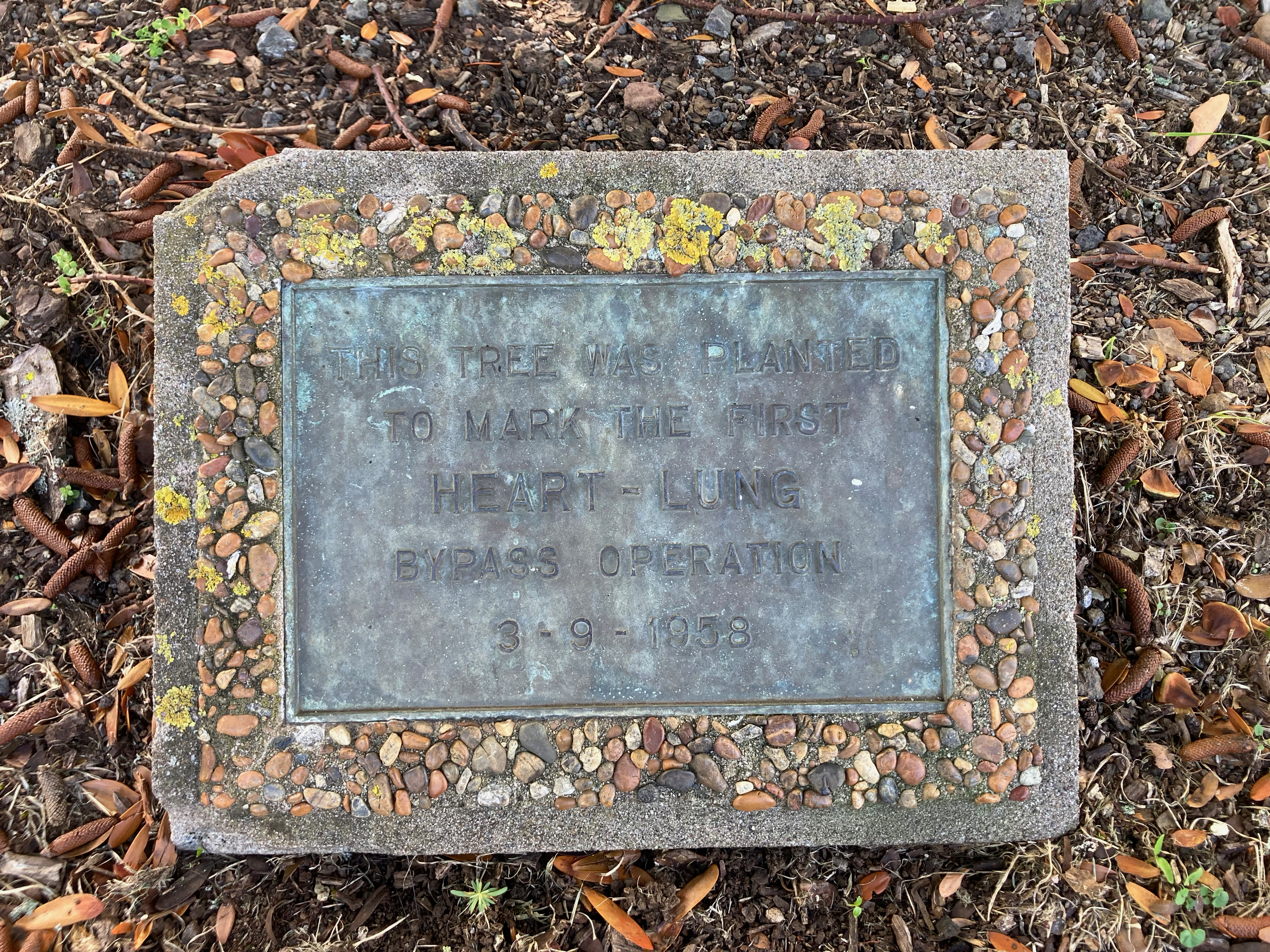
Memorial for first heart-lung bypass, 1958

In 1957 surgeon Brian Barratt-Boyes was recruited by Douglas Robb to join the team at Green Lane. He obtained a heart-lung bypass machine but it required some modifications before it was used in the first open heart surgery on a child with a congenital 'hole in the heart' (Ventricular septal defect) in 1958.

To commemorate this milestone a kauri tree was planted in the hospital grounds and a plaque placed at its base. One hundred and ten by-pass operations had been performed by the end of 1960 and it was used for Tetralogy of Fallot, pulmonary stenosis, aortic and mitral valvotomies. In the 1960s and 1970s, in addition to heart-lung by-pass surgery, other procedures were performed and perfected: mitral valvotomy, arterial surgery, repair of aneurysms and artery grafts as well as performing surgery under hypothermia. Mitral valve replacement surgery commenced in 1962 using the Starr-Edwards prosthesis.

Barratt-Boyes undertook New Zealand's first homograft aortic valve replacement in 1962. This was pioneering surgery and had not been reported in the medical literature. It was subsequently discovered that a few weeks before Barratt-Boyes's surgery the same procedure had been performed by Donald Ross at Guy's Hospital in London.

Surgery to insert pacemakers began in 1961 using a small American pacemaker; although the laboratory at Green Lane had developed a pacemaker three years earlier it could only be used in cardiac emergencies rather than implanted.

A transplantation service was established when the Minister of Health requested that the Auckland Hospital Board create the service at Green Lane. Funds were spent to modify the intensive care facilities and to provide accommodation for patients who were required to stay for rehabilitation at the hospital after the surgery. The accommodation was known as "Hearty Towers". The first heart transplant took place on 2 December 1987. Ten transplants were performed in the following 18 months and eight patients survived. Between 1987 and 2001 136 heart transplants were performed and 52 lung transplants between 1994 and 2001. The entertainer Billy T. James was one of the recipients of a donor heart.

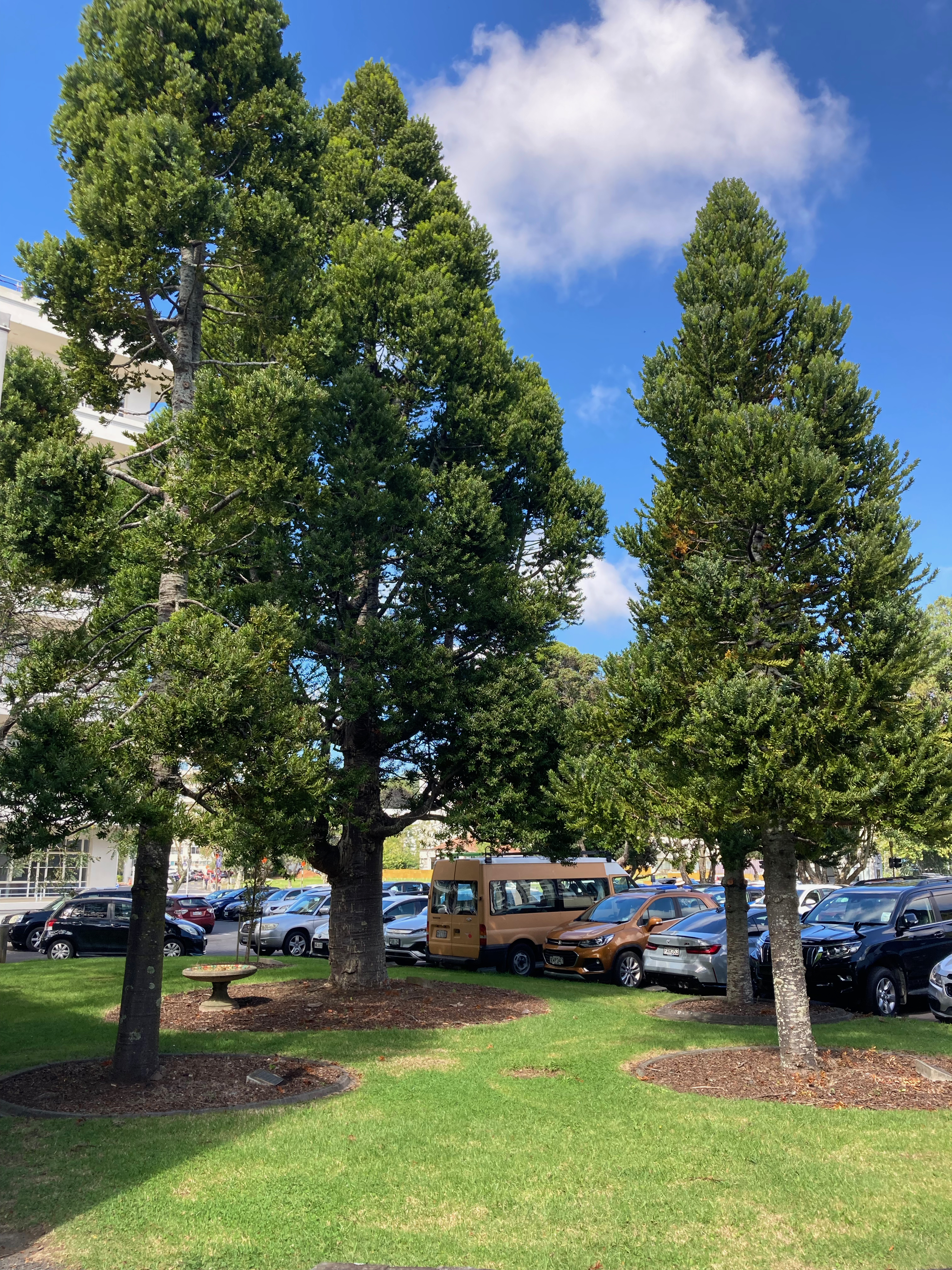
Kauri grove where memorial plaques have been placed

Over 1500 congenital heart patients were operated on between 1958 and 1988 amounting to nearly 2000 surgical by-pass and non-by-pass surgeries. Survival rates have been good; of the patients operated on in 1958 80% were still alive at the end of 2020.

Over the years there were many occasions when Green Lane staff made visits overseas to conferences and to work in hospitals. Green Lane also hosted overseas visitors for cardiology or cardiovascular training and international symposia all of which built a national and international reputation for cardiac care.

== Greenlane Clinical Centre ==
When all inpatient services were moved to the Auckland City Hospital in 2003 Green Lane Hospital became the Greenlane Clinical Centre treating outpatients and day surgery cases. The Greenlane Clinical Centre is part of Te Whatu Ora Northern Region (formerly Auckland District Health Board). The Green Lane Paediatric and Congenital Cardiac Service, based at Starship Hospital, continues to provide national treatment for paediatric and adult congenital heart problems.

== Legacy ==
=== Research ===
The Auckland Medical Research Fund was established in 1955 by Douglas Robb and others to promote research in hospitals.

The Green Lane Research & Educational Fund was set up in 1971 to support research and education in adult and paediatric cardiology, cardiothoracic surgery and respiratory medicine. The fund published a book on heart health for New Zealanders.

In 1984 Dr Harvey White established the Green Lane Cardiovascular Research Unit (CVRU) which undertook collaborative trials with New Zealand and overseas researchers. The research organisation the Green Lane Coordinating Centre Limited (GLCC) was formed in 2003. The CVRU, now based at Auckland City Hospital, and the GLCC continue to participate in international trials and publish study results.

In 2001 a special supplement of the New Zealand Medical Journal honoured the work of six cardiology and cardiothoracic consultants: Trevor Agnew, Pat Clarkson, Alan Kerr, John Mercer, John Neutze, and Toby Whitlock.

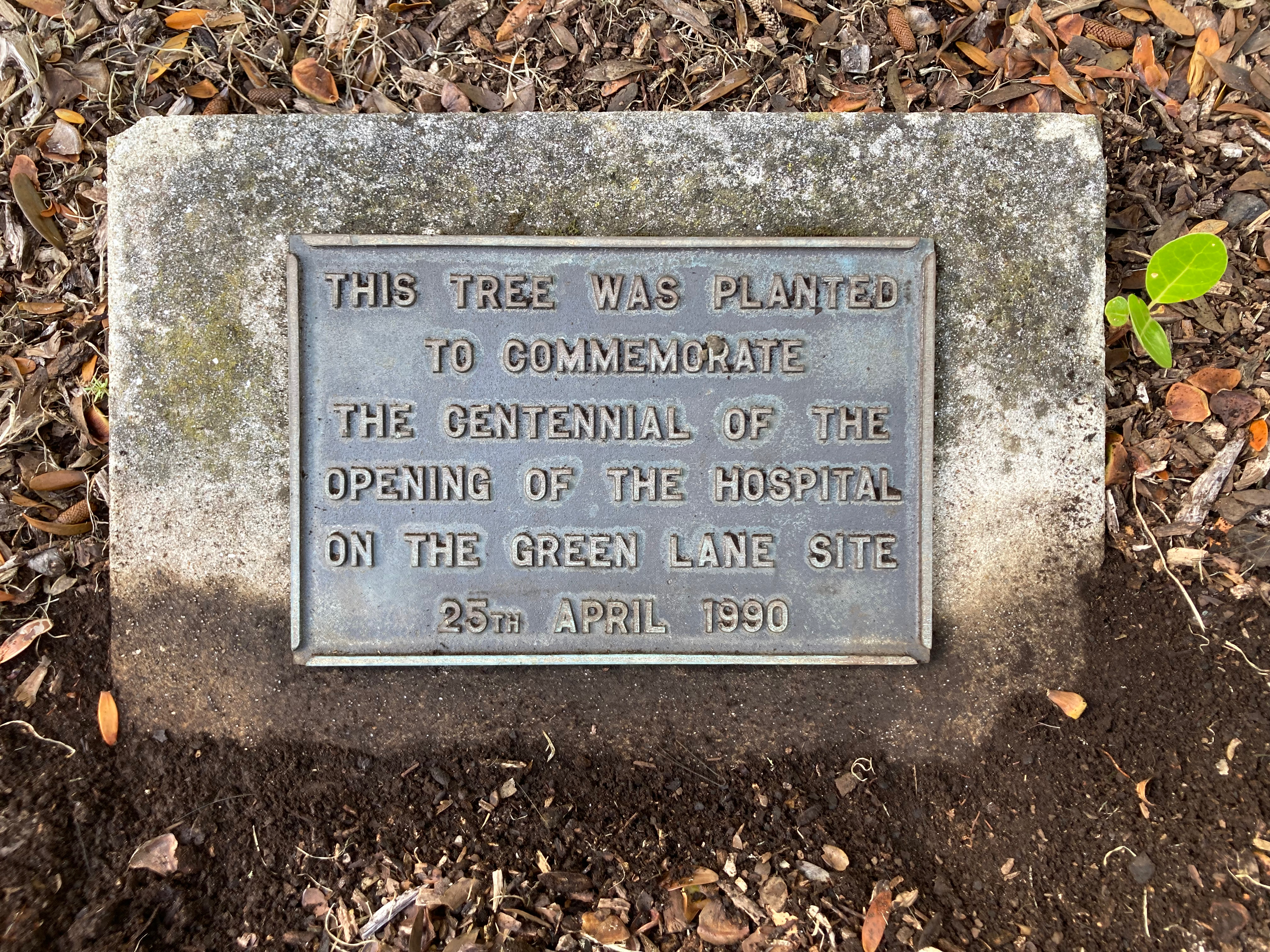
Centennial plaque in the kauri grove, 1990

=== Centenary ===
Centennial celebrations were held in 1990 and a memorial plaque was unveiled by the Minister of Health Helen Clark. A Centennial Fund was set up to offer a scholarship to a staff member for education. The Centennial Fund is administered by the Green Lane Research & Educational Fund.

== Notable staff ==
=== Medical superintendents ===
- Alexander McKelvey (1910–1931)
- Charles Maguire (1932–1938)
- E.L. Fitzgerald (1938–1941), the last superintendent of the Auckland Infirmary.
- Carlyle Gilberd (1941–1959), the first Medical Superintendent of Green Lane Hospital held the position until his death.
- James Newman (1959–1968)
- Henry Stone (1968–1987)
- R.M.L. (Toby) Whitlock (1987–1989), the post of Medical Superintendent was abolished and Whitlock became Chief of Medical Staff.

=== Doctors ===
- Eric Anson, anaesthetist
- Brian Barratt-Boyes (1957–1989), surgeon
- Peter Brandt, MBE (1965–ca. 1991), cardiac radiologist specialising in angiocardiography
- David Cole (1955–1974), surgeon and later Dean of the Auckland Medical School
- Alan Kerr (1961–2000), surgeon
- James Lowe, OBE (1953–1982), cardiologist
- Chisholm McDowell (1933–1966), chest physician
- Pat Eisdell Moore, OBE (1954–?), ENT specialist
- Robin Norris (1965–1992), physician and director of the Coronary Care Unit
- Douglas Robb (1942–1964), surgeon
- Anthony Roche (1971–1993), cardiologist
- Edward Roche (1944–1974), cardiologist
- Eva Seelye (1961–1985), anaesthetist
- Marie Simpson (1960–?), anaesthetist

=== Nursing staff ===
- Annie Blewett (1935–1945), first Lady Superintendent of the Infirmary
- Marini Jackson (1946–1956) second Lady Superintendent
