= East Tākaka =

Locality in Tasman District, New Zealand

- locality
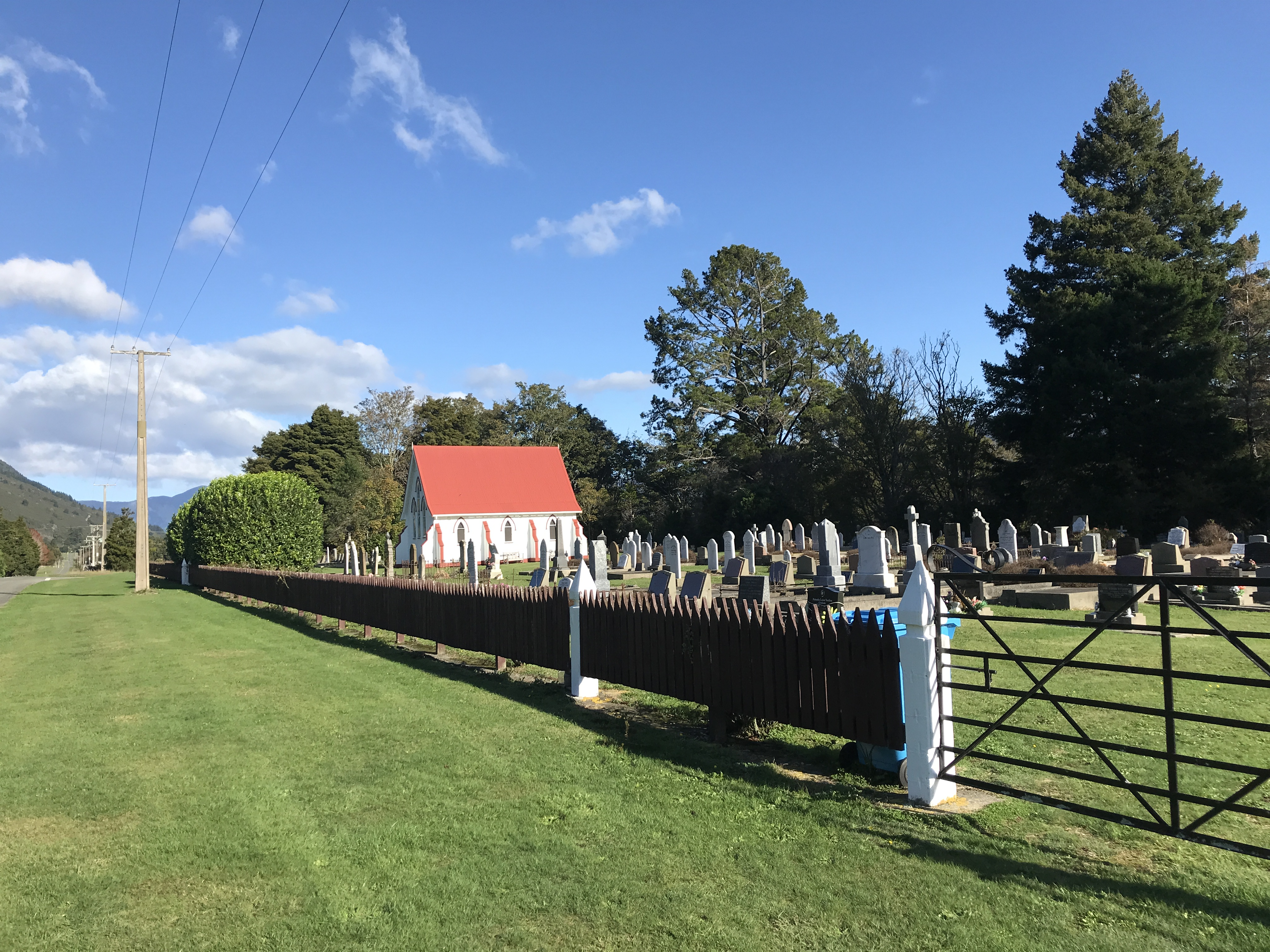
- East Tākaka Cemetery and Church
- Interactive map of East Tākaka
- Coordinates: 40°55′30″S 172°49′41″E
- Country: New Zealand
- Territorial authority: Tasman
- Ward: Golden Bay Ward
- Electorates: West Coast-Tasman; Te Tai Tonga (Māori)

Government
  - Territorial authority: Tasman District Council
  - Mayor of Tasman: Tim King
  - West Coast-Tasman MP: Maureen Pugh
  - Te Tai Tonga MP: Tākuta Ferris

Area
  - Total: 94.01 km^{2} (36.30 sq mi)

Population (2023 census)
  - Total: 216
  - Density: 2.30/km^{2} (5.95/sq mi)
- Time zone: UTC+12 (NZST)
  - Summer (DST): UTC+13 (NZDT)
- Postcode: 7183
- Area code: 03

East Tākaka is a settlement in the Tasman District of New Zealand. It is located in Golden Bay, 8 kilometres (5.0 mi) south of Tākaka.

Located in the Tākaka valley, East Tākaka sits on the eastern side of the Tākaka River. The area developed from the 1860s, with an Anglican church built in 1868, the East Takaka School being established in 1874, and a post office—called Takaka East—opening in 1877. Sawmilling was an important industry in the early days, with large areas of native forest in the Tākaka valley being exploited. The sawn timber was taken to the coast and shipped throughout New Zealand, facilitated between 1882 and 1905 by the steam-powered Takaka Tramway that ran from East Tākaka to the wharf at Waitapu, at the mouth of the Tākaka River. Other activities in the area included sheep farming and hop growing.

East Tākaka School operated between 1874 and 1968. The old building, given historic place category 2 status by Heritage New Zealand in 1990, is now used as the local community hall. East Takaka Church, described as "a fine example of the small Gothic Revival churches built in timber throughout New Zealand in the second half of [the nineteenth] century", was listed as a category 1 historic place by Heritage New Zealand in 1990.

== Demographics ==
East Tākaka locality covers 94.01 km^{2} (36.30 sq mi). It is part of the larger Pōhara-Abel Tasman statistical area.

Historical population
Year	Pop.	±% p.a.
2006	210	—
2013	207	−0.21%
2018	198	−0.89%
2023	216	+1.76%

East Tākaka had a population of 216 in the 2023 New Zealand census, an increase of 18 people (9.1%) since the 2018 census, and an increase of 9 people (4.3%) since the 2013 census. There were 114 males and 102 females in 96 dwellings. 2.8% of people identified as LGBTIQ+. The median age was 46.3 years (compared with 38.1 years nationally). There were 30 people (13.9%) aged under 15 years, 36 (16.7%) aged 15 to 29, 111 (51.4%) aged 30 to 64, and 39 (18.1%) aged 65 or older.

People could identify as more than one ethnicity. The results were 94.4% European (Pākehā); 6.9% Māori; 2.8% Asian; 1.4% Middle Eastern, Latin American and African New Zealanders (MELAA); and 5.6% other, which includes people giving their ethnicity as "New Zealander". English was spoken by 95.8%, Māori by 1.4%, and other languages by 9.7%. No language could be spoken by 2.8% (e.g. too young to talk). The percentage of people born overseas was 20.8, compared with 28.8% nationally.

Religious affiliations were 16.7% Christian, 1.4% Hindu, 4.2% New Age, and 2.8% other religions. People who answered that they had no religion were 68.1%, and 8.3% of people did not answer the census question.

Of those at least 15 years old, 39 (21.0%) people had a bachelor's or higher degree, 105 (56.5%) had a post-high school certificate or diploma, and 48 (25.8%) people exclusively held high school qualifications. The median income was $27,700, compared with $41,500 nationally. 6 people (3.2%) earned over $100,000 compared to 12.1% nationally. The employment status of those at least 15 was 75 (40.3%) full-time, 42 (22.6%) part-time, and 9 (4.8%) unemployed.
