= James Newman (geriatrician) =

New Zealand geriatrician and advocate for the elderly

James Lister Newman QSO (23 April 1903 – 17 October 1983) was a New Zealand geriatrician and advocate for the elderly, a medical superintendent at Cornwall and Green Lane Hospitals in Auckland, and writer of the Family Doctor column in The New Zealand Herald.

== Early life ==
James Newman was born in London in 1903 the son of Charles Arnold and Kate Newman, née Beck. He was one of three sons of whom two, James and Charles, became doctors. He attended Shrewsbury School followed by Magdalene College at Cambridge University where he gained his Natural Sciences tripos. Newman qualified with an MRCS and LRCP in 1927, having completed his clinical years at Kings College Hospital in London. In 1929 he received his MB BChir medical degree from Cambridge Medical School.

== Career ==
Newman's first positions were in London at the Royal Chest Hospital, Drury Lane Dispensary and the Fountain Hospital. He gained a Diploma in Public Health (DPH) in 1931 and a MD Cantab in 1933; his thesis, later published as an article, was on the thyroid and intellectual disability. He practised in public health, first as assistant medical officer of health in Southampton and from 1933 in the same position to the London County Council with responsibility for the East End. He became deputy medical officer of health in West Sussex in 1936 the same year he gained the MRCP. During World War II he was medical officer in charge of mobile first aid posts in Warwickshire and for ambulance services in Coventry. He wrote on various aspects of his public health work, including a study of the incidence of impetigo in Southampton and an outbreak of infectious hepatitis in the Lavant Valley.

In 1947 he emigrated to New Zealand where he became the medical officer of health for Northland, based in Whangārei. During the 1948 polio epidemic he did not close schools or restrict attendance at public functions in areas where there were no polio cases, an approach which was supported by other doctors. This brought him into conflict with Dr George McCall Smith, the medical superintendent of the Rawene Hospital in the Hokianga, who demanded widespread closure of schools and shops.

Newman resigned as medical officer of health in 1949 citing difficulties with the bureaucracy of government which hampered the work of the district health offices, the Official Secrets Act which prevented relevant information being used for the education of the public, and the lack of recognition in the public service of professional qualifications and experience. He returned to clinical medicine in 1950 as a registrar and then specialist at Green Lane Hospital in Auckland. In 1952 he was appointed medical superintendent of Cornwall Hospital which catered for obstetrics and gynaecology and geriatrics. It was here that he became dedicated to improving standards of care for the elderly, in hospitals, rest homes and in the community. He wrote an unpublished history of the hospital. In 1953 he became MRACP and was elected FRACP in 1959.

In 1959 he became medical superintendent of Green Lane Hospital. Summing up the state of geriatric care in New Zealand he advocated for geriatrics to care for the whole person rather than just treating disease, and for better services and facilities, such as geriatric annexes to general hospitals. He called for better prevention and management of incontinence in patients in hospitals and rest homes by modifying institutional routines to suit the patient.

In 1961 he undertook an overseas tour to look at care of the elderly and to attend an international conference on geriatrics in San Francisco. Calling on the examples he had seen in Britain, Europe and the United States he firmly advocated for better housing and the importance of social contact for the elderly. In Zürich, Oslo, London and San Francisco he visited a number of clubs for older people which reduced social isolation. Newman believed that while New Zealand governments had addressed the needs of families with its state housing programme the needs of the elderly had been ignored by central and local government. He was not a whole-hearted advocate for retirement villages as they risked segregating the elderly. He wrote "It is time for a positive drive at the heart of the problem which is simply to help our older citizens to live where they belong, as sharers of the community they have helped to build." He considered that one housing option for the elderly might be achieved by redeveloping central city areas to provide high-rise buildings of several storeys where older people could live close to ordinary life. He visited Sturminster Newton in England where in the 1960s the local council had provided a high proportion of retirement dwellings in relation to the whole population. Based on what he saw at Sturminster Newton, he concluded that small groups of six to twelve dwellings arranged around three or four sides of a court would be an ideal model for housing; this would enable easy delivery of services or supervision or support, where needed, by a housing manager. He believed that the best care of the elderly could be achieved by their living in the community in suitable housing, which would enable them to care for themselves.

Newman retired in 1968 as required by the Auckland Hospital Board's compulsory retirement rule. He was critical of a compulsory retirement age arguing that older people were still useful and could contribute to the workforce and economy. After his retirement he continued in various roles as medical officer to the Blood Transfusion Service and the Disabled Servicemen's Re-establishment League (known from 1974 as the Rehabilitation League).

As well as writing for medical journals he wrote more broadly for the general public. From 1957 to 1969 he edited and wrote for the New Zealand Family Doctor magazine, published by Wilson and Horton publishers of the New Zealand Herald. He wrote the Family Doctor column in the New Zealand Herald for 25 years. His last column was published on the day of his funeral in 1983. In it he wrote that solving housing problems such as lowering the cost of mortgages, providing low-cost rental housing and promoting inner city areas for residential purposes would contribute more for the health of the community than building hospitals.

Newman had a particular interest in medical history and published on the English physician William Harvey, scientific hoaxes, early medical practice in New Zealand and apothecary jars. His collection of apothecary jars is held by the Ernest and Marion Davis Library in Auckland. He was a founding member of the Auckland Medical Historical Society.

Apart from his contribution to the field of geriatrics he was also known for his qualities of sympathy and compassion for patients and as a clinical teacher.

He died in Auckland on 17 October 1983.

== Personal life ==
He married Margaret Cannon in London in 1932 and they had one son and two daughters.

== Honours and awards ==
In the 1975 Queen's Birthday Honours, Newman was appointed a Companion of the Queen's Service Order for public services, for services to the care of geriatrics.
