= New Zealand Institute (think tank) =

New Zealand privately funded think tank

The New Zealand Institute was a privately funded think tank based in Auckland, New Zealand, which existed from July 2004 until April 2012, when it was merged into the New Zealand Initiative.

The Institute was founded by former New Zealand Treasury researcher Dr David Skilling, with the expressed aim of "generating ideas, solutions and debate that will improve economic prosperity, social well-being, environmental quality and environmental productivity".

In comparison with longer-established think-tanks such as the New Zealand Business Roundtable, it was envisaged as less doctrinaire.

The address of the New Zealand Institute was Auckland 1142, PO Box 90840.

== Background ==
The New Zealand Institute described itself as: "a privately funded think-tank committed to generating ideas, debate and solutions that will improve economic prosperity, social well-being, environmental quality and environmental productivity for New Zealand and New Zealanders."

One media source described the New Zealand Institute as libertarian in outlook. The Institute claimed to be "committed to political neutrality and evidence-based analysis."

== Institute staff ==
The following people were involved with the Institute up to its merger:

- Tony Carter (Chair)
- Dr Rick Boven (Director)
- Catherine Harland (Project Leader)
- Lillian Grace (Research Associate)

== Merger ==
With the departure of founding director David Skilling, the organisation attracted a lower profile, until it was announced in 2011 that it would merge with the New Zealand Business Roundtable. The merger was officially completed in April 2012, with the new merged organisation known as the New Zealand Initiative.

== Publications ==
- NZahead report card update – October 2011, by Rick Boven, Catherine Harland, Lillian Grace
- More ladders, fewer snakes: Two proposals to reduce youth disadvantage – July 2011, by Rick Boven, Catherine Harland, Lillian Grace
- Plugging the gap: An internationalisation strategy – December 2010, by Rick Boven, Catherine Harland, Lillian Grace
- A goal is not a strategy: Focusing efforts to improve New Zealand's prosperity – August 2010, by Rick Boven, Dan Bidois, Catherine Harland
- Standing on the shoulders of science: Getting more value from the innovation ecosystem – December 2009, by Rick Boven

== See also ==
- List of think tanks in New Zealand
