= Brian Easton (economist) =

New Zealand economist

Brian Easton (born 1943) is an economist and historian from New Zealand. He was the economics columnist for the New Zealand Listener magazine for 37 years (1977–2014), giving him a high public profile nationally. He has held a number of university teaching posts and also works as an independent commentator. Easton is known for his criticism of economic orthodoxy.

== Background ==
Easton was born in 1943 and grew up in Christchurch, New Zealand. He holds degrees in mathematics and economics from the University of Canterbury, and in economics from Victoria University of Wellington.

== Career ==
Easton was director of the New Zealand Institute of Economic Research from 1981 to 1986. He is a Fellow of the Royal Statistical Society, a Chartered Statistician, and a Member of the Royal Society of New Zealand.

=== Academia ===
Easton has held a number of scholarships and fellowships including visiting fellowships at the University of Melbourne, as Richard Downing Research Professor, Georgetown and Harvard Universities, as a Fulbright NZ Distinguished Visiting Fellow and a Marsden Fellowship (2003–2006). In 2002 he was appointed to the New Zealand Prime Minister's Growth and Innovation Advisory Board and, in 2005, he was made a Distinguished Fellow of the New Zealand Association of Economists. He has documented his current work activity and interests in his personal web site.

== Selected works ==
- Easton, Brian. In Open Seas: How the New Zealand Labour Government Went Wrong: 2017-2023, Kea Point, 2024, ISBN 9780473725730
- Easton, Brian, Not in Narrow Seas: The Economic History of Aotearoa New Zealand. Victoria University Press, 2020, ISBN 9781776563043
- Easton, Brian, Heke Tangata: Māori in Markets and Cities. Te Whānau o Waipareira Trust, 2018, ISBN 9780947506438
- Easton, Brian, Globalisation and the Wealth of Nations. Auckland University Press, 2007, ISBN 9781869403775
- Easton, Brian, The Nationbuilders Auckland University Press, 2001, ISBN 9781869402600
- Easton, Brian, The Whimpering of the State: Policy after MMP. Auckland University Press, 1999, ISBN 1869402189
- Easton, Brian, The Commercialisation of New Zealand. Auckland University Press, 1997, ISBN 1869401735
- Easton, Brian, In Stormy Seas: The Post-war New Zealand economy. Otago University Press, 1997, ISBN 1877133086
- Easton, Brian, The Making of Rogernomics. Oxford University Press, 1989, ISBN 1869400410
- Easton, Brian, Social Policy and the Welfare State in New Zealand. Allen & Unwin, 1980, ISBN 0868613932
