= New Zealand Institute of Economic Research =

Economic think tank in New Zealand

The New Zealand Institute of Economic Research (NZIER) is the largest independent think tank in New Zealand. It is non-profit incorporated society and was established in 1958. It seeks to take a centrist, politically neutral position.

NZIER specializes in applied economic research, forecasting, and policy analysis. Its research covers a wide range of topics, including macroeconomics, industry studies, trade policy, and sustainability. The institute is well known for its Quarterly Predictions, one of New Zealand’s longest-running economic forecasting publications, and its Business Confidence Survey, which tracks economic sentiment among businesses. NZIER also conducts cost-benefit analyses and economic impact assessments for both government agencies and private organizations.

It has a staff of more than 30 people and is probably the largest economic research unit in New Zealand outside of government. Most of its work is commercial microeconomic consultancy for businesses. It also does public good work.

Past directors include Alan Bollard and Brian Easton, and a past chair was Ron Trotter.

The Institute owns a MONIAC computer that is currently on loan to the Reserve Bank of New Zealand museum.
