= Douglas Robb (surgeon) =

New Zealand academic (1899–1974)

Sir Douglas Robb CMG
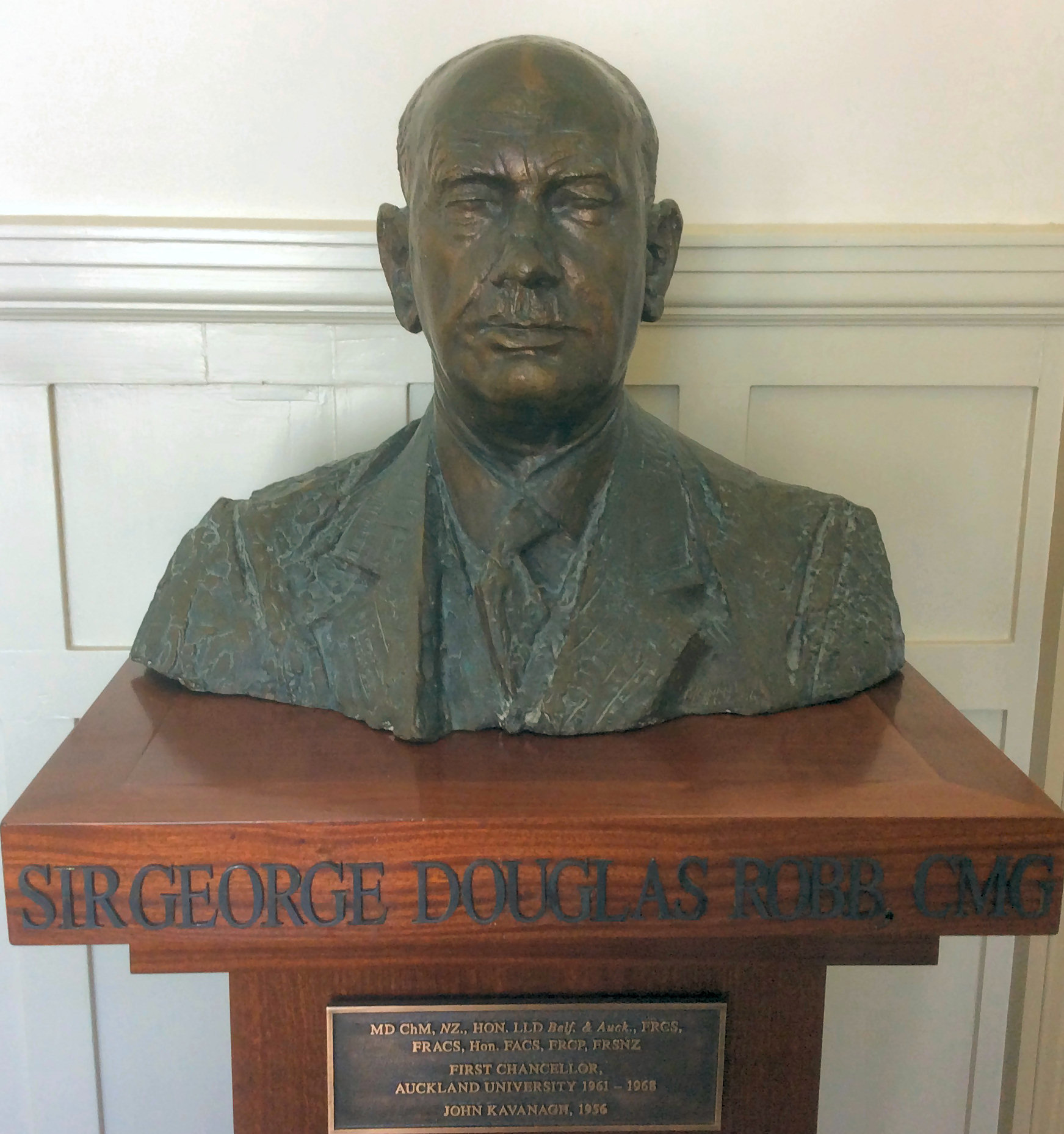
- Bronze bust of Sir Douglas Robb by J. F, Kavanagh. Old Government House, Auckland

2nd Chancellor of the University of Auckland
- In office 1961–1968
- Preceded by: William Cocker
- Succeeded by: Henry Cooper

Personal details
- Born: George Douglas Robb; 29 April 1899 Auckland, New Zealand
- Died: 28 April 1974 (aged 74) Auckland, New Zealand
- Spouse: Helen Seabrook (m. 1946)
- Occupation: Cardiothoracic surgeon; university administrator

Academic background
- Education: University of Otago (ChM, MD)

Academic work
- Discipline: Cardiothoracic surgery
- Institutions: Green Lane Hospital; University of Auckland

Sir George Douglas Robb CMG (1899–1974) was a New Zealand surgeon, medical reformer, writer, and university chancellor.

== Career ==
Robb was born at Auckland on 29 April 1899 and educated at the Auckland Grammar School and at the University of Otago (MB ChB). Robb had a reputation as something of a maverick and a rebel against the conventional medical establishment, as is discussed in a chapter in Brian Easton's book The Nationbuilders.

Robb was influential in the formation of the Auckland Medical School as part of the University of Auckland. From 1961 to 1962, he held the year-long position of President of the British Medical Association.

A series of annual lectures at the University of Auckland has been named after Doug Robb.

In 1953, Robb was awarded the Queen Elizabeth II Coronation Medal. In the 1956 New Year Honours, he was appointed a Companion of the Order of St Michael and St George. He was made a Knight Bachelor in the 1960 Queen's Birthday Honours.

== Personal life ==
Robb was a close friend of the New Zealand poet and writer A. R. D. Fairburn, whose "To a Friend in the Wilderness" was dedicated to Robb. On 6 November 1935, Robb married Helen Seabrook of Auckland. His autobiography, Medical Odyssey was published in 1967 by Collins Bros. & Co. Ltd., Auckland. Appendix 1 (4 pp.) contains a bibliography of Robb's surgical and medical articles and other writings. W. B. Sutch wrote of Robb: "Robb, unhappy with the politicians, became a foremost thoracic surgeon, and a leader in medical education and research."--The Quest for Security in New Zealand, 1840–1966; Oxford, 1966; p. 248.

There is a bronze head (1956) and portrait (1961) of Sir Douglas Robb by John Francis Kavanagh in the University of Auckland Art Collection.

Douglas Robb died in his sleep on the morning of his 75th birthday. His widow, Lady Robb, died in the 1979 Mount Erebus disaster.
