= Murdoch =

Origin
- Meaning: mariner; sea-warrior; sea-ruler
- Region of origin: Ireland; Scotland

Murdoch (/ˈmɜːrdɒk/ MUR-dok, UK also /-dəx/ -dəkh) is a Scottish and Irish surname and given name. An Anglicized form of the Gaelic personal names Muireadhach 'mariner', Murchadh 'sea-warrior', and Muircheartach 'sea-ruler', the first element in each being muir 'sea'. Notable people with the name include:

== Given name ==
- Murdoch Stewart, Duke of Albany, Scottish nobleman
- Murdoch Dickie (1919–2004), Scottish footballer
- Murdoch Macdonald, British politician and civil engineer
- Murdoch MacLennan (born 1949), British media executive
- Murdoch McKenzie - several people

== Surname ==
- Alexi Murdoch, Scottish-born singer
- Alfred Murdoch (1877–1960), New Zealand politician
- Alister Murdoch, Australian air marshal
- Andrew Murdoch - several people
- Arthur Murdoch (1882–1960), British boxer
- Beamish Murdoch, judge and historian of Nova Scotia
- Ben Murdoch-Masila, New Zealand Rugby League player
- Billy Murdoch, Australian cricketer
- Billy Murdoch (Scottish footballer)
- Blair Murdoch, Canadian television producer
- Bobby Murdoch, Scottish footballer
- Bradley John Murdoch, Australian murderer
- Brian H. Murdoch (1930–2020), Irish mathematician
- Clinton Murdoch, clerk and civil servant
- Colin Murdoch, New Zealand pharmacist and veterinarian who invented disposable hypodermic syringes
- David Murdoch – several people including
  - David Murdoch, Scottish sportsman
- Dick Murdoch, American professional wrestler
- Don Murdoch, National Hockey League player
- Elisabeth Murdoch, daughter of Rupert Murdoch
- Dame Elisabeth Murdoch, philanthropist, wife of Sir Keith Murdoch and mother of Rupert Murdoch
- Francis B. Murdoch (1805–1882) was an American attorney and newspaper publisher
- George Murdoch, first mayor of Calgary, Alberta, Canada
- Gilbert Hugh Murdoch, Canadian politician
- Dame Iris Murdoch, Irish novelist and philosopher
- Ivon Murdoch (1892–1964), Australian Army officer during World War I
- James Murdoch – several people including
  - James Murdoch (born 1972), British-American businessman
- John E. Murdoch, American historian and philosopher of science
- John Smith Murdoch, Australian architect
- Sir Keith Murdoch, Australian journalist and father of Rupert Murdoch
- Keith Murdoch (rugby union) (1943–2018), New Zealand rugby union footballer
- Lachlan Murdoch, former chief operating officer of News Corporation and eldest son of Rupert Murdoch
- Lachlan Murdoch, Canadian actor
- Lesley Murdoch (born 1956), New Zealand former cricketer and field hockey player
- Marion Murdoch (1849–?), American minister
- Mary Murdoch (1864–1916), Scottish-born physician and suffragist
- Nina Murdoch (1890–1976), Australian writer
- Patrick Murdoch, author, publisher, and mathematician
- Paul Murdoch (born 1973), Australian former professional boxer
- Richard Murdoch, British comedian and light actor
- Robert C. Murdoch, New Zealand malacologist
- Ronald Murdoch (born 1945), New Zealand former cricketer
- Rupert Murdoch, Australian-American media mogul, CEO and Chairman of News Corporation
- Sarah Murdoch (born 1972), British-Australian model, actress, and television presenter
- Sean Murdoch (born 1986), Scottish former professional football goalkeeper
- Steven Murdoch, Professor of Security Engineering in the Computer Science Department, University College London
- Stuart Murdoch (football manager), former footballer and ex-manager of Milton Keynes Dons F.C.
- Stuart Murdoch (musician), Scottish singer
- Thomas Murdoch - several people
- Trevor Murdoch, American professional wrestler (unrelated to Dick Murdoch above)
- Walter Murdoch, Australian academic and essayist
- Wendi Deng Murdoch (born 1968), Chinese-born American entrepreneur and socialite
- William Murdoch – several people, including:
  - William McMaster Murdoch, first officer on the RMS Titanic
  - William Murdoch, Scottish engineer and inventor of gas lighting (sometimes spelt "Murdock")
  - William Murdoch (poet), Scottish poet

== Fictional characters ==
- Detective William Murdoch, the protagonist in a series of novels by Maureen Jennings, and a spin-off television series
- Murdoch, a tender engine character in Thomas & Friends
- Matt Murdock, Marvel Comics character also known as Daredevil
- John Murdoch, the protagonist of Alex Proyas's 1998 tech noir film Dark City
- H.M. Murdock, one of the four lead characters from The A-Team
- Murdoc, antagonist from MacGyver.
- Murdoc Niccals, bassist from the fictional band Gorillaz.

== See also ==
- Murdoch (disambiguation)
- Murdoch family
- Murdaugh
- Murdock
- Muirchertach
- Murtagh
- Muireadhach I, Earl of Menteith, Scottish nobleman
- Muireadhach II, Earl of Menteith, Scottish nobleman
- Muireadhach III, Earl of Menteith, Scottish nobleman
- Murdoc, a character in the MacGyver television series
- Murdoc Niccals, bassist for the virtual band Gorillaz
