= Angove =

Angove is a Cornish surname. This surname originates from the Cornish language, a Celtic language, and is common in Cornwall. The name is a compound of the definite article "an" i.e. the, plus the word "gov", meaning smith, and is thus an equivalent of the English surname Smith. In the 1881 UK census the surname Angove was restricted to Cornwall and the proportion of people with the surname Smith was much lower in Cornwall than elsewhere the UK. The name was originally an occupational name and denoted a metal worker, it is the most common Cornish occupational surname. During the 16th century the surname was limited to the western half of Cornwall where Cornish was still spoken.

The name may refer to

People:

- Damien Angove (born 18 December 1970), a former Australian rules footballer who played with the Sydney Swans in the Australian Football League
- David Angove (born 7 March 1974), a former cricketer who played for Cornwall Cricket Club
- Thomas Angove (1918 – 30 March 2010), an Australian winemaker credited with the invention of the wine cask.
- Trevor Angove (born 15 January 1959), a former cricketer for Cornwall Cricket Club

Places:

- Angove Conservation Park, a protected area located about 16 kilometres (9.9 miles) north-east of the Adelaide city centre within the local government area of the City of Tea Tree Gully.
- Angove Lake, a permanent freshwater lake in the Great Southern region of Western Australia.
- Angove River, or Angove Creek, a river located in the Great Southern region of Western Australia most of the river is found within Two Peoples Bay Nature Reserve.

== See also ==
- An Gof
