= Murdock =

Murdock is a surname. A relatively modern iteration of the Irish or Scottish name Murdoch. Notable people with the surname include:

- Andrew Murdock (born 1962), American record producer
- Andrew G. Murdock (fl. 2000s), botanist whose official abbreviation is "Murdock", who described the fern genus Ptisana
- Beatrice Murdock (died 2004), American politician
- Bennet Murdock (1925–2022), American psychologist
- Colin Murdock (born 1975), Northern Irish footballer
- David H. Murdock (1923–2025), American businessman
- Deroy Murdock, American syndicated columnist
- Dorothy M. Murdock, better known by pen name Acharya S, author and proponent of the Christ myth theory
- Eric Murdock, American basketball player
- George Peter Murdock, American anthropologist known for his empirical approach to ethnological studies
- George Murdock, American actor
- Ian Murdock, founder and former leader of the Debian Linux Distribution
- J. Edgar Murdock (1894–1977), American jurist
- James Murdock (disambiguation), various people
- Joseph Murdock (disambiguation), various people
- Kirk Radomski (known to players as Murdock), New York Mets employee
- Mackenzie Murdock (born 1989), American voice actor and writer
- Mike Murdock, American televangelist and pastor
- Murdock, Portuguese footballer
- Orrice Abram Murdock, Jr., American politician from Utah
- Red Murdock (born 2003), American football player
- Roger E. Murdock, American police officer
- Sharon Murdock, Canadian politician
- Shirley Murdock, American R&B singer
- William Murdock, American politician
- William Murdoch, also spelled Murdock, early-nineteenth century Scottish engineer

== Fictional characters ==
- Murdock, the fictional main antagonist in Carland Cross
- Buz Murdock, fictional character from the TV series Route 66
- H.M. "Howling Mad" Murdock, character played by the actor Dwight Schultz in the 1980s television series The A-Team
- Roger Murdock, character from Airplane!, played by Kareem Abdul-Jabbar
- Buck Murdock, character from Airplane II: The Sequel, played by William Shatner

=== Marvel Comics ===
- Matthew Murdock, the given name of the Marvel Comics superhero Daredevil of Earth-616 and namesake of the Netflix series Daredevil
- Mike Murdock, Matt Murdock's magically created twin brother
- Jack Murdock, Matt's and Mike's father
- Maggie Murdock, Matt's and Mike's mother
- Matthew Murdock, the given name of the Kingpin of Earth-65

== See also ==
- Maddock (surname)
- Murdoc
- Murdoch
