= Murdock (disambiguation) =

Murdock is a surname.

Murdock may also refer to:

== Place names ==
Australia

- Murdock Island (Queensland)

Canada

- Murdock River, Ontario

United States

- Murdock, Florida
- Murdock, Illinois
- Murdock, Indiana
- Murdock, Minnesota
- Murdock, Nebraska
- Murdock-Portal Elementary School, San Jose, California

== Other uses ==
- A common nickname for someone who is an expert in the field of Magic (illusion)
