= Dave Crowe =

New Zealand cricketer (1933–2000)

Personal information
- Full name: David William Crowe
- Born: 18 October 1933; Blenheim, New Zealand
- Died: 12 May 2000 (aged 66); Auckland, New Zealand
- Batting: Left-handed
- Bowling: Legbreak
- Role: Batsman
- Relatives: Jeff Crowe (son); Martin Crowe (son); Russell Crowe (nephew)

Domestic team information
- Years: Team
- 1953/54: Wellington
- 1957/58: Canterbury
- FC debut: 25 December 1953 Wellington v Central Districts
- Last FC: 3 January 1958 Canterbury v Central Districts

Career statistics
Competition	First-class
Matches	3
Runs scored	55
Batting average	11.00
100s/50s	0/0
Top score	19
Catches/stumpings	0/0
- Source: CricInfo, 30 May 2009

David William Crowe (18 October 1933 – 12 May 2000) was a New Zealand cricketer who played three first class matches for Canterbury and Wellington between 1953 and 1958. He was the father of New Zealand international Test and One Day International players Martin Crowe and Jeff Crowe; and uncle of the actor Russell Crowe. In Cornwall Park there is a bench where his ashes were scattered, along with his friend Zac, overlooking the ground on which he played for Cornwall Cricket Club, where he also coached, captained and finally was president from 1995 to 1999.

Martin Crowe recalled in 2011: “A former county pro, Les Townsend, was once watching dad play at Cornwall and told him harshly ‘You’ll never make a Test cricketer, son’. About 30 years later, dad met up with him again by chance and said: ‘Les, remember when you told me I’d never make a Test cricketer? Well, I made two!"
