= David Murdoch (disambiguation) =

David Murdoch (born 1978) was a Scottish curler.

David Murdoch may also refer to:

- David Murdoch (academic), New Zealand medical researcher and academic administrator
- David Murdoch (banker) (1825–1911), New Zealand banker
- David Murdoch (politician) (1887–1960), New Zealand politician
- David Murdoch MacPherson (1847–1915), Canadian manufacturer and political figure

== See also ==
- David H. Murdock (1923–2025), American businessman and philanthropist
- Murdoch (disambiguation)
