= William Murdoch (disambiguation) =

William Murdoch (1754–1839) was a Scottish engineer and inventor.

William Murdoch may also refer to:

- William Murdoch (bishop) (born 1949), American Anglican bishop
- William Murdoch (pianist) (1888–1942), Australian concert pianist
- William Murdoch (poet) (1823–1887), Canadian poet
- William Murdoch (politician) (1904–1984), Speaker of the Ontario Legislature, 1960–1963
- William Gordon Burn Murdoch (1862–1939), Scottish painter, travel writer and explorer
- William McMaster Murdoch (1873–1912), RMS Titanic's First Officer
- William W. Murdoch (born 1939), professor of population ecology at the University of California, Santa Barbara
- W.C.W. Murdoch (1914–1987), Scottish rugby player
- Billy Murdoch (1854–1911), Australian cricket's greatest batsman of the 19th century
- Billy Murdoch (footballer) (born 1949), Scottish footballer for Stenhousemuir and Kilmarnock

== In fiction ==
- Detective William Murdoch, the investigator in Murdoch Mysteries

== See also ==
- William Murdock (c. 1720–1769), Maryland colonial rights proponent
