= Cornwall Park, Auckland =

Parkland in Epsom, Auckland, New Zealand

Cornwall Park
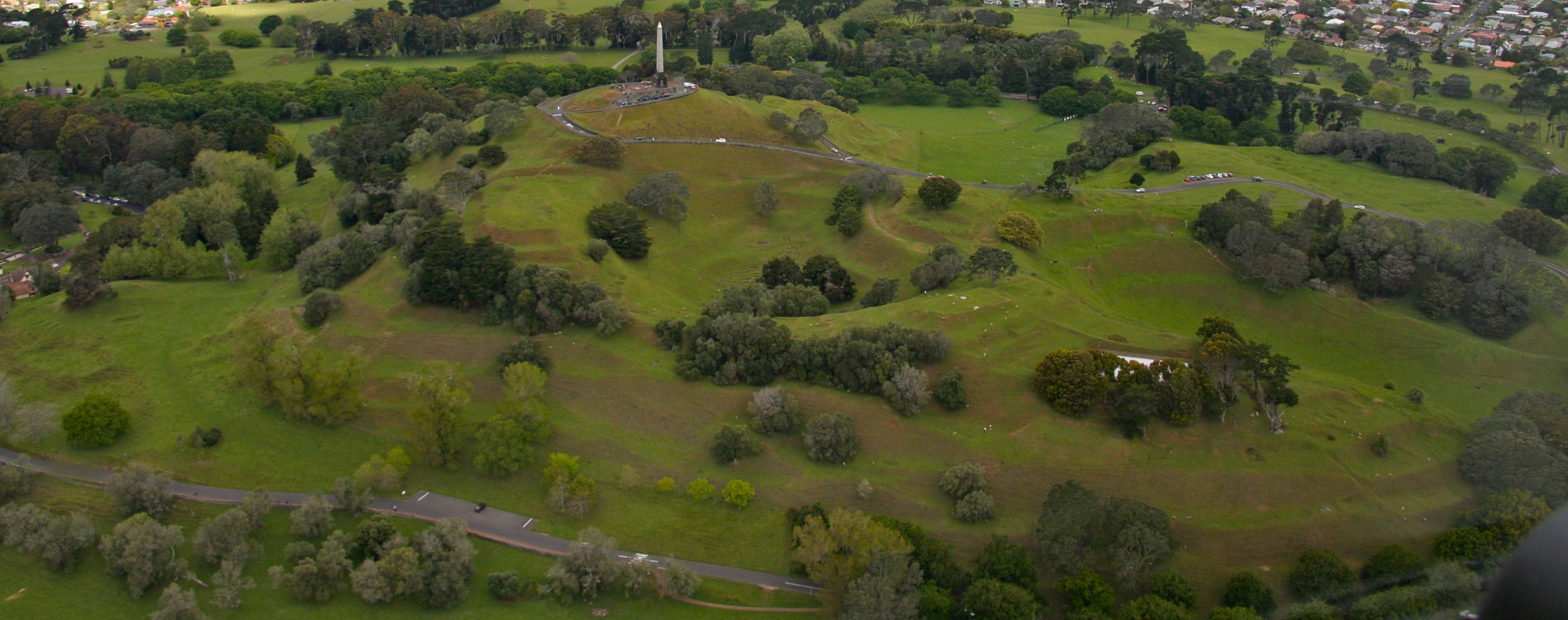
- One Tree Hill near the heart of Cornwall Park

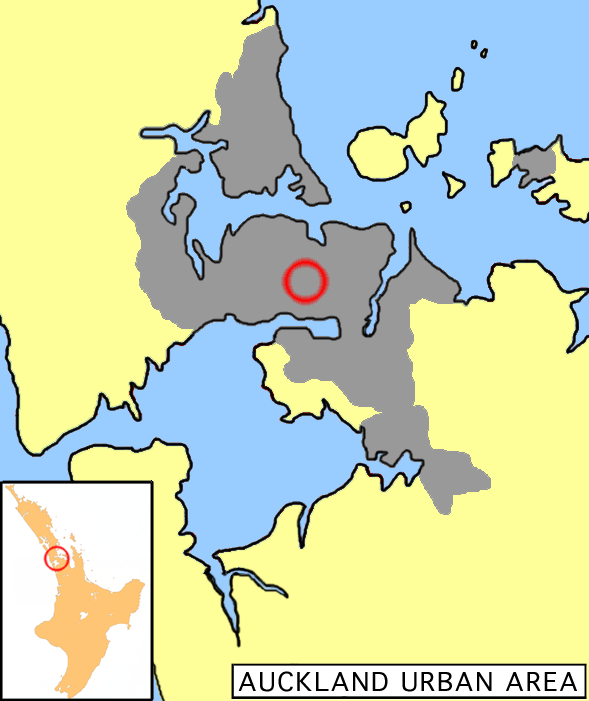
- location within Auckland
- Type: Park open to the public owned by Cornwall Park Trust
- Location: Epsom, Auckland, New Zealand
- Coordinates: 36°53′54″S 174°47′05″E
- Area: 670 acres (270 hectares)
- Created: 1901
- Operator: Cornwall Park Trust
- Status: Open year round during daylight
- Website: www.cornwallpark.co.nz

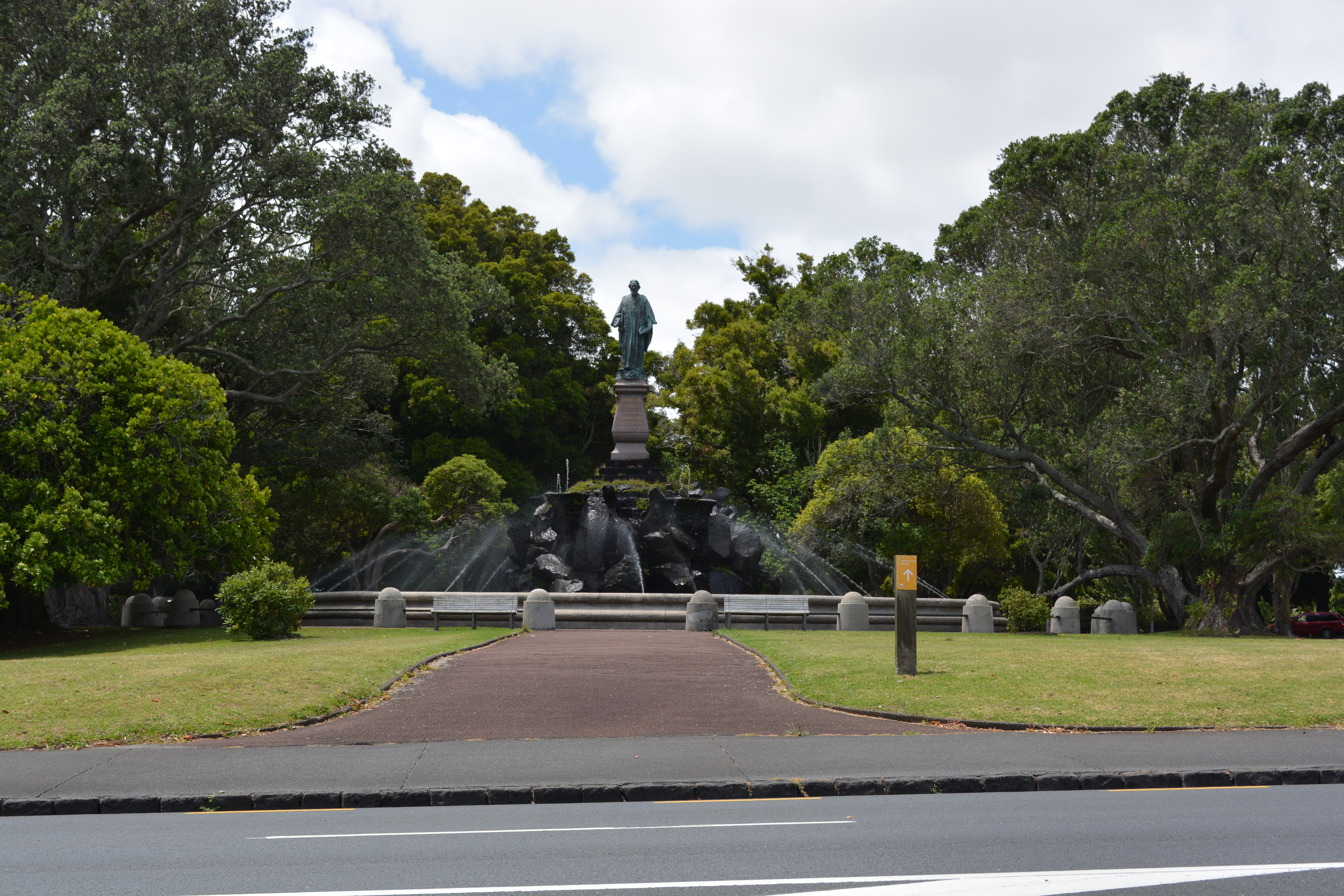
Sir John Logan Campbell's statue at Cornwall Park's formal entrance in Epsom at 308—312 Manukau Road. Access is on either side of the statue by Campbell Crescent to Puriri Drive

Cornwall Park is an expansive parkland in Epsom near the heart of Auckland, New Zealand, surrounding the park containing Maungakiekie Pā or the hill of One Tree Hill. The two independent parks form one large park of 670 acres (270 hectares).

The Park has centuries-old heritage sites, wide-open spaces, tree lined avenues and walks, places of peace and tranquility in a large city, sports grounds including tennis and bowls and a working farm for the education of city children.

John Logan Campbell, Auckland resident since 1840 and, at the time of this gift, mayor, gave the park's 230 acres to a private trust on 10 June 1901.

Campbell chose to present the deeds the following day to the visiting heir to the throne, the Duke of Cornwall and York later George V asking his consent for it to be named Cornwall Park in honour of the Duke. A few weeks later the adjoining Alexandra Park was named in honour of the Duke's mother.

The farm features sheep and a Simmental cattle stud, with around 60 breeding cows. Bull calves are sold to dairy farmers around the North Island to use for breeding.

== Origin ==
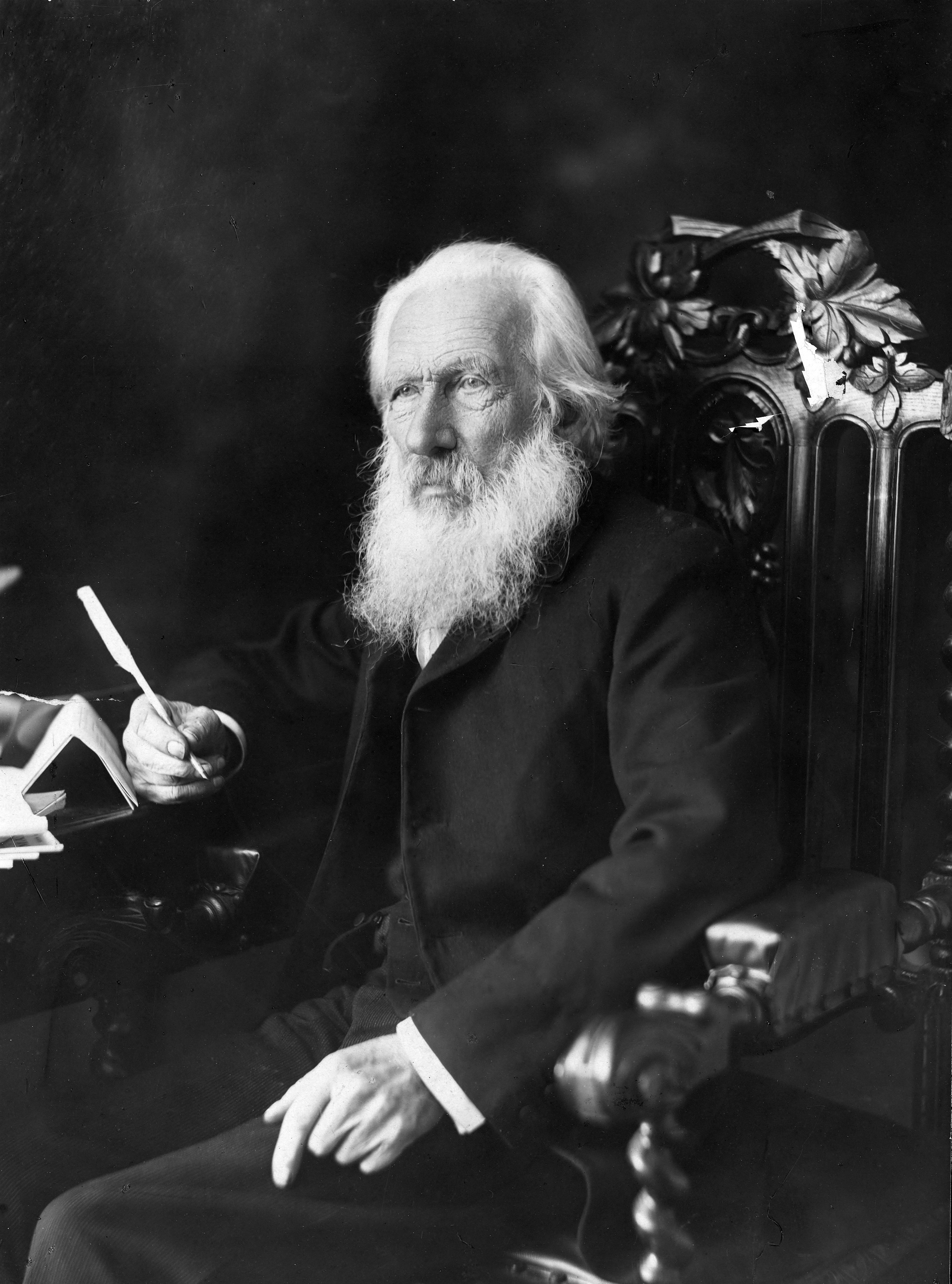
Sir John Logan Campbell

=== Land ===
Campbell gave the land to Cornwall Park Trust, a trust he had established for the purpose. The park was described at the time as "two hundred and thirty acres of the finest land in the district", or 93 hectares, a portion of some 1,100 acres (450 hectares) at One Tree Hill bought by Dr Campbell many years before. He had planned to build a house there and planted the parkland in preparation for that but he subsequently chose to live near the centre of the city in Parnell, his home was named 'Kilbryde' and situated on part of the site of their rose gardens. Still marked by his trees the carriage drive he made in Cornwall Park sweeps in an S-bend from Puriri Drive across Greenlane west of the Park's Greenlane entrance to his house site near Huia Lodge. Visitors may walk along it from the gate opposite the Park's administration and works depot in Greenlane. There were to be further gifts including the land about Puriri Drive and Campbell Crescent and the endowment lands, housing sites to be made available on 21-year leases.

Cornwall Park’s land extends beyond the park itself into the surrounding neighbourhoods. This land is on the periphery of the park and is leased by Cornwall Park to fund the maintenance and upkeep of the park. This ensures the park remains free for all to use. The Sir John Logan Campbell Residuary Estate continues his philanthropic legacy by distributing income annually to charities and community organisations. There are more than 90 residential, recreational, and commercial leasehold properties within or surrounding the park. All residential leases are in perpetuity.

Opposition to ground rent increases has led to court cases focusing on the interpretation of the lease terms, the methodology of valuation, and the fairness of the rent review process.

=== Cornwall Park Trust ===
The deeds handed to the trustees stated "the said lands are and shall be held by the Trustees on trust for the people of the colony of New Zealand, and also for such public purposes for the general benefit of the people of New Zealand in the way of affording them recreation, enjoyment, pleasure and instruction and other similar benefits and advantages of that nature as the Trustees shall from time to time consider best."

=== Management ===
The trustees, acting through The Cornwall Park Trust Board Inc, also manage the Campbell Trust. Until 2012 they also managed the One Tree Hill Domain on behalf of the Auckland Council. Their One Tree Hill Domain responsibility has ceased and Ngā Mana Whenua o Tāmaki Makaurau Collective decides upon and implements its own policies on Maungakiekie/One Tree Hill Domain.

The first Cornwall Park trustees were David Murdoch, Arthur Myers (chairman), Robert Hall and Alfred Bankart.

==== Chairmen of Trustees ====
- A M Myers (1901–1926)
- A S Bankart (1926–1927)
- J H Gunson (1927–1956)
- A U Wells (1956–1974)
- B P Stevenson (1975–1983)
- K B Myers (1983–1991)
- R H L Ferguson (1991–2007)
- H M Horton (2007–2011)
- J L Clark (2011–2017)
- J A W McConnell (2017–2020)
- A F Young-Cooper (2020–2023)
- John Duncan (2023–2025)
- A F Young-Cooper (2025–2026)
- A K Carruthers (2026–present)

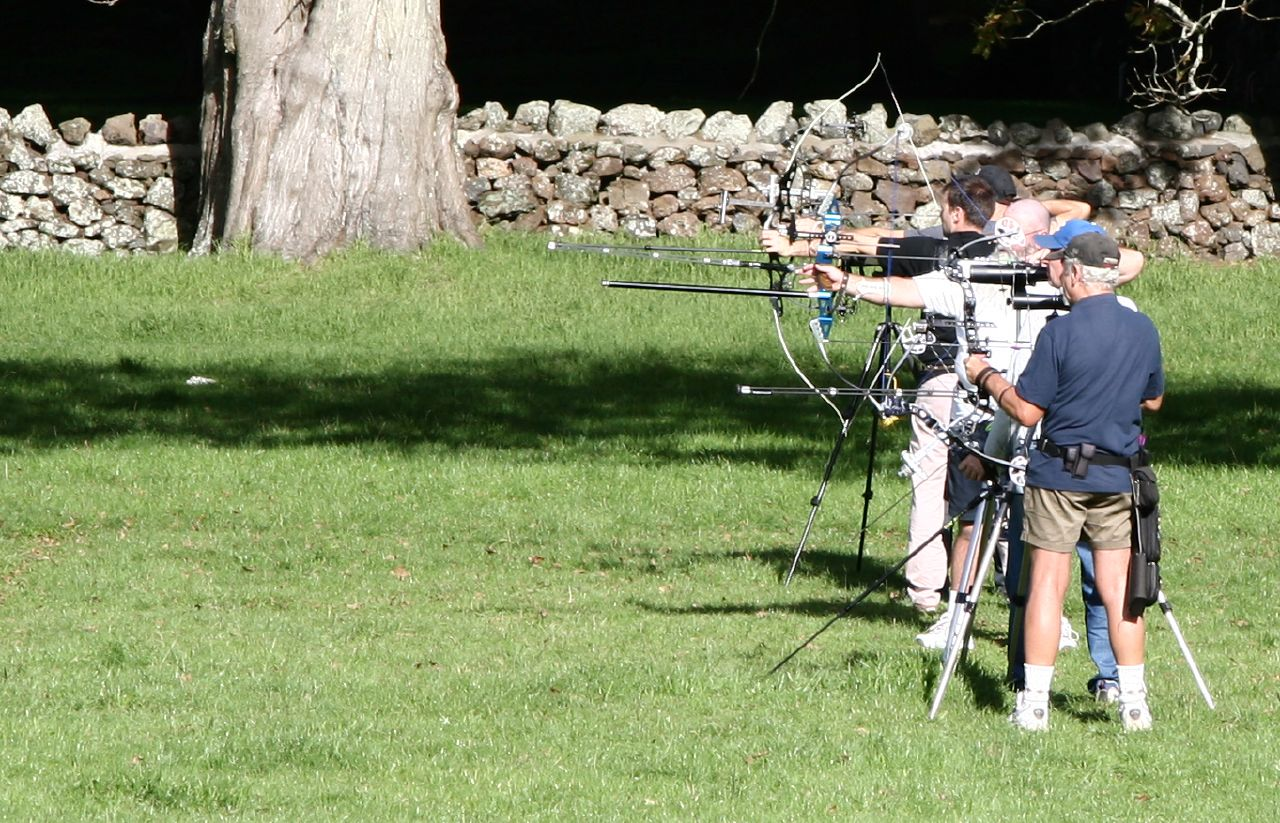
Archery

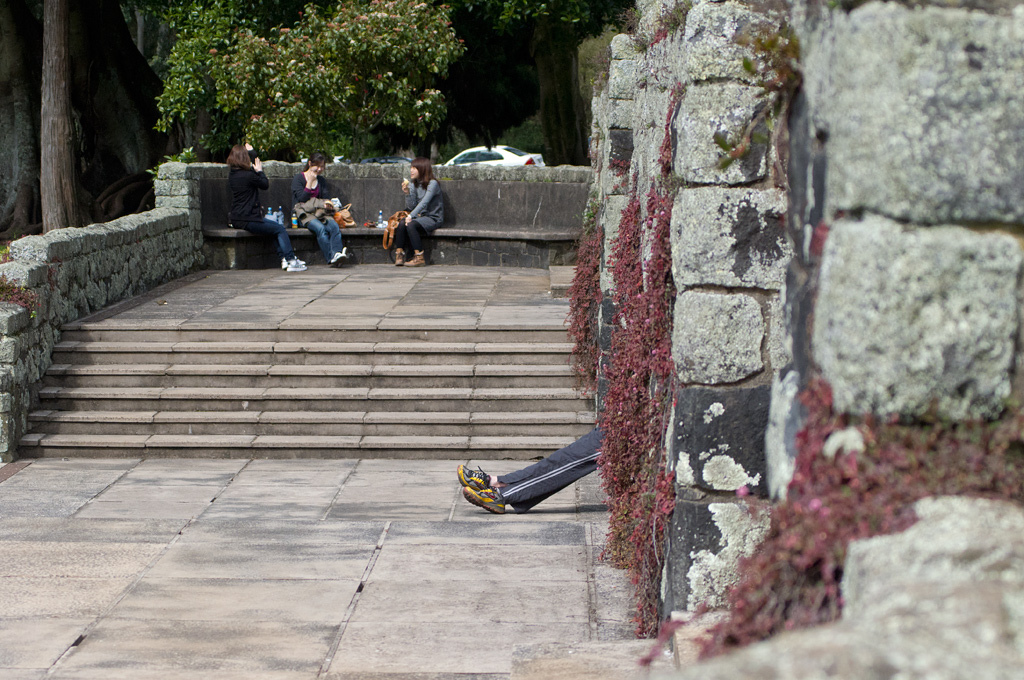
on Memorial Steps

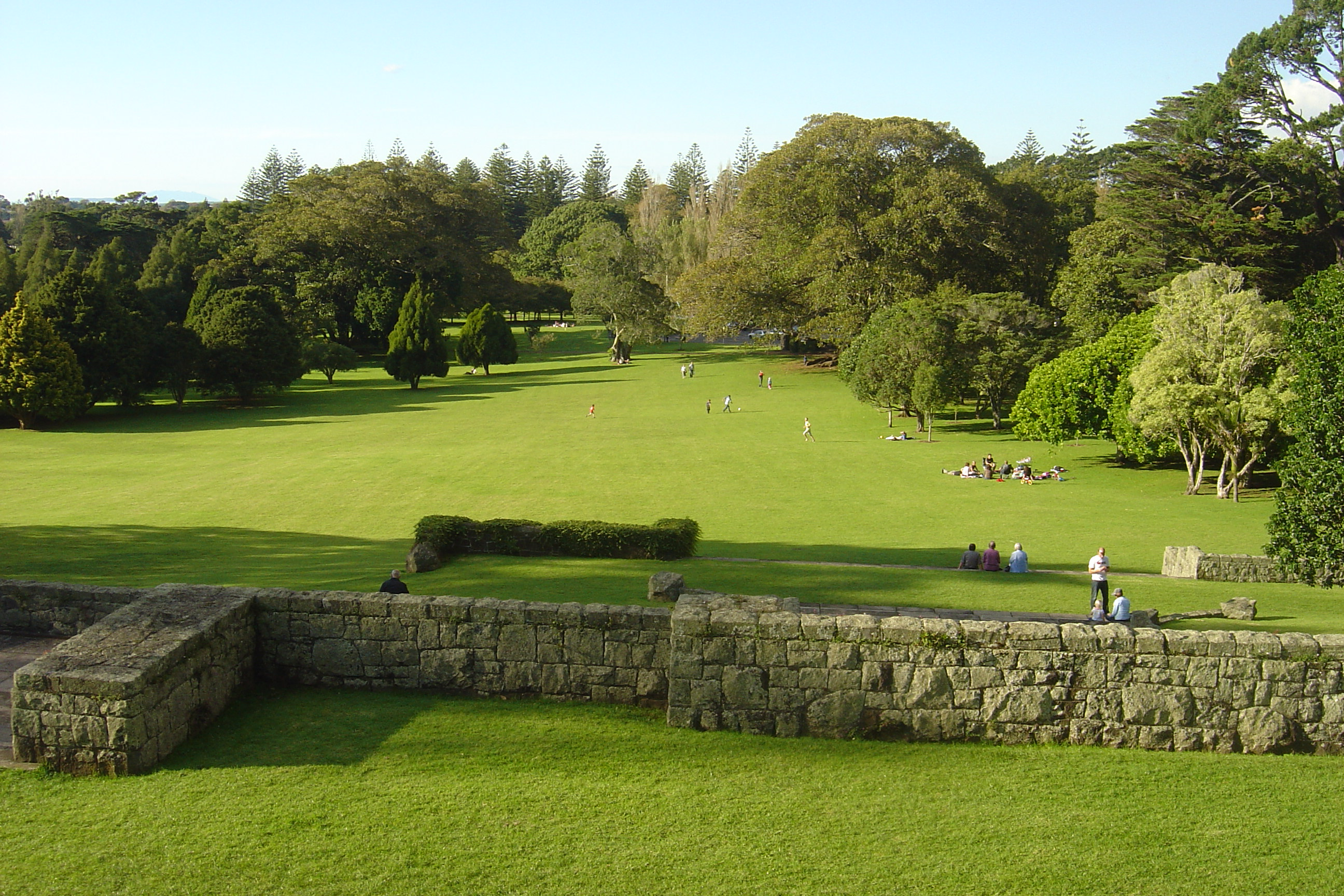
vista from Memorial Steps

=== Design ===
A scheme was laid out by young landscape designer Austin Strong (1881–1952) (Note: Austin Strong, a step-grandson of Robert Louis Stevenson, was born in San Francisco and grew up in Hawaii, Samoa and Wellington New Zealand where he attended Wellington College. He studied landscape architecture in New York, was chosen to design Cornwall Park and completed the commission. He subsequently became a successful New York playwright. Source Joseph Theroux, Nantucket Historical Association) inspired by Golden Gate Park in San Francisco.

Ongoing design is managed by New York-based landscape architecture firm Nelson Byrd Woltz Landscape Architects in collaboration with New Zealand-based Boffa Miskell.

=== Endowment ===
In 1907 a second gift of 104 acres (42 hectares) and the following year another 143 acres (58 hectares) for endowment to be let on building leases to create income to help with the park's upkeep. Together these new gifts made a total area of 477 acres (193 hectares) within Cornwall Park. Combined with the adjoining almost encircled city-owned One Tree Hill Domain of 130 acres (53 hectares) there was now one Park of 607 acres (246 hectares).

However the trustees were personally liable for any expenditure that could not be met by the trust's funds and so in 1914 residential sites along Wheturangi Road were sold on long term lease to meet immediate needs for cash and the trustees asked that local bodies give consideration to some form of rate relief complaining that over 60 per cent of the trusts revenue went in taxes. St Cuthbert's College took 8 acres by the formal entrance on a 99-year building lease in 1919. After many years of petitions and representations from Auckland to Parliament in 1922 Parliament decided that the Cornwall Park land should be valued for rating purposes at its "restricted value", this valuation of the park having regard to its income as grazing land. By this time the capital value of the Park's land exceeded £200,000.

As the Great Depression began to subside and New Zealand's new government began to change policies there was a leap in the Government's assessment for the park's land tax from £300 to £1,400. One Tree Hill Borough's councillors agreed to apply to the Government for the Government's consent to exempt the Park from payment of their rates on the Park's land. The Government agreed and passed enabling legislation in September 1938.

In 1952 following the death of his only daughter Campbell's remaining estate, then valued at £400,000, passed under the control of the Cornwall Park Trustees and the income is allocated according to Campbell's wishes to a wide range of purposes.

Income received by the trustees from the trust's property is exempt from Income Tax.

=== Restrictions ===
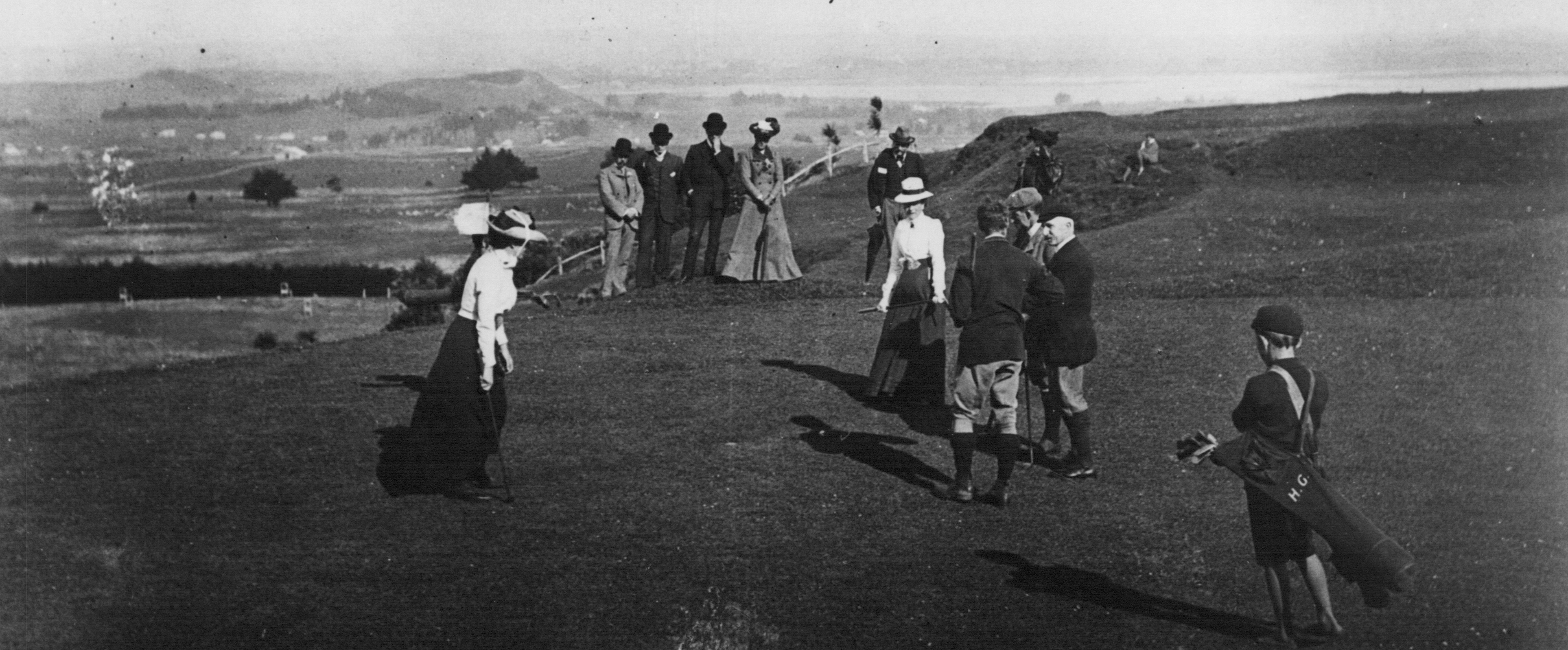
Golfers playing on Maungakiekie / One Tree Hill in the early 1900s

No more riding or golf

Soon after the beginning of World War II riding and golf were banned. Horses for the damage to lawns, although tracks were provided, and golf for the annoyance and danger to sheep grazing in the park. Subsequently it was decided that golf was not a use available to the people generally and did not comply with the trust deed and the Auckland Golf Club's and Maungakiekie Golf Club's privileges were ended. In any case the trust deed required construction of "Grand Avenue" through the land at present used for golf.

=== Cornwall Hospital ===
From 1942 to 1945 the park was occupied by the nation's defence forces as a site of temporary barracks and a temporary hospital was built for the United States Army in the eastern area of Cornwall Park. Initially for 1050 patients and their 715 attendants — the U.S. 39th General Hospital — it was very shortly doubled in capacity to 2,000 beds. There were 122 separate buildings with a floor area of 8 acres, built in just over 6 weeks during a wet winter on 34 acres (14 hectares) of the park.

In 1944 the Government proposed to compulsorily acquire a portion of the land to build a home for blinded ex-servicemen. It was protested that in June 1942 an undertaking had been given that the area would not be used for other than war purposes but to no avail whatsoever. The hospital buildings became Cornwall Hospital and included maternity facilities, National Women's Hospital, and a geriatric hospital. All buildings on the site were demolished in 1975. The hospital for blinded servicemen remains in the adjoining Park Maungakiekie/One Tree Hill Domain, and is known as Sorrento in the Park, an events venue.

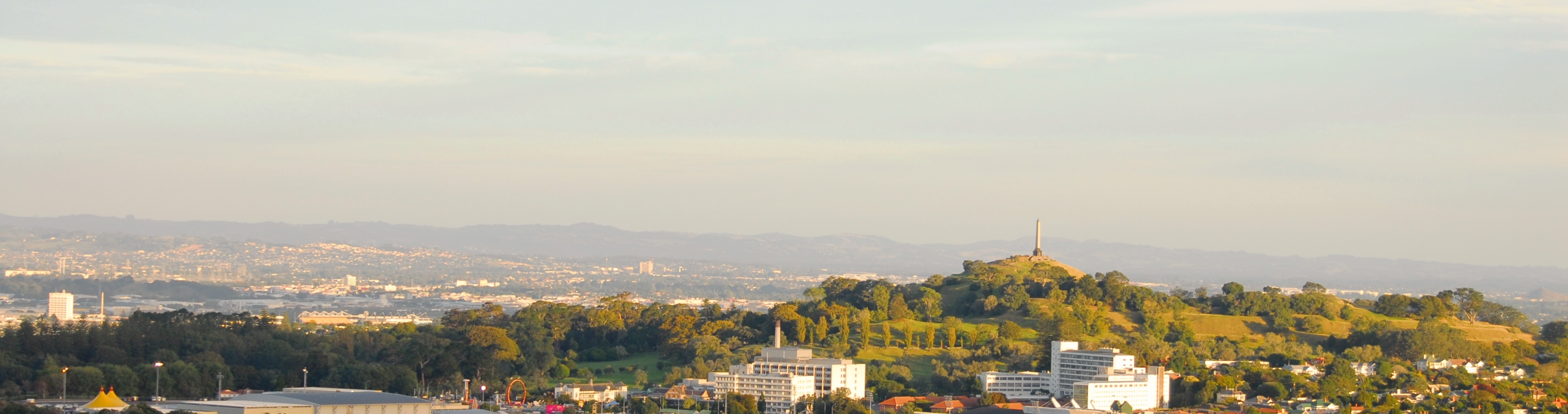
A large part of Cornwall Park showing the obelisk and One Tree Hill Domain spreading beyond the showgrounds and the tall white buildings of Greenlane Clinical Centre. The camera is on Mt Eden

== Activities ==
On top of admiring scenery, drinking tea while the Band plays on its rotunda, picnicking, birdwatching, walking, jogging, bicycling, keeping the dog secure on its leash and admiring the ewes and their lambs, provisions for formalised activities include:

- Tennis: Campbell Park Tennis Club
- Cricket: Cornwall Cricket Club
- Rugby union: Grammar Carlton RFC is based here
- Rugby league: The headquarters of the Auckland Rugby League
- Archery located in neighboring Park Maungakiekie/One Tree Hill Domian: Auckland Archery
- Lawn bowls: Carlton Cornwall Bowls
- Parkrun: parkrun New Zealand

== Publications ==
The Cornwall Park Trust Board's publications include:

- Poenamo Revisited, (2012) a facsimile of the 1898 edition of Campbell's autobiography with new annotations and many pictures.
- Cornwall Park, the Story of a Man's Vision
- Reminiscences of a Long Life, Sir John Logan Campbell, edited and introduced by R.C.J. Stone, 2017.

Brochures

Sir John Logan Campbell
Cornwall Park
Cornwall Park Heritage Trail

Cornwall Park Tree Trail
Cornwall Park Bird Species
Cornwall Park Farm

Acacia Cottage
Huia Lodge
Cornwall Hospital 1942–1975
