= Thomas Murdoch =

Thomas Murdoch may refer to:

- Thomas Murdoch (engineer) (1876–1961), Australian military engineer, director general of engineer services during WWII
- Thomas Murdoch (merchant) (1758–1846), Scottish merchant in Madeira
- Thomas Murdoch (politician) (1868–1946), President of the Tasmanian Legislative Council (1937–1944)
