= Thomas Angove =

Australian winemaker

- Born: Thomas William Carlyon Angove; 1918
- Died: 30 March 2010 (aged 91–92)
- Occupations: Winemaker; inventor
- Known for: wine cask

Thomas William Carlyon Angove AM (1918 – 30 March 2010) was an Australian winemaker who is credited with the invention of the wine cask.

== Biography ==
In 1947, Angove, grandson of the founder of Angove Family Winemakers (Dr. William T. Angove) took over as Angove's Pty. Ltd. managing director. He held the position until 1983 when his son John Carlyon Angove succeeded him. He was appointed a Member of the Order of Australia in 1994 for his services to wine making.

Angove died on 30 March 2010 at the age of 92.

== Winemaking ==
The Angove Family Winemakers history began in 1886 when Dr William Angove emigrated to Australia from Cornwall. He established a medical practice at Tea Tree Gully, an Adelaide suburb. Along with other medical doctors at the time, including Dr Lindeman and Dr Penfold, he began cultivating vines and making wine.

In 1910, Dr Angove was succeeded by his son Thomas Carlyon Angove who made the pioneering move to establish a winery at Renmark in the South Australian Riverland. At the time there was no winemaking or distilling activity in the region. Renmark was struggling economically and the winery’s move to the district assured the settlement’s survival.

In the mid 20th century, Angove wine grapes were sourced from its vineyards at Tea Tree Gully while the Renmark operation focused on fortified wine and brandy production. It was evident that the Tea Tree Gully vineyards were under pressure from the local suburban sprawl and so 500 hectares of land near Renmark was purchased with the view to establishing a vineyard to supply winemaking varieties that were not available locally. In 1969, the first plantings occurred there, at the Nanya Vineyard and, fifteen years later, 480 hectares were bearing fruit in what was the first broad-acre vineyard, and the largest in the southern hemisphere at the time. Premium grape varieties dominated the planting mix and the company showed the rest of the industry what could be achieved in the Riverland.

== Brandy making ==
In the early 1920s, T.C. "Skipper" Angove spent time studying the production of brandy in the Cognac region in France. He decided there was a better way to make a clean fresh spirit than the very heavy Muscat style brandies that were common at the time. In 1925, he made the first Angove brandy, using neutral white grape varieties and the traditional double distilled, pot-still process, developed in France centuries earlier.

The result was the beginning of the St Agnes Brandy label. The style revolutionised the Australian brandy market with other distillers following the lead he set. After World War II, Thomas William Carlyon Angove took over from his father as managing director of the company.

== Development of the wine cask ==
In 1964, T. W. C. Angove conceived and developed the first "bag in box", a world first for wine packaging. The original pack was a flexible plastic bag inside a rigid corrugated cardboard box, that allowed the wine to be poured off the top while the plastic then collapsed onto the wine, so producing an airless flow system so vital to the concept. In time, technical advances have seen the "bag in box" revolutionise wine sales internationally.

== See also ==
- Angove
