= Bag-in-box =

Type of container for the storage and transportation of liquids

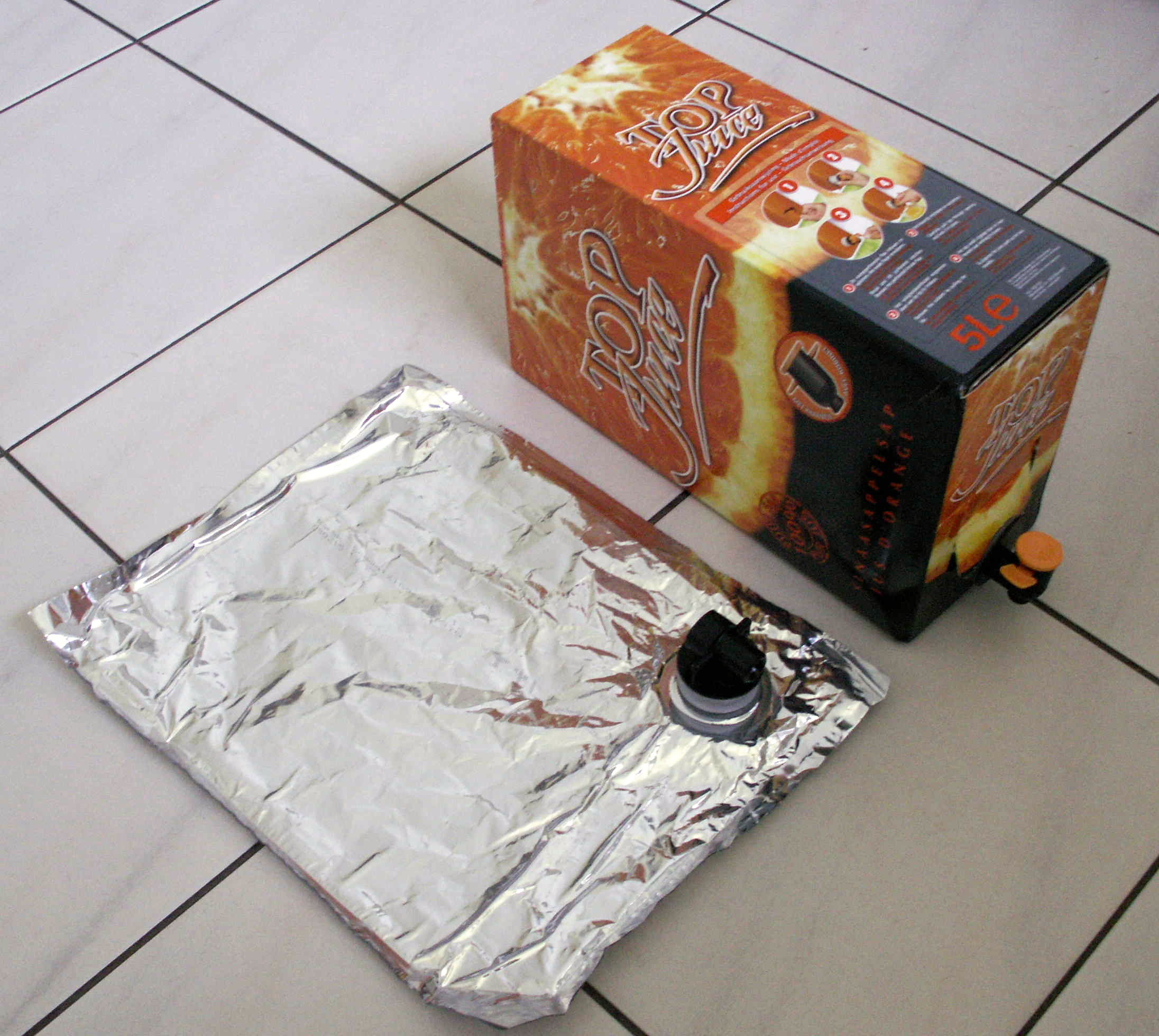
A bladder pack and a complete bag-in-box

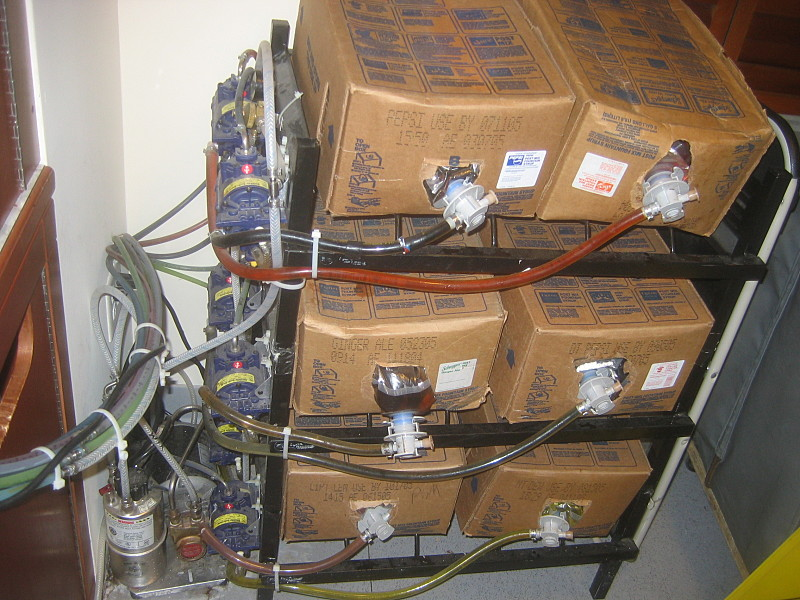
Several bag-in-box containers (here, containing soft drink syrup), connected to a fountain drink system

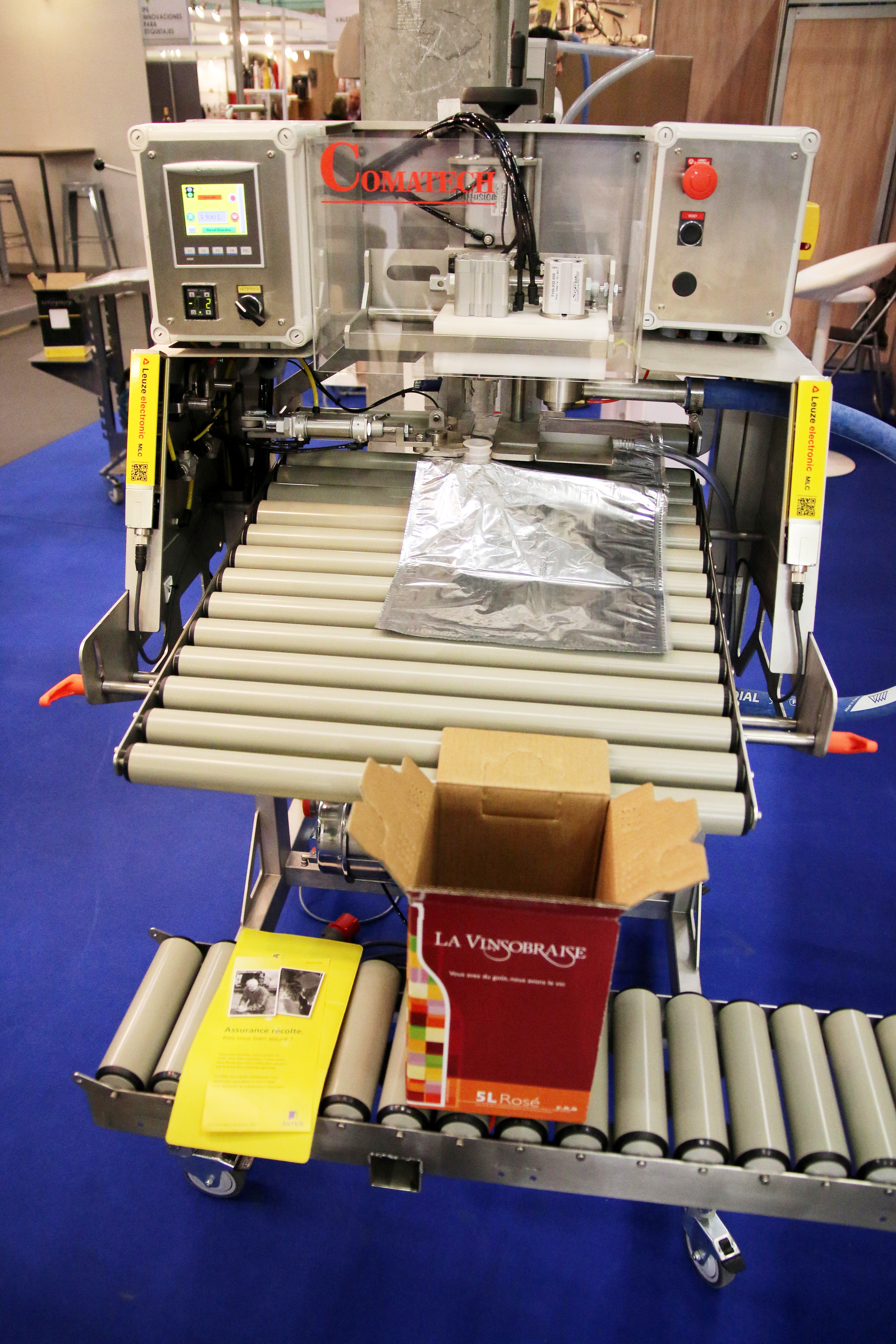
Filling machinery

A bag-in-box or BiB is a container for the storage and transportation of liquids. It consists of a strong bladder (or plastic bag), usually made of several layers of metallised film or other plastics, seated inside a corrugated fiberboard box. The BiB is used because of its easy transportation and ability to dispense liquids. It is mainly used in the food industry for transporting condiments and drinks, for transporting liquid chemicals, and for dispensing fertilizer for various farming practices.

== Features ==
The bag is supplied to the company which will fill it as an empty pre-made bag. The company filling the bag with its product generally removes the tap, fills the bag (with wine, juice or other liquid) and replaces the tap and then the bag is placed in the box.

The bags are available as singles for semi-automatic machines or as web bags, where the bags have perforations between each one. These are used on automated filling systems where the bag is separated on line either before the bag is automatically filled or after. Depending on the end use, there are a number of options that can be used on the bag instead of the tap. The bags can be filled from chilled product temperatures up to 85 °C (185 °F).

BiB packaging can be made using form fill seal (FFS) technology, where the bags are manufactured on-line from reels of film, then the FlexTap is inserted then filled on an integral rotary head filler. The BiB is currently used to package wine, soda fountain syrup products, milk, liquid chemicals, and water.

== History ==
The first commercial BiB system was invented by American chemist William R. Scholle in 1955 for the safe transportation and dispensing of battery acid. In 1991, Scholle was inducted into the "packaging hall of fame" for his invention.

== Uses ==
BiB has many common commercial applications. Among the most common ones are to supply syrup to soft drink fountains and to dispense bulk supplied condiments such as ketchup or mustard in the foodservice industry (especially in fast food outlets). BiB technology is still used for its original application of dispensing sulfuric acid for filling lead-acid batteries in garages and dealerships. As explained further below, BiBs have also been implemented for consumer applications like boxed wine.

For commercial syrup applications, the customer opens one end of the box (sometimes via a pre-scored opening) and connects a compatible connector to a built-in port on the bag to pump out its contents. The port itself contains a one-way valve which opens only under pressure from the attached connector and which prevents contamination of the syrup in the bag. For consumer applications like boxed wine, there is a tap already present on the bag which protrudes through a pre-cut hole on the box, so all the consumer has to do is locate the tap on the outside of the box.

Producers like BiB packaging because it is inexpensive. BiB also offers environmental benefits by allowing contents of 1.5–1,000 litres (0.4–264.2 US gal), so that less packaging or labeling is required. The material it is made from is lighter than the other plastic alternatives, providing it with a better carbon footprint.

One disadvantage of the plastic bags used in BiB technology is that plastic is allegedly less effective than more expensive packaging materials such as stainless steel in preserving the flavor of freshly-made soft drink syrup. McDonald's procures syrup for its soda fountains from The Coca-Cola Company in stainless steel tanks rather than BiBs for this reason.

== Wine cask ==
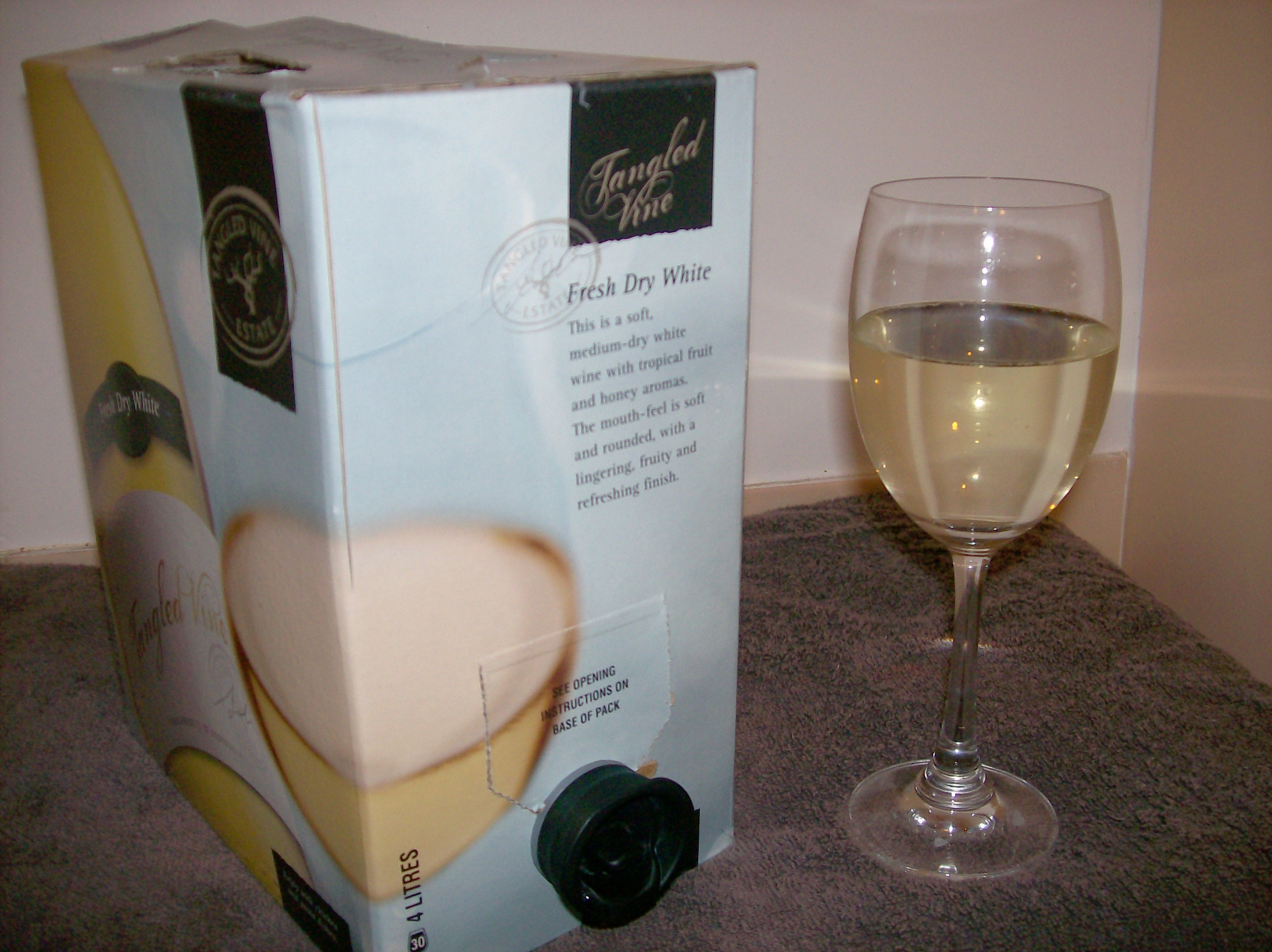
A 4-litre cask of Australian white wine

The 'wine cask' was invented by Thomas Angove (1918–2010) of Angove's, a winemaker from Renmark, South Australia, and patented by the company on April 20, 1964. Polyethylene bladders of 1 imperial gallon (4.55 litres) were put into corrugated boxes for sale to consumers. An original design required that the consumer cut the corner off the bladder inside the box, pour out the desired quantity of wine and then reseal it with a special peg.

In 1967, Charles Malpas and Penfolds Wines patented a plastic, air-tight tap welded into an aluminised film bladder, making storage much more convenient for consumers. All modern wine casks now utilise some sort of plastic tap, which is exposed by tearing away a perforated panel on the box.

The main advantage of BiB packaging is that it prevents oxidation of the wine during dispensing. Rather than working as a conventional tap, the bladder uses gravity pressure to squeeze the liquid out of the bladder, whereas a conventional barrel tap works by allowing incoming air to displace the contents. After opening wine in a bottle, it is oxidized by air in the bottle which has displaced the wine poured; wine in a bag is not touched by air and thus not subject to oxidation until it is dispensed. Cask wine is not subject to cork taint or spoilage due to slow consumption after opening.

== Aseptic packaging ==
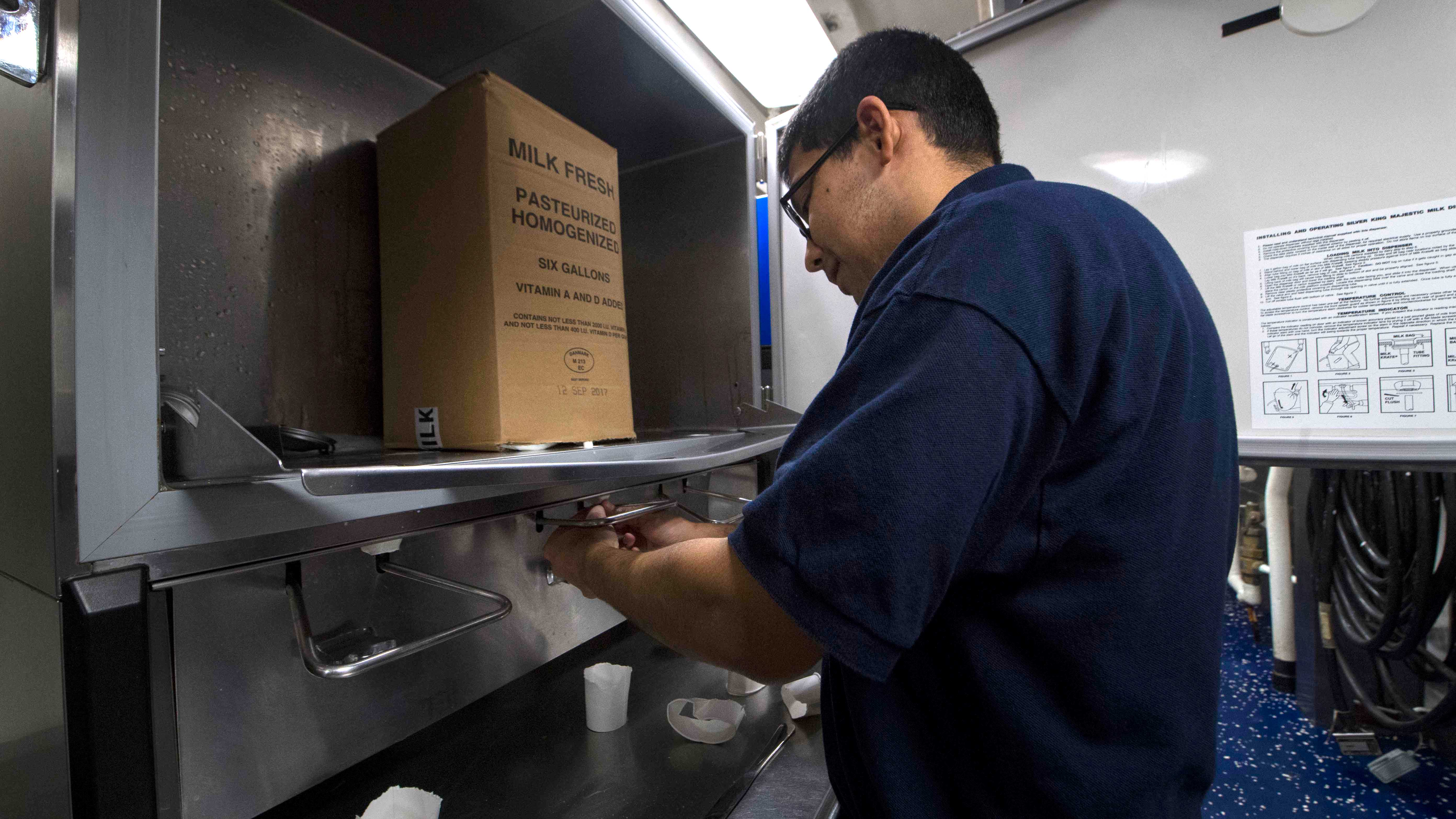
Box of milk being placed in dispenser

BiB is also used extensively in the packaging of processed fruit and dairy products in aseptic processes. Using aseptic packaging equipment, products can be packed in aseptic packaging. Pasteurized or UHT treated products packed into this format can be "shelf-stable", requiring no refrigeration. Some products can have a shelf life of up to 2 years, depending on the type of bag that is used.

The key to this unique system is that the product being filled is not exposed to the external environment at any stage during the process and as such, there is no possibility of a bacterial load being added to the product during the filling process. To ensure there is no contamination from the packaging, the bag is irradiated after the bag manufacturing process.

These packs are typically from 10 to 1200 liters and offer the advantage of cheap, disposable and transport efficient packaging.

== See also ==
- Corrugated box design
- Tetra Brik
