= Joseph Murdock =

Joseph Murdock or Murdoch may refer to:

- Joseph B. Murdock (1851–1931), United States Navy rear admiral
- Joseph R. Murdock (1858–1931), American politician from Utah
- Joseph S. Murdock (1822–1899), American colonizer, leader, and Mormon hymn writer
- Joseph S.F. Murdoch, American golf bibliographer, author, and collector
- Joseph Murdoch (mineralogist) (1890–1973), American, see Murdochite

== See also ==
- Joe Murdoch (1908–2002), Australian rules footballer
