= Andrew Murdoch =

Andrew Murdoch may refer to:

- Andrew Murdoch (sailor), New Zealand sailor
- Andy Murdoch (footballer, born 1968), Scottish footballer (Partick Thistle)
- Andy Murdoch (footballer, born 1995), Scottish footballer (Rangers FC)
- Andrew Murdoch (civil servant), governor of Bermuda
- Andrew Murdoch (engineer) (born 1978), British Formula One and motorsport engineer
