= Trevor Angove =

English cricketer

Personal information
- Born: 15 January 1959 (age 67); Troon, Cornwall, England
- Batting: Right-handed

Domestic team information
- Years: Team
- 1986: Cornwall

Career statistics
Competition	List A
Matches	1
Runs scored	13
Batting average	13
100s/50s	0/0
Top score	13
Catches/stumpings	0/–
- Source: CricketArchive, 14 August 2008

Trevor Angove (born 15 January 1959) is a former English List A cricketer who played his only List A game for Cornwall Cricket Club, in which he scored 13 and did not bowl.

He also played 71 Minor Counties Championship games and 3 Minor counties trophy games for Cornwall.
