= Damien Angove =

Australian rules footballer

Personal information
- Full name: Damien John Angove
- Born: 18 December 1970 (age 55)
- Original team: Old Paradians
- Height: 184 cm (6 ft 0 in)
- Weight: 86 kg (190 lb)

Playing career^{1}
Years	Club	Games (Goals)
1992	Sydney Swans	4 (0)
1993–1996	Port Adelaide (SANFL)	51 (28)
- ^{1} Playing statistics correct to the end of 1996.

Damien Angove (born 18 December 1970) is a former Australian rules footballer who played with the Sydney Swans in the Australian Football League (AFL).

Angove was recruited from Old Paradians and played four senior AFL games for Sydney, all in the second half of the 1992 season.

Angove played in the SANFL with Port Adelaide after leaving Sydney. He played 51 senior games with Port Adelaide from 1993 to 1996. In 1997 he played for Port District Football Club in the SAAFL before being appointed coach in 1998. Angove was a playing coach for 3 years which included a premiership in his 1st year.
