= Thomas Murdoch (merchant) =

Scottish merchant

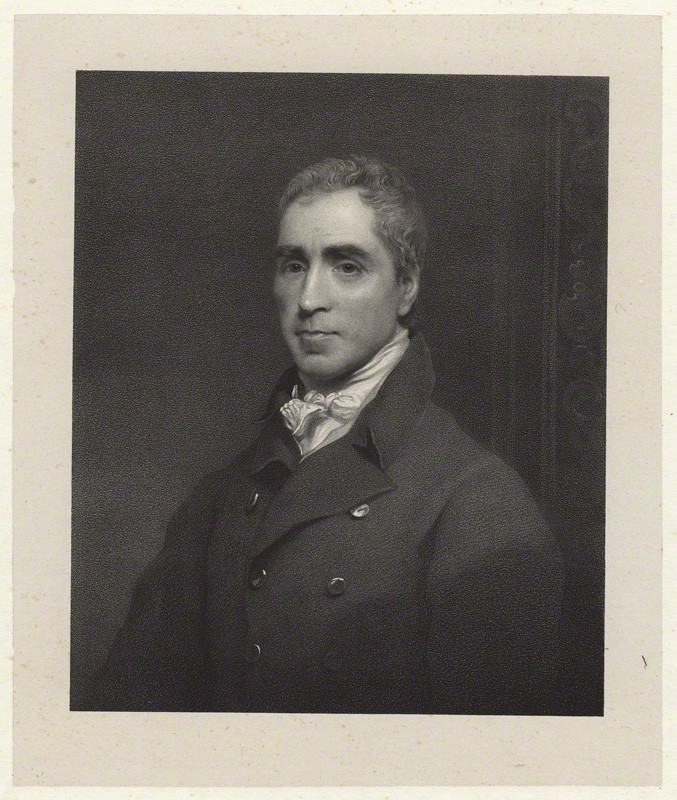
Thomas Murdoch, lithograph about 1816

Thomas Murdoch of Cumloden (1758–1846) was a Scottish merchant in Madeira. He was elected a Fellow of the Royal Society in 1805.

Murdoch was a son of Patrick Murdoch, who emigrated with his other sons to the United States of America. He became a partner in a firm of merchants in Madeira, returning to the United Kingdom in 1803. The civil servant Clinton Murdoch was his son.
