= Clinton Murdoch =

Sir Thomas William Clinton Murdoch
- Born: March 22, 1809; London
- Died: 30 November 1891 (aged 82); 88 St. George's Square, London
- Education: Charterhouse School
- Occupations: Civil servant, Chief Secretary, Provincial Secretary for Lower Canada.
- Spouse: Isabella Anne (married 1836–1891)
- Children: C. S. Murdoch
- Parent: Thomas Murdoch Charlotte Murdoch

Sir Thomas William Clinton Murdoch (1809–1891) was a clerk and civil servant in London and Canada respectively. He was the first Secretary to the Governor General of Canada, Governor General of British North America (which became Governor General of Canada), and later was appointed chairman of the Colonial Land and Emigration Commission.

Murdoch was the son of Thomas Murdoch (merchant), who was a merchant in Madeira.

== Early Life & London Life ==
Murdoch was born on 22 March 1809 in London to Thomas and Charlotte Murdoch. He enrolled in Charterhouse School.

In 1826, he entered the Colonial Office as a junior clerk, and married Isabella Anne in 1836, daughter of Robert Lukin, an official in the War Office.

== Clerk & Civil Servant ==
In September 1839, Murdoch left London to Canada under Sir George Arthur to act as chief secretary for Lord Sydenham, and acting during part of 1841 as provincial secretary for Lower Canada. He returned to the Colonial Office in September 1842, and became a senior clerk there four years later.

In November 1847, Murdoch was appointed the chairman of the Colonial Land and Emigration Commissioners, which is where, in connection with the regulation of emigration and colonisation during the succeeding years, his name is best known; he succeeded Thomas Frederick Elliot. By the 1850s however, assisted emigration was in decline as the Australian colonies gained responsible self-government, meaning that the work of his office became limited to the Passengers Act 1852 enforcements and collecting colonial statistics.

In 1870, he was sent on a diplomatic mission to Canada in connection with the Red River Rebellion, then to the US to discuss the regulation of emigration.

Jobs as a clerk
Job Title	Predecessor	Successor	Years
Assistant Junior Clerk	Vane Jadis (1827–1829)	William Dealtry (1838–1840)	1828 - 1836
Assistant Clerk	Arthur Johnstone Blackwood (1829–1840)	Sir George Barrow (1836–1843)	1836 - 1839
Junior Clerk	Vane Jadis (1829–1846)	William Frederich Higgins (1843–1857)	1839 - 1846
Senior Clerk	Sir George Barrow (1843–1870)	William Robinson (1846–1847)	1846 - 1847

Jobs as civil servant in Canada
Job Title	Predecessor	Successor	Years
Commissioner to the Colonial Land and Emigration Commission	Frederic Rogers, 1st Baron Blachford (1846–1860)	Stephen Wallcot (1860–1878)	1847 - 1876
Secretary to the Governor General of Canada	Position Created	Sir Rawson William (1842–1844)	1841 - 1842

== Later Life & Death ==
Murdoch was created a Order of St Michael and St George in 1870; he retired on Pension in December 1876. He read a great amount, spending his later years among his books. He died on 30 November 1891, at 88 St. George's Square, in London.
