= Andrew Murdoch (engineer) =

British Formula One engineer

- Born: 4 April 1978 (age 48); Northern Ireland
- Occupation: Engineer
- Employer: Williams Racing
- Known for: Formula One engineer
- Title: Senior Performance Engineer

Andrew Murdoch (born 4 April 1978) is a British Formula One and motorsport engineer. He is currently the senior performance engineer for the Williams Racing Formula One team.

== Career ==
Murdoch competed in quad bike racing as a teenager and developed an early suspension project during his A-Level studies. He subsequently studied mechanical engineering at Queen’s University Belfast, graduating in 2000, before completing a master's degree in automotive engineering at Cranfield University in 2001. Following graduation, he began his professional motorsport career with Lola Cars, working in research and development on the company’s Champ Car programme.

He joined Williams Racing in September 2006 as a data and test engineer, supporting the team’s development and trackside analysis activities. In mid-2008 he moved into the race team as a performance engineer to Kazuki Nakajima, continuing in that role through the 2009 season. In 2010 he worked with rookie Nico Hülkenberg, before becoming performance engineer to Pastor Maldonado for the 2011 and 2012 seasons, contributing to the Venezuelan’s maiden and only Grand Prix victory at the 2012 Spanish Grand Prix. Murdoch was promoted to Maldonado’s race engineer for 2013, and in 2014 became Race Engineer to Felipe Massa, guiding the Brazilian to several podium finishes.

From 2015, Murdoch served as a Senior Performance Engineer at Williams, working closely with Valtteri Bottas during the 2015 and 2016 seasons, before supporting Massa again in 2017 and Sergey Sirotkin in 2018. His role focused on performance analysis, car setup direction, and operational support across race weekends, acting as a key link between factory-based engineering groups and the trackside team.
