= Joseph S.F. Murdoch =

American golf bibliographer and author

Joseph S.F. Murdoch (1920 – March 25, 2001) was an American golf bibliographer, author, and collector. He was a co-founder of the Golf Collectors Society (now the Golf Heritage Society) and a life member of the British Golf Collectors Society. His work in cataloging golf literature, particularly The Library of Golf (1968) and The Game of Golf and the Printed Word, 1566-1985 (1987), remains foundational in the field.

== Early life and education ==
Murdoch was born in Philadelphia in 1920 and graduated from Germantown High School in 1938. He served as a U.S. Army master sergeant during World War II before attending the Charles Morris Price School of Advertising and Journalism, where he graduated in 1947.

== Career ==
Murdoch worked as a copy editor for The Philadelphia Inquirer from 1947 to 1951. He later joined Sun Oil Company (Sunoco), serving as an advertising manager and eventually as an industrial-products supervisor until his retirement in 1981.

His primary avocation was golf literature. His 1968 bibliography, The Library of Golf, became an essential reference for collectors, and his 1987 collaboration with Richard E. Donovan, The Game of Golf and the Printed Word, 1566-1985, further solidified his reputation as a leading golf bibliographer. This second bibliography includes an introductory essay by Herbert Warren Wind, one of the most influential golf writers of the 20th century. Wind, known for his lyrical style and deep historical knowledge, helped shape modern golf journalism and coined the term "Amen Corner" for Augusta National. It has been described as "superb golf reference book, illustrated with some pictures."

Murdoch served on the U.S. Golf Association’s museum and library committees, contributing to the preservation of golf’s literary history. His meticulous approach to cataloging golf books and his deep knowledge of the sport's history earned him widespread respect in golf scholarship circles.

== Golf and club affiliations ==
He grew up in Germantown (a neighborhood in Philadelphia, PA) and played golf in Oreland (a township in Montgomery County, PA). As an adolescent, Murdoch played at Sandy Run Country Club, originally chartered in 1923 as Edge Hill Golf Club. His father, A.J. Murdoch, was one of the club’s founding members, signing its charter (certificate of incorporation) as a member of the original board of governors.

J. Franklin Meehan, co-owner of a nursery in Germantown and son of the noted botanist Thomas Meehan, designed the club’s original 18-hole course, which was noted for its naturalistic layout over rolling terrain. In 1927, the club adopted its current name, Sandy Run Country Club, after the stream that runs through the property and influences the par-5 8th hole. Sandy Run (Wissahickon Creek tributary) leads to the Wissahickon Creek.

As an adult, Murdoch became a member of the Philadelphia Cricket Club, designed by A.W. Tillinghast. The Wissahickon Creek meanders along the course. Tillinghast was a member and his ashes were scattered along the Wissahickon Creek at the 18th hole. The Wissahickon course has since been restored to Tillinghast’s original vision, with tree removal and the restoration of greens and bunkers, including the famed “Great Hazard” that must be carried on the par-5 7th hole. The club’s Tillinghast-designed course was renamed "Wissahickon" in the 21st century to distinguish it from the club’s other two courses.

He was also a member of the St. Andrews Society.

== Personal life and death ==
Murdoch resided in Lafayette Hill, Pennsylvania, for over 50 years before moving to Cathedral Village in Philadelphia. He was married to Elizabeth Gale Murdoch for 53 years and had two children, Alexander and Loraine Maguire.

He died on March 25, 2001, at the age of 81 after suffering a heart attack. A memorial service was held at Chestnut Hill Presbyterian Church.

== Selected works ==
- The Library of Golf (1968)
- The Game of Golf and the Printed Word, 1566-1985 (with Richard E. Donovan, 1987)
