= Murdoch (disambiguation) =

Murdoch is both a given name and a surname.

Murdoch may also refer to:

- Murdoch, Western Australia, a suburb of Perth, Australia
- Electoral district of Murdoch, Australia
- Murdoch University, Australia
- Murdoch, Ohio, United States
- 9138 Murdoch, a main-belt asteroid
