= James Murdoch (disambiguation) =

James Murdoch (born 1972) is a British-American businessman.

James Murdoch may also refer to:

- James Murdoch (architect) (1844–1914), American architect in Denver, Colorado
- James Murdoch (music advocate) (1930–2010), Australian arts administrator, musicologist, composer, journalist, broadcaster
- James Murdoch (New South Wales politician) (1867–1939), Australian politician
- James Murdoch (Scottish Orientalist) (1856–1921), Scottish Orientalist scholar and journalist
- James Murdoch (singer) (fl. 2000s), Canadian rock musician and producer
- James Murdoch Jr. (1886–1935), Australian politician
- James Murdoch Sr. (1851–1925), Australian politician
- James Edward Murdoch (1811–1893), American actor and elocutionist

== See also ==
- James Murdock (disambiguation)
