= Murdock (footballer) =

Portuguese footballer (born 1977)

Personal information
- Full name: Paulo Sérgio Macedo Dias
- Date of birth: 19 February 1977 (age 49)
- Place of birth: Ramalde, Porto, Portugal
- Height: 1.80 m (5 ft 11 in)
- Position: Midfielder

Youth career
- 1987–1990: Francos
- 1990–1992: Senhora da Hora
- 1992–1993: Boavista
- 1993–1995: Varzim

Senior career*
| Years | Team | Apps | (Gls) |
| 1995–2000 | Varzim | 23 | (0) |
| 2000 | Vianense | 12 | (0) |
| 2000–2001 | Ribeirão | | |
| 2001–2004 | Tirsense | | |
| 2004–2005 | Leça | | |
| 2005 | Vilanovense | | |
| 2005-2006 | Joane | | |
| 2006-2007 | Vilanovense | | |
| 2007-2008 | Maia | | |
| 2008-2009 | Vilanovense | | |
| 2009-2010 | Maia Lidador | | |
| 2011-2012 | Candal | 14 | (1) |
| 2012-2013 | Maia Lidador | | |
| 2013-2014 | Candal | | |
| Total | | 49 | (1) |
- * Club domestic league appearances and goals

Paulo Sérgio Macedo Dias (born 19 February 1977), known as Murdock, is a Portuguese former professional footballer who played as a midfielder.
