= James Murdock =

James Murdock may refer to:

- James Murdock (scholar) (1776–1856), American scholar
- James Murdock (politician) (1871–1949), Canadian politician
- James Murdock (actor) (1931–1981), American actor

== See also ==
- James Murdoch (disambiguation)
