= Cornwall Cricket Club =

Cricket club in Auckland, New Zealand

Coordinates: 36.8948°S 174.7822°E

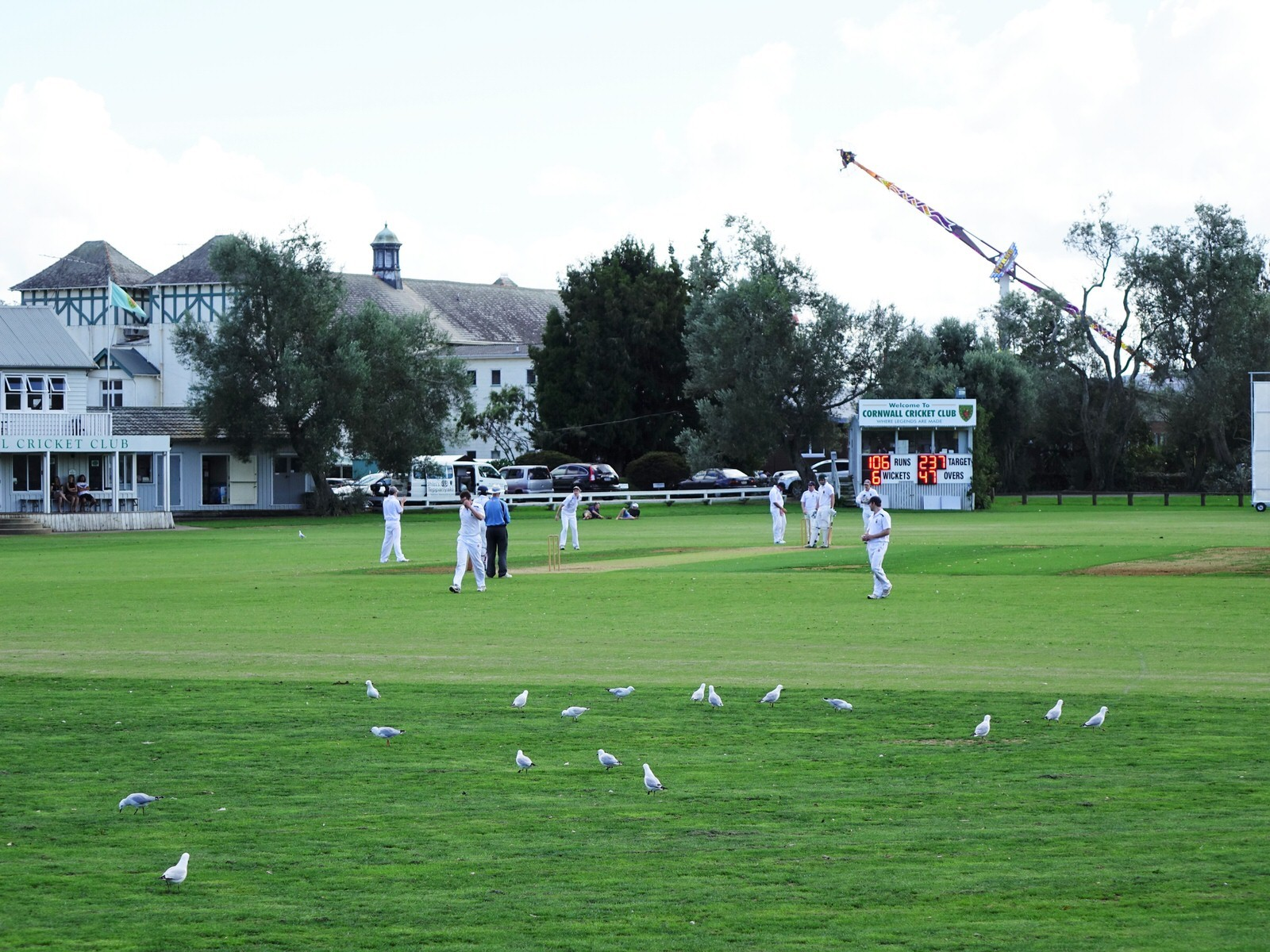
- Interactive map of Cornwall Cricket Club

Ground information
- Location: 210 Green Lane West, Epsom. Cornwall Park, Auckland, New Zealand
- Country: New Zealand
- Establishment: 1895; 131 years ago as Ponsonby Cricket Club

International information
- First women's Test: 28 March–1 April 1969: New Zealand v England
- Last women's Test: 11–15 January 1992: New Zealand v England
- First WODI: 10 January 1982: New Zealand v England
- Last WODI: 14 January 1982: New Zealand v India
- As of 24 November 2009; Source: CricketArchive

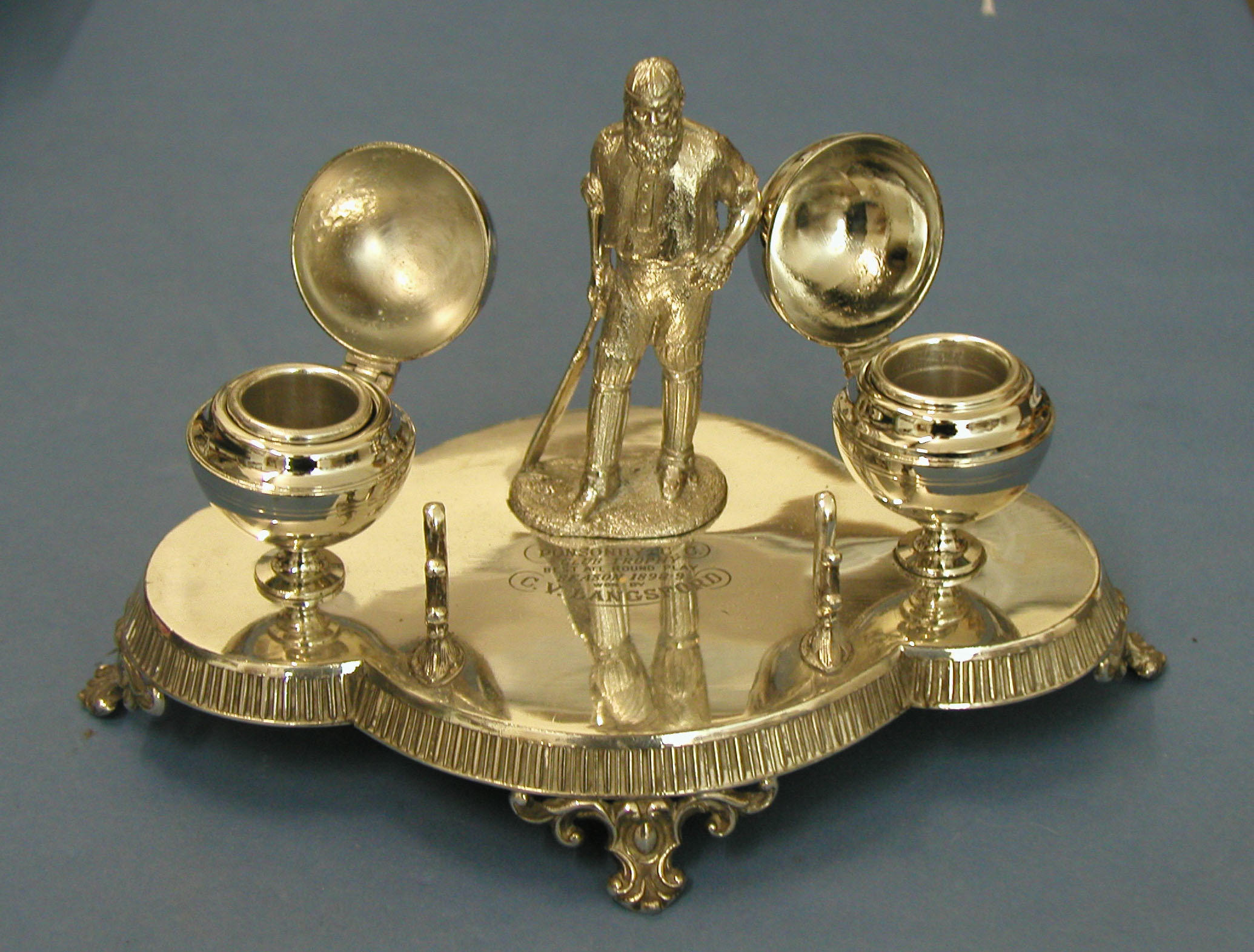
Club trophy, best all round play 1898–99

The Cornwall Cricket Club, known formally as the Cornwall Districts Cricket and Sports Association Incorporated, is a cricket club which was founded in 1895 in Auckland, New Zealand, as Ponsonby Cricket Club. It claims the largest membership of any cricket club in New Zealand.

The club's cricket ground is in Cornwall Park opposite the showgrounds at 210 Green Lane West, Epsom where it has been since 1952. Cornwall comes from the park's name given by the Duke of Cornwall later George V when visiting Auckland in 1901.

The first recorded match on the ground was in 1958, when England women played a New Zealand women's touring team. The ground has also hosted three Women's Test matches and three Women's ODIs at the 1982 Women's Cricket World Cup.

Max Cricket, invented by Martin Crowe, was launched here in 1996. The first match was televised on Sky and watched by a crowd of 8,000. The club twice held a Guinness World Record for the longest cricket marathon - 55 hours in 2008 followed up by playing for 100 hours non stop in 2010.

Notable players include Dave Crowe, Jeff Crowe, Martin Crowe, Ian Gould, Adrian Dale, Paul Collingwood, Rob Nicol, Peter Webb, Adam Parore, Mark Greatbatch, Rodney Redmond and Graham Vivian.

Club officers include businessman Roger Kerr.
