= William Murdoch (poet) =

Canadian poet

William Murdoch (24 February 1823 – 4 May 1887) was a Scottish-Canadian poet.

Born in Paisley, Renfrewshire, Scotland, Murdoch migrated to Canada in 1854, aged 31. The following year, he was appointed manager of the gasworks on Partridge Island in Saint John, New Brunswick. He contributed to the Saint John Morning News from 1865, and published Poems and Songs (1860) and Discursory Ruminations: A Fireside Drama (1876).

Murdoch died in Saint John, New Brunswick, Canada.

== Style ==
He wrote in the Lowland Scots dialogue made popular by Robert Burns. The Literary History of Canada describes Murdoch's poems as having "style and polish" and it cites the following stanza as representative:

God pity then the poor blue noses
Their cheeks like flour, their nebs like roses;
They puff, they grue, and swallow doses

To heat their wame

Till aft when night their business closes

They hiccup hame.

– from Poems and Songs
