= David Murdoch (banker) =

New Zealand banker and company director

David Limond Murdoch (2 November 1825 – 5 June 1911) was a notable New Zealand banker and company director. He was born in Ayr, Ayrshire, Scotland, on 2 November 1825.

David Murdoch died at his residence on 5 June 1911.
